= Haverly =

Haverly may refer to:

== People ==
- J. H. Haverly (1837–1901), American theatre manager and promoter of blackface minstrel shows
- Jeffrey Haverly (born 1958), American politician from South Dakota
- Terri Haverly (born 1957), American politician from South Dakota

== Other ==
- Haverly v. United States (1975), tax evasion case decided by the U.S. Court of Appeals for the Seventh Circuit
