= 1990 ARCO explosion =

1990 explosion in Channelview, Texas, US

Arco Chemical Channelview, Texas explosion
- Date: July 5, 1990
- Time: 11:21 p.m. CDT
- Location: 2502 Sheldon Road Channelview, Texas, United States; 29°49′5″N 95°7′20″W
- Type: Explosion
- Cause: Build-up of oxygen and hydrocarbon vapors in wastewater tank
- Deaths: 17
- Injuries: 5

An explosion at the ARCO Chemical (ACC) Channelview, Texas petrochemical plant killed 17 people and injured five others on July 5, 1990. It was one of the deadliest industrial disasters in the history of the Greater Houston area.

The land along the Houston Ship Channel is a heavily industrialized area, with numerous oil refineries. In the late 1980s and early 1990s, several large industrial disasters occurred in the area, with the largest being the Phillips disaster of 1989, a refinery explosion that resulted in 23 deaths and over 100 injuries. In the community of Channelview, ACC operated a petrochemical plant that was the world's largest producer of the fuel additive methyl tert-butyl ether. On July 5, 1990, employees at the plant were working on restarting a compressor for a 900,000 US gal (3.4 ML) wastewater storage tank at the facility. The tank held wastewater that contained hydrocarbons until it could be deposited in a disposal well. Because the hydrocarbons in the tank could vaporize, the tank had an oxygen analyzer that kept track of the oxygen concentration in the tank and had a nitrogen sweep system to keep the gas inert. However, unbeknownst to the employees, the oxygen analyzer had malfunctioned and as a result, the oxygen level in the tank was at a dangerous level. While restarting the compressor, the gas ignited and caused a large explosion. The explosion completely destroyed the tank and some of the surrounding facility infrastructure, affecting an area the size of a city block.

Following the accident, the Occupational Safety and Health Administration (OSHA) fined ACC about $3.48 million for over 300 violations of the Occupational Safety and Health Act, the largest OSHA fine at the time. Additionally, the company agreed to safety changes at its other three plants in the United States. Damages were estimated to total $100 million; however, ACC spent only $36 million in repairs and upgrades at the Channelview plant including $20 million on safety redundancies.

== Background ==
=== Previous industrial accidents in the area ===
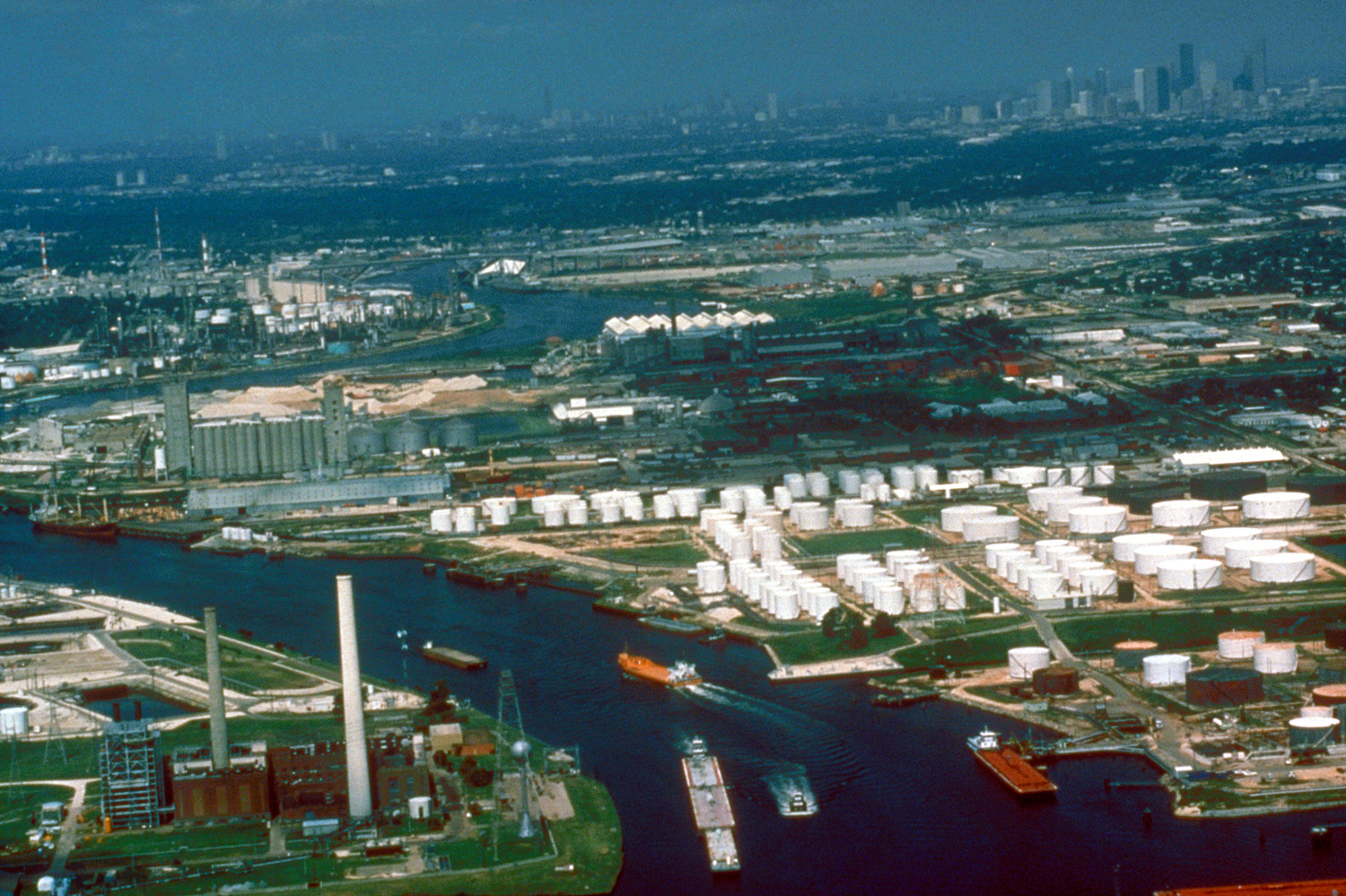
Houston Ship Channel, with downtown Houston in the upper right corner

The Houston Ship Channel is a roughly 50-mile (80 km) long waterway that links the Texas city of Houston to Galveston Bay and, ultimately, the Gulf of Mexico. The channel makes up part of the port of Houston, which in 1990 was the third-largest port in the United States. The land on either side of the channel is a heavily industrialized area, with approximately 150 industries in operation there in 1990, including numerous oil refineries. A 1990 article in the Los Angeles Times referred to the area as having "the largest complex of petrochemical plants in the nation", and during the late 1980s and early 1990s, there were several large-scale explosions or disasters at these plants. In October 1989, a refinery in Pasadena, Texas, that was operated by the Phillips Petroleum Company exploded in a disaster that killed 23 people and injured over 100, and two more explosions the following year at different refineries injured a further seven people. These incidents prompted an April 1990 report from Secretary of Labor Elizabeth Dole to President George H. W. Bush that called on the petrochemical industry to develop stronger safety plans to prevent future accidents.

=== Arco Chemical Channelview plant ===
In the Ship Channel community of Channelview, Texas, located several miles east of downtown Houston, (Note: Sources differ slightly on the distance, with given distances of 15 miles (24 km), 16 miles (26 km), and 20 miles (32 km).) chemical and plastics company ACC operated a large petrochemical plant. (Note: Arco Chemical was a subsidiary of parent company ARCO, with ARCO having about an 80 percent stake in the company at the time.) The 564-acre (228 ha) plant had been in operation since 1977 and had been acquired by ARCO in 1980. The plant primarily produced petroleum additives and in 1990 was the largest producer of the fuel additive methyl tert-butyl ether (MTBE) in the world, producing between 25,000 US bbl (3 ML) and 30,000 US bbl (3.6 ML) daily. (Note: A 1990 article in The New York Times gives a slightly more accurate daily production value of approximately 27,500 US bbl (3.28 million L).) This resulted in an annual production of approximately 1.7 billion lb (770,000 t) of MTBE, equivalent to approximately 25 percent of the United States's total MTBE production. Additionally, the plant annually produced about 560 million lb (250,000 t) of propylene oxide and 1.3 billion lb (590,000 t) of styrene monomer. (Note: These two values are given in 1990 articles of AP News and the Houston Chronicle. However, a 1990 article in The New York Times gives slightly different values of 600 million lb (270 million kg) of propylene oxide and 1.4 billion lb (640 million kg) of styrene monomer.) The plant around this time employed about 350 ACC employees, (Note: Several sources state that the plant employed 350 ARCO employees, while a 1990 article in the Houston Chronicle gave the number as about 400.) in addition to about 150 contractors from Austin Industrial, Inc., a Houston-based contracting firm, and had a total annual payroll of about $20 million. From taking over the plant in 1980 until 1990, ARCO had been cited twice by the Occupational Safety and Health Administration (OSHA) for minor violations of the Occupational Safety and Health Act.

On the northwestern edge of the plant, in a remote utility area, was a 900,000 US gal (3.4 ML) storage tank, measuring about 40 feet (12 m) tall and 62 feet (19 m) in diameter, that temporarily stored wastewater from the plant's propylene oxide and styrene monomer operations. After treatment, this liquid was transferred to an on-site disposal well. The wastewater, which was held in the tank at atmospheric pressure, usually contained some hydrocarbon liquids that would result in hydrocarbon vapor and oxygen building up in the vapor space of the tank. To prevent these vapor levels from reaching dangerous levels, the tank had an oxygen analyzer that provided a continuous readout of the oxygen level in the tank, and excessive oxygen and hydrocarbon vapor could be purged through a nitrogen sweep system. A compressor would move this vapor to a pressurized tank where it would be scrubbed before being vented to the atmosphere. Throughout early 1990, this compressor required additional maintenance, and it had been out of service for 41 percent of the year. In late June 1990, this compressor stopped working, and ARCO removed the piece of equipment and began venting the vapor from the tank to the open atmosphere, which had been the standard method of vapor disposal practiced at the plant before scrubbing was introduced as part of an environmental upgrade to the facility. On July 4, the nitrogen sweeping system was turned off to allow workers to modify some piping and instrumentation, as well as general cleaning of the tank, before restarting the compressor. The system had been turned off only after the oxygen analyzer showed safe levels of oxygen within the tank. The following day, July 5, the compressor was to be restarted. At the time, there were several dozen people working the night shift at the facility, (Note: Sources vary on the exact number, with a 1990 article in the Houston Chronicle stating that 50 people were working at the time, while a 1990 article in The New York Times gives a number of 65 workers.) with five working in the immediate area of the tank. However, the number of people in the area was larger than usual due to the cleaning of the tanks.

== Explosion ==
At 11:21 p.m. CDT, (Note: Sources vary on the exact time of the explosion. The time given here is the one given in a report published by the United States Department of Labor. The New York Times and the Associated Press both state that the explosion occurred around 11:30 p.m. However, the Houston Chronicle and the United Press International both give an exact time of 11:20 p.m. Meanwhile the Oil & Gas Journal states that it occurred "just before midnight".) an explosion occurred when the compressor for the wastewater tank was being restarted. The explosion resulted in a large flame that rose at least 100 feet (30 m) over the Houston Ship Channel, (Note: One source states the flame rose 200 feet (61 m).) resulting in large plumes of black smoke. The blast was felt by people as far as 8 miles (13 km) away, and windows in some nearby homes were reportedly broken from the pressure wave. At the facility, an area of roughly one city block was severely damaged by the explosion. The wastewater storage tank was completely destroyed, with an article in the Los Angeles Times describing it as having been "flattened like a soft drink can crushed in a vise". The explosion within the tank had been so powerful that the 48,000-pound (22 t) lid of the tank had been blown off and landed in a parking lot about 200 yards (180 m) away. Additionally, another nearby 15,000-US-gallon (57 kL) tank was blown 200 feet (60 m) into a pipe rack. Along with the two tanks and the main pipe rack, the explosion also seriously damaged a cogeneration facility and two cooling towers. However, the blast did not affect the MTBE facilities at the plant.

== Emergency response ==
In the immediate aftermath, authorities described the incident as relatively minor, with no reports of any injuries. Shortly after the blast, the facility's fire brigade began putting out the fires that had resulted from the explosion. They would be the main firefighting force that handled the fires, although additional help would be provided by the hazardous materials units from the Channel Industries Mutual Aid, Merichem, and the Shell Oil Refinery. Most of the fires had been put out by 4 a.m. the next morning, with smaller fires completely put out by 5 a.m. According to company officials, the explosion did not result in any leakage of hazardous materials, and no area evacuation was issued, although traffic was rerouted away from the facility. After the fires were put out, the plant's main operations were shut down, including the MTBE operations. The plant was expected to be shut down for several months as it underwent repairs. The shutdown affected approximately 15 percent of the total production of styrene in the United States.

Members of the Harris County fire marshal's and medical examiner's offices arrived on the scene following the explosion. While initial reports from company authorities had stated that there had been no injuries, there had in fact been several injuries and multiple deaths from the disaster. The fire marshal's office assisted in body recovery, and by 11 a.m. the next morning, 14 bodies had been found, with two people believed to have been in the plant at the time unaccounted for. Through the day, this number would rise to 15 dead and one unaccounted for. By July 6, the final count had 17 people killed and five injured. Of the dead, five were Arco Chemical employees and eleven were Austin Industrial employees. Additionally, a truck driver was found dead in the cabin of his vacuum truck. He was an employee for Waste Processing, Inc., which had been contracted to help with maintenance work. Some of the injured were hospitalized at the nearby San Jacinto Methodist Hospital in Baytown, Texas. Speaking about the size of the tragedy, ACC Americas President Jack Johnson said, "In my 32 years I can't remember a single incident of this magnitude where we had multiple loss of life".

== Aftermath ==
=== Investigation and cause of the explosion ===
On the morning of July 6, Gerard F. Scannell, an Assistant Secretary in the United States Department of Labor and head of OSHA, arrived at the scene, saying he would ensure "that all necessary resources of the Labor Department and OSHA are made available for a complete and timely investigation of this workplace tragedy". Specifically, Scannell stated that OSHA would be reviewing work orders and interviewing people from the plant to determine if the maintenance work that was being conducted at the wastewater storage tank had contributed to the explosion. At the time, authorities were not completely sure if the compressor had caused the explosion. OSHA concluded their initial review of the site within a week. By January 1991, according to an article in the Oil & Gas Journal, investigators were "95% sure" regarding the cause and timeline of events regarding the explosion. According to OSHA investigators, the oxygen analyzer in the wastewater tank had malfunctioned on June 15, 1990, resulting in a reduction in the nitrogen purging and a steady buildup of oxygen in the tank that reached dangerous levels. This was further intensified during the maintenance work performed on July 4 and 5, when the nitrogen system was temporarily shut down. As a result, energy from some normal operation around the tank (such as the compressor restarting) provided enough energy to ignite the vapor and cause the explosion.

=== Use of contracted employees ===
Several contemporary sources also noted the use of contracted labor in discussions of the explosion. In a 1990 article of The New York Times, journalist Roberto Suro noted that in the April 1990 report that Labor Secretary Dole had submitted concerning petrochemical plant accidents there were, among other things, recommendations that contracted employees at these facilities be given special safety training. The Los Angeles Times similarly cited a report by the John Gray Institute of Lamar University in Beaumont, Texas, that stated that contract workers received less safety training and were less knowledgeable of workplace hazards than their company employee counterparts. According to the report, due to economic and time constraints, "safety was frequently cited as a secondary consideration among short-term contractors". The subject was also a point of discussion in a July 23, 1990, hearing before the United States House Committee on Government Operations on chemical accidents, Representative Tom Lantos stated that, as with some previous incidents, "the contract work force again figures prominently", noting that while 75 percent of the facility's employees were ACC employees, two-thirds of the people killed were contracted workers. The Oil, Chemical and Atomic Workers International Union (OCAW, a labor union representing petrochemical workers) similarly criticized the use of contracted labor at the facility, with Secretary-Treasurer Tony Mazzocchi saying, "There is a direct association between the lack of preventive maintenance, the substitution of contract labor for skilled, permanent union labor and this accident. The contractors were probably working more than 16 hours straight when [the tank] exploded." Similarly, in a July 8 article by United Press International, the wife of one of the contracted workers killed in the explosion said he had been working 16-hour shifts and had worked 86 hours the week before the incident. Some of the contracted workers who were working on the tank had been on the job since 7 a.m. and had been working until the explosion, past the legally-mandated quitting time of 11 p.m. The president of the OCAW local union in Houston made comments similarly linking the explosion to the use of contracted labor. However, a vice president of ARCO dismissed the connection, saying, "The focus on contract workers is unfortunate. It doesn't address the problem." At the time of the accident, approximately half of the petrochemical workers in the United States were non-union contract workers.

=== Legal settlements and changes from the company ===
U.S. and Texas officials opted not to criminally prosecute ACC for the deaths. However, on January 3, 1991, ACC agreed to pay $3,481,300 in fines levied by OSHA for violations of the Occupational Safety and Health Act no later than January 10. OSHA had fined the company $10,000 for each of the 347 "willful" violations (wherein the company intentionally disregarded or was indifferent to the requirements in the Occupational Safety and Health Act) and a further $11,300 for 15 "serious" violations (wherein the company operated while knowing of a serious probability of an accident that could cause injuries or death). At the time, it was the largest monetary settlement in OSHA history. Other terms of the agreement stipulated that ACC would organize a "process hazard analysis staff" for each of its four U.S. facilities (including the Channelview facility) within 30 days, which would then conduct process hazard analyses and report their findings to their respective OSHA regional offices within 270 days. Within 30 days of these reports, the management of each plant would have to provide written statements and would then have no more than one year to implement the changes recommended by these teams. ARCO, in agreeing to the settlement with OSHA, stated that it did not affirm the accuracy of OSHA's investigation and conclusions regarding the conduct and operations at the plant. However, according to Arco Chemical Americas President Johnson, instead of disputing some of OSHA's conclusions, "we decided it served everyone better if we focused on improving safety of our operations". In addition to the OSHA fines, the company faced lawsuits from the families of several of the deceased workers. In total, damages from the explosion were approximately $100 million.

In addition to the fines and mandated changes, ACC agreed to revamp safety measures regarding safety training and management at all four facilities in the United States. Infrastructure-wise, ACC spent $36 million between July 1990 and January 1991 in repairs and upgrades to the wastewater facilities at the Channelview plant. Of that amount, $20 million was spent on adding system safety redundancies. For example, the upgrades resulted in a change in the number of wastewater storage tanks increasing from three to eight, an increase in the number of oxygen analyzers from one to sixteen, and the installation of a backup nitrogen supply system that sweeps the tanks on a continuous basis.

=== Later history ===
In a 2001 book, anthropologist and professor Kim Fortun discussed the explosion and compared the disaster to the Bhopal disaster, citing similarities between the role that maintenance neglect and inexperienced workers played in the two incidents. In 2002, the U.S. Chemical Safety and Hazard Investigation Board (an independent federal agency that investigates industrial accidents) completed a two-year study on serious chemical accidents that occurred between 1980 and 2000, specifically highlighting the 1990 ARCO explosion as one of the worst in that time period. The board convened in September of that year in Houston, in part because the Houston area had been home to large-scale disasters like the one in 1990. Since then, the next biggest industrial disaster to occur in the Greater Houston area was the 2005 Texas City refinery explosion, which killed 15 people and injured 180.

== See also ==
- List of disasters in the United States by death toll
- List of explosions
- List of industrial disasters

== Sources ==
- Axtman, Kris (March 25, 2005). "Texas explosion raises concerns about aging refineries". The Christian Science Monitor. Christian Science Publishing Society. ISSN 0882-7729. Archived from the original on January 25, 2021.
- Brooks, Nancy Rivera (June 19, 1998). "Lyondell to Acquire Arco Chemical". Los Angeles Times.
- "Wife's Suit Against ARCO Thwarts Efforts to Probe Cause of Blast". Deseret News. Deseret News Publishing Company. July 8, 1990. Archived from the original on January 13, 2022.
- Dixon, Jack; Gullo, Louis J.; Raheja, Dev (2018). "Lessons Learned". In Gullo, Louis J.; Dixon, Jack (eds.). Design for Safety. John Wiley & Sons. pp. 381–422. ISBN 978-1-118-97429-2.
- Employment and Housing Subcommittee of the Committee on Government Operations, House of Representatives (1991) [July 23, 1990]. Adequacy of OSHA Protections for Chemical Workers. Part 2 101st United States Congress, Second Session. Washington, D.C.: U.S. Government Printing Office.
- Fortun, Kim (2001). Advocacy After Bhopal: Environmentalism, Disaster, New Global Orders. Chicago: University of Chicago Press. ISBN 978-0-226-25718-1.
- Gonzales, Carolina (July 6, 2015). "25 years later: Looking back at the ARCO explosion in Channelview". Houston Chronicle. Hearst Communications. Archived from the original on January 13, 2022.
- Holcombe, Madeline (March 20, 2019). "Now-extinguished Deer Park blaze joins the list of explosions and fires that have rocked the Houston area". CNN. Archived from the original on January 13, 2022.
- Horswell, Cindy (March 25, 2005) [July 5, 1990]. "ARCO refinery explosion, fire kill 14". Houston Chronicle. Hearst Communications. Archived from the original on August 10, 2021.
- Kennedy, J. Michael (July 7, 1990). "17 Die, 5 Hurt in Blast at Texas Chemical Plant". Los Angeles Times. Archived from the original on January 13, 2022.
- "ARCO to Pay $3.48 Million for Alleged Workplace Violations in July 5 Texas Explosion". Labor Press Service. Washington, D.C.: United States Department of Labor: 1–6. January 14, 1991.
- "Arco may get a special payment from a subsidiary". Los Angeles Times. June 23, 1987.
- Mokhiber, Russell (December 1990). "Corporate Villains: The 10 Worst Corporations of 1990". Multinational Monitor. 11 (12). Archived from the original on July 31, 2020.
- "ARCO Spells Out Cause of Channelview Blast". Oil & Gas Journal. PennWell. January 14, 1991. Archived from the original on January 14, 2022.
- "Explosion Rips Through World's Largest MTBE Unit". Petroleum Supply Monthly. Energy Information Administration: xix. June 1990.
- Rendon, Ruth (July 6, 1990). "Explosion at Chemical Plant Kills 17; Five Injured". AP News. Associated Press.
- Schwartz, Emily (September 1990). "Workers at Risk". Multinational Monitor. 11 (9). Archived from the original on July 31, 2020.
- Suro, Roberto (July 7, 1990). "Explosion Kills 17 at Petrochemical Plant in Texas". The New York Times. p. 8. ISSN 0362-4331. Archived from the original on January 13, 2022.
- "Worker expressed fear of plant explosion". United Press International. July 8, 1990. Archived from the original on January 13, 2022.
- "Two-Year Staff Investigation Points to Gaps in OSHA and Industry Standards for Reactive Chemicals". U.S. Chemical Safety and Hazard Investigation Board. September 17, 2002. Archived from the original on January 13, 2022.
