= Phillips disasters =

Phillips disasters may refer to:

- 1989 Phillips disaster, a series of explosions and fire on October 23, 1989, in Pasadena, Texas
- 1999 Phillips disaster, an explosion and fire on June 23, 1999, in Pasadena, Texas
- 2000 Phillips disaster, an explosion and fire on March 27, 2000, in Pasadena, Texas
