= Mark Kirkeby =

American politician (born 1960)

Member of the South Dakota Senate from the 35th district
- In office January 8, 2013 – January 13, 2015
- Preceded by: Jeffrey Haverly
- Succeeded by: Terri Haverly

Member of the South Dakota House of Representatives from the 35th district
- In office January 2007 – January 8, 2013 Serving with Jeffrey Haverly (2007–2009); Don Kopp (2009–2013)
- Preceded by: Alice McCoy
- Succeeded by: Blaine Campbell

Personal details
- Born: March 19, 1960 (age 66) Mobridge, South Dakota
- Party: Republican
- Education: Black Hills State University (BA, BS)

Mark K. Kirkeby (born March 19, 1960) is an American politician and a Republican member of the South Dakota Senate representing District 35 from 2013 to 2015. Kirkeby served consecutively in the South Dakota Legislature from January 2007 until January 8, 2013, in the South Dakota House of Representatives District 35 seat.

== Early life and education ==
Kirkeby was born on March 19, 1960 in Mobridge, South Dakota.

He earned his BA in business administration and his BS in political science from Black Hills State University.

== Political career ==
- 2012 When incumbent Senate District 35 Republican Senator Jeffrey Haverly left the Legislature and left the District 35 seat open, Kirkeby was unopposed for both the June 5, 2012, Republican Primary and also the November 6, 2012, general election, winning with 5,382 votes.
- 2000 Kirkeby challenged incumbent House District 35 Republican Representatives Alice McCoy and William Napoli in the three-way June 6, 2000, Republican Primary, but placed third behind them; they went on to win the four-way November 7, 2000, general election where Representative Napoli took the first seat and Representative McCoy took the second seat ahead of Democratic nominees Theresa Spry and Gary Sisco.
- 2006 When House District 35 incumbent Republican Representative McCoy ran for South Dakota Senate and left a District 35 seat open, Kirkeby ran in the four-way June 6, 2006, Republican Primary and placed first with 858 votes (32.9%); in the four-way November 7, 2006, general election incumbent Republican Representative Jeffrey Haverly took the first seat and Kirkeby took the second seat with 3,326 votes (31.6%) ahead of Democratic nominee Laurie Wudtke and Independent candidate John Buxcel.
- 2008 When House District 35 incumbent Republican Representative Haverly ran for South Dakota Senate, Kirkeby ran in the three-way June 3, 2008, Republican Primary and placed first with 735 votes (43.2%), in the four-way November 4, 2008, General election Kirkeby took the first seat with 4,556 votes (33%) and fellow Republican nominee Don Kopp took the second seat ahead of Democratic nominees Fern Johnson and Curtis Marquardt.
- 2010 Kirkeby and Kopp were unopposed for the June 8, 2010, Republican Primary and won the four-way November 2, 2010, general election, where Kirkeby took the first seat with 3,609 votes (35.3%) and Representative Kopp took the second seat ahead of Democratic nominee Sharon Green and Independent candidate Jay Pond.
