= Lynne DiSanto =

American politician

Member of the South Dakota Senate from the 35 district
- In office January 8, 2019 – December 31, 2019
- Preceded by: Terri Haverly
- Succeeded by: Jessica Castleberry

Member of the South Dakota House of Representatives from the 35th district
- In office January 13, 2015 – January 8, 2019
- Preceded by: Don Kopp
- Succeeded by: Tina Mulally

Personal details
- Born: January 25, 1977 (age 49) Sioux Falls, South Dakota, US
- Party: Republican
- Profession: Realtor

Lynne DiSanto, also known as Lyndi Meyers, (born January 25, 1977) is an American politician from Box Elder, South Dakota, a former Republican member of the South Dakota state senate and former member of the South Dakota House of Representatives representing District 35, and the former Republican majority whip in the state House. In 2014 and 2016, she received the highest total of votes in her district, which elected two Republicans to the state House of Representatives, and also was elected as a Donald Trump delegate to the 2016 presidential convention.

On September 5, 2019, Lynne DiSanto legally changed her name to Lyndi DiSanto, separated from her husband Mark DiSanto, resigned from the South Dakota legislature, and moved to Montana. Currently, she is going by the name Lyndi Meyer and has returned to working in real estate under Berkshire Hathaway HomeServices Floberg Real Estate in the Billings, Montana area. She has also been known by the names Lyn DiSanto, Lynne Hix-DiSanto, Lynne Hix and is currently going by the name Lyn Seeks according to her Facebook page

== Political History ==
=== 2018 State Senate election ===
In 2018, DiSanto was elected to the state senate by defeating Democrat Pat Cromwell with 4,323 (62%) votes to 2,650 (38%) votes.

== Controversy ==
#1 On September 7, 2017, DiSanto shared a graphic via a Facebook post showing two stick figures mowed down by a large sport utility vehicle and another fleeing from the attack, accompanied by an "All Lives Splatter" meme, which she described as "a movement we can all support". The graphic added, "Nobody cares about your protest. Keep your ass off the road". The meme was fashioned after the "All Lives Matter" slogan. The post was shared 26 days after 19 protesters were injured and Heather Heyer was murdered in a vehicular attack on August 12, in Charlottesville, Virginia, during a white supremacist "Unite the Right" rally and counter protest there.

After information about DiSanto's post emerged in news media twelve days later, on September 19, she deleted the post and locked her Facebook account. DiSanto subsequently apologized for a lack of judgment:

"I am sorry if people took offense to it and perceived my message in any way insinuating support or condoning people being hit by cars,” DiSanto told The Rapid City Journal. “I perceived it differently. I perceived it as encouraging people to stay out of the street.”

Following the news and heavy criticism of DiSanto's post, Keller Williams Realty Black Hills announced that it had ended its association with DiSanto. The Working Against Violence group announced the cancellation of DiSanto's keynote address at its annual Power of Purple Domestic Violence Awareness event. House Majority Leader Lee Qualm stated that DiSanto's position as House Majority Whip would not be affected by this incident.

#2 DiSanto involved herself with a number of missing persons cases and created a Facebook page called Lyn Seeks Truth. The Facebook page is currently not active, however it was accompanied by a YouTube Channel and a website that retained the spelling Lynne for the title. Lynne faced heavy criticism for her speculations and behavior surrounding the Serenity Dennard case, specifically. DiSanto was served a no-trespass order from the police department after she made threatening comments to a constituent , and she was reprimanded for recording an interview with Serenity's biological mother against the correctional facility's guidelines. Her actions originally resulted in DiSanto being banned from the prison, but this was later reconsidered.

== Personal life ==
DiSanto was born in Sioux Falls, South Dakota.

She attended Chadron State College from 1996-2000 for a BBA in marketing and from 2000-2002 for a MA in counseling psychology.

Prior to her election, she owned a modeling agency/school in Rapid City, South Dakota by the name of "Fierce Modeling". The modeling agency was featured on the reality TV show Remodeled. She also owned Fast-Teks On-Site Computer Services of the Black Hills.
