= CIMA =

CIMA may refer to:

== Acronyms ==
- Canadian Independent Music Association, formerly the Canadian Independent Record Production Association
- Cayman Islands Monetary Authority, Cayman Island's primary financial services regulator
- Center for Intercultural and Multilingual Advocacy, a department in the College of Education at Kansas State University
- Center for International Media Assistance, a media development organization in Washington, DC.
- Centre of International Modern Art, an art museum in Kolkata, India
- Centre International de la Mécanique d'Art (International centre for Art Mechanics), a museum in Switzerland
- Channel Industries Mutual Aid, a Houston emergency response organization
- Chartered Institute of Management Accountants, a UK-based global professional body
- Chenille International Manufacturers Association
- Costruzione Italiana Macchine Attrezzi (Italian Machine Tool Company), the gear and transmission manufacturing subsidiary of Coesia
- CIMA, the Microlight and Paramotor Commission of the Fédération Aéronautique Internationale

== People ==
- Cima, stage name of Japanese professional wrestler Nobuhiko Oshima (born 1977)

== Other uses ==
- CIMA: The Enemy, console role-playing game
- CIMA (AM), a defunct radio station in Vancouver, British Columbia, Canada
- Hospital CIMA in San José, Costa Rica
- (R)-citramalate synthase, an enzyme
