= Abortion in South Dakota =

Abortion in South Dakota is illegal. Anyone who induces an abortion is guilty of a Class 6 felony. An exception is included to "preserve the life of the pregnant female," given appropriate and reasonable medical judgment.

There were 878 legal abortions in 2000, 895 in 2001, 819 in 2003, 551 in 2014, and 444 in 2015.

In November 2024, South Dakotans voted on Amendment G, which, if passed, would have amended the state constitution to create a right to abortion in the first two trimesters of pregnancy. The amendment failed by a 41–59% margin.

== History ==
=== Legislative history ===
By 1950, the state legislature had passed a law stating that a woman who had an abortion or actively sought to have an abortion, regardless of whether she went through with it, was guilty of a criminal offense. Some states require that a person seeking an abortion must wait for a period of one to six days, depending on the state, after visiting the provider for the first time and before having the procedure. South Dakota requires that the patient obtain mandatory counseling from an anti-abortion crisis pregnancy center during this time frame.

In 2004, a bill outlawing abortion passed both houses of the legislature, but was vetoed by the Governor due to a technicality. The state's legislature subsequently passed five laws curtailing the legality of abortion in 2005, including House Bill 1249 The majority of a legislative "task force" then issued a report recommending that the legislature illegalize all abortions, which would lead to a challenge of the constitutionality of Roe v. Wade in the United States Supreme Court. A separate minority report criticizing the process and reaching different conclusions was also released.

The South Dakota legislature passed a law in 2006 that would have banned abortion in the state. Several members of the South Dakota legislative majority, as well as Governor Rounds, acknowledged that the overt goal of this law, the Women's Health and Human Life Protection Act, was to get the Supreme Court to overturn Roe. It was signed into law by Republican Governor Mike Rounds. Planned Parenthood successfully challenged the law using a ballot initiative instead of using the courts. The state was one of 23 states in 2007 to have a detailed abortion-specific informed consent requirement. In the informed consent materials given to women in Idaho, Oklahoma, South Dakota and Texas required by statute, the materials used graphic and inflammatory language. The law also required the woman be told how far advanced her pregnancy was. The informed consent materials in South Dakota, Texas, Utah and West Virginia given to women seeking abortions include counseling materials that say women who have abortions may have suicidal thoughts or they may experience "postabortion traumatic stress syndrome". The latter syndrome is not recognized by American Psychological Association or the American Psychiatric Association. The written informed consent materials in South Dakota say "unborn child may feel physical pain" without specifying any time period during gestation. Conversely, The Journal of the American Medical Association has published notable work indicating that pain sensors do not develop in the fetus until between weeks 23 and 30.

In 2008, the South Dakota legislature passed another anti-abortion law, this time one that would have banned abortion in all cases except for rape, incest, and the health of the woman. Planned Parenthood again successfully challenged this using a ballot initiative instead of using the courts. In 2013, the Targeted Regulation of Abortion Providers (TRAP) state law applied to medication-induced abortions and private doctor offices in addition to abortion clinics. The state had a law on the books in August 2018 that would be triggered if Roe v. Wade was overturned. (The Supreme Court did overturn Roe v. Wade in Dobbs v. Jackson Women's Health Organization, No. 19-1392, 597 U.S. ___ (2022) .) As of 2018, South Dakota prohibits the use of state funds for abortions unless the mother's life is in danger. In mid-May 2019, state law banned abortion after week 22. On September 7, 2021, during the COVID-19 pandemic, Governor Kristi Noem signed an executive order requiring in-person medical visits—not merely telehealth appointments—for the prescription of medication abortions.

=== Ballot box history ===
A referendum to repeal the Women's Health and Human Life Protection Act was placed on ballot for the November 2006 statewide election due to a successful petition drive by the organization South Dakota Campaign for Healthy Families. On May 30, over 38,000 petition signatures were filed, more than twice the 17,000 required to place a measure on the ballot. On November 7, WHHLPA was repealed by the South Dakota electorate; the vote was 56%-44% favoring repeal. In 2008, Right to Life of South Dakota gathered enough signatures to put an initiative measure on the ballot. Initiative Measure 11 would have restricted abortion to cases involving rape, incest, and the woman's health. That initiative was defeated, by a vote of 55%-45%.

=== Judicial history ===
The US Supreme Court's decision in 1973's Roe v. Wade ruling meant the state could no longer regulate abortion in the first trimester. However, the Supreme Court overturned Roe v. Wade in Dobbs v. Jackson Women's Health Organization, No. 19-1392, 597 U.S. ___ (2022) . In Planned Parenthood v. Rounds (2012), the United States Court of Appeals for the Eighth Circuit ruled that a South Dakota law requiring doctors to give patients information about the potential suicide risk in women who have abortions was not unconstitutional.

=== Clinic history ===
In 1967, physician Benjamin Munson opened an illegal abortion clinic in Rapid City. He was arrested and charged in 1969 for performing an illegal abortion on a 19-year-old woman. Munson appealed his conviction and won at the circuit court, but after the state appealed the decision, the South Dakota Supreme Court ruled against him. The Roe v. Wade decision rendered his further appeals moot. Munson retired in 1986.

In 1981, Dr. Buck Williams started offering abortion services at his Sioux Falls clinic. At the time, he was the only abortion service provider in the state. In 1989, he approached Planned Parenthood about taking over his clinic. At the time, Planned Parenthood had no operations in South Dakota. It agreed, and has been the state's only abortion service provider ever since. Planned Parenthood moved out of their old building, and the building was taken over by AlphaCenter and run by Leslee Unruh. Another clinic had opened in the stated by 1982 but was closed by 1992. In the period between 1992 and 1996, the state saw no change in the total number of abortion clinics. While only three states saw gains in this period, this state was one of four to see no changes, with only one abortion clinic in the state in 1996.

In 2014, there was still only one abortion clinic in the state. In 2014, 98% of the counties in the state did not have an abortion clinic. That year, 77% of women in the state aged 15–44 lived in a county without an abortion clinic. In 2016, only a small section of the state required women to drive fewer than 40 miles to access an abortion clinic. In 2017, there was still only one Planned Parenthood clinic, which offered abortion services, in a state with a population of 181,145 women aged 15–49. The Planned Parenthood clinic was still the only abortion clinic in the state. Unable to find local doctors to run the clinic, it hired four doctors who flew in from out of state to work on rotation. In May 2019, the state was officially one of six in the nation with only one abortion clinic.

After the Dobbs v. Jackson Women's Health Organization decision , Planned Parenthood stopped offering abortion services in the state .

== Statistics ==
In the period between 1972 and 1974, there were zero recorded illegal abortion deaths in the state. In 1990, 72,000 women in the state faced the risk of an unintended pregnancy.

The lowest number of legal induced abortions by state in 2000 occurred in Idaho with 801, while South Dakota was second with 878, and North Dakota was third with 1,341. Idaho had the fewest induced abortions in 2001 with 738, while South Dakota was second with 895, and North Dakota was third with 1,216. In 2003, the state of South Dakota had the lowest number of legal induced abortions with 819. Idaho was second with 911, while North Dakota was third with 1,354. In 2013, among white women aged 15–19, there were 70 abortions, 10 abortions for black women aged 15–19, 0 abortions for Hispanic women aged 15–19, and 10 abortions for women of all other races. In 2014, 48% of adults said in a poll by the Pew Research Center that abortion should be legal in all or most cases. In 2017, the state had an infant mortality rate of 7.7 deaths per 1,000 live births.

Number of reported abortions, abortion rate and percentage change in rate by geographic region and state in 1992, 1995 and 1996
Census division and state	Number			Rate			% change 1992–1996
Census division and state	1992	1995	1996	1992	1995	1996	% change 1992–1996
West North Central	57,340	48,530	48,660	14.3	11.9	11.9	–16
Iowa	6,970	6,040	5,780	11.4	9.8	9.4	–17
Kansas	12,570	10,310	10,630	22.4	18.3	18.9	–16
Minnesota	16,180	14,910	14,660	15.6	14.2	13.9	–11
Missouri	13,510	10,540	10,810	11.6	8.9	9.1	–21
Nebraska	5,580	4,360	4,460	15.7	12.1	12.3	–22
North Dakota	1,490	1,330	1,290	10.7	9.6	9.4	–13
South Dakota	1,040	1,040	1,030	6.8	6.6	6.5	–4

Number, rate, and ratio of reported abortions, by reporting area of residence and occurrence and by percentage of abortions obtained by out-of-state residents, US CDC estimates
Location	Residence			Occurrence			% obtained by out-of-state residents	Year	Ref
Location	No.	Rate^	Ratio^^	No.	Rate^	Ratio^^	% obtained by out-of-state residents	Year	Ref
South Dakota				1,040	6.8			1992	
South Dakota				1,040	6.6			1995	
South Dakota				1,030	6.5			1996	
South Dakota	755	4.8	61	551	3.5	45	13.6	2014	
South Dakota	659	4.2	53	444	2.8	36	13.3	2015	
South Dakota	664	4.2	54	472	3.0	38	12.9	2016	
^number of abortions per 1,000 women aged 15–44; ^^number of abortions per 1,000 live births

== Abortion rights views and activities ==
=== Protests ===
Women from the state participated in marches supporting abortion rights as part of a #StoptheBans movement in May 2019.

Following the overturn of Roe v. Wade on June 24, 2022, six people were arrested on June 29 following an abortion rights protest in Sioux Falls. On July 9–10, hundreds of abortion rights protesters rallied and marched in Sioux Falls and Rapid City. On July 23, about 100 abortion rights protesters rallied and marched at the South Dakota State Capitol in Pierre. Abortion rights protests were also held at the University of South Dakota in Vermillion.

On May 1, 2024, Dakotans For Health submitted a petition with over 55,000 signatures to get abortion rights on the ballot in the November 2024 election, more than the 35,000 signatures required. The proposed amendment to the state constitution would legalize abortion in the first trimester.

== Anti-abortion views and activities ==
=== Organizations ===
Alpha Center is a crisis pregnancy center based in Sioux Falls and run by Leslee Unruh.

=== Violence ===
In October 1999, Martin Uphoff set fire to a Planned Parenthood clinic in Sioux Falls, causing $100 worth of damage. He was later sentenced to 60 months in prison.
