= Alice McCoy =

Alice McCoy may refer to:

- Alice McCoy (Digimon), fictional animated character
- Alice McCoy (politician), South Dakota state representative
