= Raytheon Production Corp. v. Commissioner =

- Court: United States Court of Appeals for the First Circuit
- Full case name: Raytheon Production Corporation v. Commissioner of Internal Revenue
- Decided: July 28, 1944
- Citation: 144 F.2d 110

Case history
- Subsequent history: Cert. denied, 323 U.S. 779 (1944)

Court membership
- Judges sitting: Calvert Magruder, John Christopher Mahoney, Peter Woodbury

Case opinions
- Majority: Mahoney, joined by a unanimous court

Laws applied
- Internal Revenue Code

Keywords
- Good will; return of capital

Raytheon Production Corp. v. Commissioner, 144 F.2d 110 (1st Cir. 1944), cert. denied, 323 U.S. 779 (1944) is a United States income tax case that discusses the tax deductibility of damages for loss of business good will. It included the following holdings:

- Under the tax code, business good will is not the present value of future profits, but present capital.

- Thus, damages for the destruction of goodwill (awarded under the Federal Antitrust Laws) are compensating for the destruction of a capital asset -- they are a "return" of this capital.

- It is settled law that, while a recovery (as court-ordered damages) of future profits is taxable, a recovery (as damages) of present capital is not.
- However, it is also settled law that compensatory damages are not tax-exempt just because they are a return of capital. Exemption applies only to the portion of these damages that recovers the cost basis of that capital; any excess damages serve to realize prior appreciation, and should be taxed as income.
- In this case, the basis is treated as zero because Raytheon is unable to establish it.

(Generally, goodwill has a basis of zero because the costs that generate it are themselves immediately deductible (as expenses for advertising, PR, etc). However, goodwill can acquire a basis, e.g. as a portion of the cost of purchasing another business.)

== Facts ==
Raytheon built up business good will on a rectifier tube that it developed, patented, and licensed to manufacturers. RCA licensed a competing tube to many of the same manufacturers, with a clause requiring the licensee to only buy from RCA. These antitrust practices caused a significant decline in Raytheon’s market share, eventually leading to the complete destruction of Raytheon’s business good will in this product market. RCA paid $410,000 to settle Raytheon's claims under the Federal Antitrust Laws, but in the same transaction also acquired rights to some 30 patents, and declined to state how much of its payment should be allocated between the patent license rights versus the settlement of the suit.

In its tax return, Raytheon chose to allocate $60,000 of the settlement to the value of the patents, thus claiming only this amount as income and excluding the remaining $350,000 as damages. The Commissioner determined that the $350,000 constituted income. It did not immediately argue that any damage recovery for loss of good will is always taxable as income; rather, it protested that "[t]here exists no clear evidence of what the amount was paid for so that an accurate apportionment can be made." At trial, Raytheon gave evidence to support its valuation of the patents; it also assessed the value of its lost business good will (at $3,000,000) by introducing evidence of its profitability.

== Issues ==
First: Are damages for the destruction of business good will taxable income—or a return of capital, of which any recovery of basis is non-taxable?

Second: If the recovery is non-taxable, did the Tax Court err in holding that there was insufficient evidence to enable it to determine what part of the lump sum payment was properly allocable to the settlement?

== Holding and Decision ==
Tax law treats recoveries as "income" when they represent compensation for loss of profits. Thus, the test for taxability is: What loss were the damages designed to compensate for? -- "In lieu of what were the damages awarded?"

Tax law treats business good will not as future profits (which are fully taxable when recovered as damages), but as present capital—even though evidence of future profitability must be introduced to evaluate it. Thus, damages for its destruction are designed to compensate for the destruction of a capital asset—they are a "return" of this capital.

However, tax law does not exempt compensatory damages just because they are a return of capital—exemption applies only to the portion that recovers the cost basis of that capital; any excess damages serve to realize prior appreciation, and should be taxed as income.

In this case, the record is devoid of evidence as to the amount of that basis. This Court agrees with the Tax Court that "in the absence of evidence of the basis ... the amount of any nontaxable capital recovery cannot be ascertained." Since Raytheon could not establish the cost basis of its good will, its basis will be treated as zero. The Court concludes that the $350,000 of the $410,000 attributable to the suit is thus taxable income. (Thus, the second question as to allocation between this and the ordinary income from patent licenses is not present.)

== Notes ==
In this case, the Court treated the basis as zero because Raytheon was unable to establish it. Generally, the basis of goodwill is zero because it consists of costs that are themselves immediately deductible—expenses for advertising, PR, etc. However, goodwill can acquire a basis, e.g. as a portion of the cost of purchasing another business.

== See also ==
- Clark v. Commissioner
- Commissioner v. Glenshaw Glass Co.
