= List of acts of the Parliament of Victoria from 1999 =

This is a list of acts of the Parliament of Victoria, Australia for the year 1999.

== 1999 ==
Short title, or popular name	Citation	Royal assent
Long title
Barley Marketing (Amendment) Act 1999 (repealed)	No. 1 of 1999	28 April 1999
An Act to make further provision relating to the marketing of barley, to dissolve the Australian Barley Board, to amend the Barley Marketing Act 1993 (Note: Barley Marketing Act 1993 (No. 7 of 1993)) and for other purposes. (Repealed by Statute Law (Further Revision) Act 2002 (No. 11 of 2002))
Environment Protection (Amendment) Act 1999 (repealed)	No. 2 of 1999	28 April 1999
An Act to amend the Environment Protection Act 1970 (Note: Environment Protection Act 1970 (No. 8056)) to make further provision for industry waste reduction agreements, State environment protection policy and the transport of waste and to impose further landfill levies and for other purposes. (Repealed by Statute Law (Further Revision) Act 2002 (No. 11 of 2002))
Statute Law Revision (Repeals) Act 1999 (repealed)	No. 3 of 1999	28 April 1999
An Act to revise the Statute Law of Victoria and for other purposes. (Repealed by Statute Law (Further Revision) Act 2002 (No. 11 of 2002))
Tattersall Consultations (Amendment) Act 1999 (repealed)	No. 4 of 1999	28 April 1999
An Act to amend the Tattersall Consultations Act 1958 (Note: Tattersall Consultations Act 1958 (No. 6390)) and for other purposes. (Repealed by Statute Law (Further Revision) Act 2002 (No. 11 of 2002))
Transport Accident (Further Amendment) Act 1999 (repealed)	No. 5 of 1999	
(Repealed by Statute Law (Further Revision) Act 2002 (No. 11 of 2002))
Transport Acts (Further Amendment) Act 1999 (repealed)	No. 6 of 1999	
(Repealed by Statute Law (Further Revision) Act 2002 (No. 11 of 2002))
Coroners (Amendment) Act 1999 (repealed)	No. 7 of 1999	
(Repealed by Statute Law (Further Revision) Act 2002 (No. 11 of 2002))
Government Superannuation Act 1999	No. 8 of 1999	11 May 1999
An Act to provide for the administration of certain Victorian superannuation schemes, to repeal the Public Sector Superannuation (Administration) Act 1993, (Note: Public Sector Superannuation (Administration) Act 1993 (No. 110 of 1993)) to consequentially amend certain other Acts and for other purposes.
Legal Practice (Practising Certificates) Act 1999 (repealed)	No. 9 of 1999	11 May 1999
(Repealed by Statute Law (Further Revision) Act 2002 (No. 11 of 2002))
Magistrates' Court (Amendment) Act 1999 (repealed)	No. 10 of 1999	11 May 1999
(Repealed by Statute Law (Further Revision) Act 2002 (No. 11 of 2002))
Office of the Regulator-General (Amendment) Act 1999 (repealed)	No. 11 of 1999	11 May 1999
(Repealed by Statute Law (Further Revision) Act 2002 (No. 11 of 2002))
Public Sector Reform (Further Amendments) Act 1999 (repealed)	No. 12 of 1999	11 May 1999
(Repealed by Statute Law (Further Revision) Act 2002 (No. 11 of 2002))
Superannuation Acts (Further Amendment) Act 1999 (repealed)	No. 13 of 1999	11 May 1999
(Repealed by Statute Law (Further Revision) Act 2002 (No. 11 of 2002))
Year 2000 Information Disclosure Act 1999	No. 14 of 1999	11 May 1999
An Act to encourage the voluntary disclosure and exchange of information about year 2000 computer problems and remediation efforts and for other purposes.
Education Acts (Amendment) Act 1999 (repealed)	No. 15 of 1999	
(Repealed by Statute Law (Further Revision) Act 2002 (No. 11 of 2002))
Fair Trading Act 1999	No. 16 of 1999	18 May 1999
An Act to re-enact with amendments laws relating to trading practices, to make further provision about trading practices, to repeal the Consumer Affairs Act 1972, (Note: Consumer Protection Act 1972 (No. 8276)) the Ministry of Consumer Affairs Act 1973, (Note: Ministry of Consumer Affairs Act 1973 (No. 8442)) the Fair Trading Act 1985 (Note: Fair Trading Act 1985 (No. 10201)) and the Market Court Act 1978 (Note: Market Court Act 1978 (No. 9196)) and for other purposes.
Fair Trading (Inspectors Powers and Other Amendments) Act 1999 (repealed)	No. 17 of 1999	18 May 1999
(Repealed by Statute Law (Further Revision) Act 2002 (No. 11 of 2002))
Rural Finance (Amendment) Act 1999 (repealed)	No. 18 of 1999	18 May 1999
(Repealed by Statute Law (Further Revision) Act 2002 (No. 11 of 2002))
Sentencing (Amendment) Act 1999 (repealed)	No. 19 of 1999	18 May 1999
(Repealed by Statute Law (Further Revision) Act 2002 (No. 11 of 2002))
State Trustees (State Owned Company) (Amendment) Act 1999 (repealed)	No. 20 of 1999	18 May 1999
(Repealed by Statute Law (Further Revision) Act 2002 (No. 11 of 2002))
Surveillance Devices Act 1999	No. 21 of 1999	18 May 1999
An Act to regulate the installation, use and maintenance of surveillance devices and restrict the publication of information gained from their use, to repeal the Listening Devices Act 1969, (Note: Listening Devices Act 1969 (No. 7804)) to amend the Evidence Act 1958 (Note: Evidence Act 1958 (No. 6246)) and for other purposes.
Water Acts (Amendment) Act 1999 (repealed)	No. 22 of 1999	
(Repealed by Statute Law (Further Revision) Act 2002 (No. 11 of 2002))
Local Government (Melbourne City Council Rates) Act 1999 (repealed)	No. 23 of 1999	
(Repealed by Statute Law (Further Revision) Act 2002 (No. 11 of 2002))
Constitution Act Amendment (Amendment) Act 1999 (repealed)	No. 24 of 1999	
(Repealed by Statute Law (Further Revision) Act 2002 (No. 11 of 2002))
Ambulance Services (Further Amendment) Act 1999 (repealed)	No. 25 of 1999	
(Repealed by Statute Law (Further Revision) Act 2002 (No. 11 of 2002))
Dental Practice Act 1999	No. 26 of 1999	1 June 1999
An Act to make further provision for the registration of dental care providers and investigations into the professional conduct and fitness to practise of registered dental care providers, to regulate dental care services, to establish a Dental Practice Board of Victoria and a Dental Practice Board Fund, to repeal the Dentists Act 1972 (Note: Dentists Act 1972 (No. 8287)) and the Dental Technicians Act 1972 (Note: Dental Technicians Act 1972 (No. 8366)) and for other purposes.
Land (Reservations and other Matters) Act 1999	No. 27 of 1999	1 June 1999
An Act to provide for the revocation of the reservations over certain pieces of land, to provide for the re-reservation of certain land and for other purposes.
Marine (Amendment) Act 1999 (repealed)	No. 28 of 1999	
(Repealed by Statute Law (Further Revision) Act 2002 (No. 11 of 2002))
Mental Health (Amendment) Act 1999 (repealed)	No. 29 of 1999	
(Repealed by Statute Law (Further Revision) Act 2002 (No. 11 of 2002))
Police Regulation and Firearms (Amendment) Act 1999 (repealed)	No. 30 of 1999	
(Repealed by Statute Law (Further Revision) Act 2002 (No. 11 of 2002))
Shrine of Remembrance (Amendment) Act 1999 (repealed)	No. 31 of 1999	
(Repealed by Statute Law (Further Revision) Act 2002 (No. 11 of 2002))
Stamps (Amendment) Act 1999 (repealed)	No. 32 of 1999	
(Repealed by Statute Law (Further Revision) Act 2002 (No. 11 of 2002))
Australia Acts (Request) Act 1999	No. 33 of 1999	8 June 1999
An Act to request the amendment of the Australia Acts 1986 (Note: Australia Act 1986 (c. 2 (UK))) (Note: Australia Act 1986 (No. 142 of 1985 (Cth))) in connection with proposed constitutional arrangements to establish the Commonwealth of Australia as a republic.
Commonwealth Places (Mirror Taxes Administration) Act 1999	No. 34 of 1999	8 June 1999
An Act to provide for the administration and operation of State taxing laws that are applied as Commonwealth laws in relation to Commonwealth places, to make consequential amendments to State taxing laws and for other purposes.
Crimes (Criminal Trials) Act 1999 (repealed)	No. 35 of 1999	8 June 1999
An Act to improve the efficiency of criminal trials, to amend the Crimes Act 1958, (Note: Crimes Act 1958 (No. 6231)) the Evidence Act 1958, the Magistrates' Court Act 1989 (Note: Magistrates' Court Act 1989 (No. 51 of 1989)) and the Sentencing Act 1991, (Note: Sentencing Act 1991 (No. 49 of 1991)) to repeal the Crimes (Criminal Trials) Act 1993 (Note: Crimes (Criminal Trials) Act 1993 (No. 60 of 1993)) and for other purposes. (Repealed by Criminal Procedure Act 2009 (No. 7 of 2009))
Electricity Industry Acts (Further Amendment) Act 1999	No. 36 of 1999	8 June 1999
An Act to amend the Electricity Industry Act 1993 (Note: Electricity Industry Act 1993 (No. 130 of 1993)) and the Electricity Safety Act 1998 (Note: Electricity Safety Act 1998 (No. 25 of 1998)) and for other purposes.
Financial Sector Reform (Victoria) Act 1999	No. 37 of 1999	8 June 1999
An Act to make provision for the reform of the financial sector, to amend and repeal the Financial Institutions (Victoria) Act 1992 (Note: Financial Institutions (Victoria) Act 1992 (No. 48 of 1992)) and the Friendly Societies (Victoria) Act 1996 (Note: Friendly Societies (Victoria) Act 1996 (No. 83 of 1996)) and to amend the Co-operative Housing Societies Act 1958 (Note: Co-operative Housing Societies Act 1958 (No. 6226)) and certain other Acts and for other purposes.
Freedom of Information (Amendment) Act 1999 (repealed)	No. 38 of 1999	8 June 1999
(Repealed by Statute Law (Further Revision) Act 2002 (No. 11 of 2002))
Gas Industry Acts (Further Amendment) Act 1999 (repealed)	No. 39 of 1999	8 June 1999
(Repealed by Statute Law (Further Revision) Act 2002 (No. 11 of 2002))
Guardianship and Administration (Amendment) Act 1999 (repealed)	No. 40 of 1999	8 June 1999
(Repealed by Statute Law (Further Revision) Act 2002 (No. 11 of 2002))
Interactive Gaming (Player Protection) Act 1999	No. 41 of 1999	8 June 1999
An Act relating to interactive gaming, to make certain consequential amendments and for other purposes.
Longford Royal Commission (Report) Act 1999	No. 42 of 1999	8 June 1999
An Act to make provision for the publication of the report of the Longford Royal Commission and for other purposes.
New Tax System Price Exploitation Code (Victoria) Act 1999	No. 43 of 1999	8 June 1999
An Act to apply certain laws of the Commonwealth relating to the New Tax System Price Exploitation Code as laws of Victoria, to make a consequential amendment to the Competition Policy Reform (Victoria) Act 1995 (Note: Competition Policy Reform (Victoria) Act 1995 (No. 74 of 1995)) and for other purposes.
Prostitution Control (Amendment) Act 1999 (repealed)	No. 44 of 1999	8 June 1999
(Repealed by Statute Law (Further Revision) Act 2002 (No. 11 of 2002))
Rail Corporations and Transport Acts (Amendment) Act 1999 (repealed)	No. 45 of 1999	8 June 1999
(Repealed by Statute Law (Further Revision) Act 2002 (No. 11 of 2002))
Royal Park Land Act 1999	No. 46 of 1999	8 June 1999
An Act to make provision in relation to land at Royal Park.
State Taxation Acts (Amendment) Act 1999 (repealed)	No. 47 of 1999	
(Repealed by Statute Law (Further Revision) Act 2002 (No. 11 of 2002))
Appropriation (1999/2000) Act 1999	No. 48 of 1999	16 June 1999
An Act for the appropriation of certain sums out of the Consolidated Fund in respect of the financial year 1999/2000 and for other purposes.
Appropriation (Parliament 1999/2000) Act 1999	No. 49 of 1999	16 June 1999
An Act for the appropriation of certain sums out of the Consolidated Fund for the Parliament in respect of the financial year 1999/2000 and for other purposes.
Essential Services (Year 2000) Act 1999	No. 50 of 1999	7 December 1999
An Act to provide a temporary system of emergency powers to deal with events arising from year 2000 computer problems, to amend the Emergency Management Act 1986 (Note: Emergency Management Act 1986 (No. 30 of 1986)) and for other purposes.
Health Practitioners (Special Events Exemption) Act 1999	No. 51 of 1999	7 December 1999
An Act to allow visiting health practitioners to provide health care services in the State in connection with special events without becoming registered under State law and for other purposes.
Legal Practice (Amendment) Act 1999 (repealed)	No. 52 of 1999	
(Repealed by Statute Law (Further Revision) Act 2002 (No. 11 of 2002))
Audit (Amendment) Act 1999 (repealed)	No. 53 of 1999	
(Repealed by Statute Law (Further Revision) Act 2002 (No. 11 of 2002))
Federal Courts (State Jurisdiction) Act 1999	No. 54 of 1999	14 December 1999
An Act relating to the ineffective conferral of jurisdiction on the Federal Court of Australia and the Family Court of Australia with respect to certain matters, to amend the Competition Policy Reform (Victoria) Act 1995 (Note: Competition Policy Reform (Victoria) Act 1995 (No. 74 of 1995)) and the New Tax System Price Exploitation Code (Victoria) Act 1999 (Note: New Tax System Price Exploitation Code (Victoria) Act 1999 (No. 43 of 1999)) and for other purposes.
Parliamentary Committees (Amendment) Act 1999	No. 55 of 1999	14 December 1999
An Act to amend the Parliamentary Committees Act 1968 (Note: Parliamentary Committees Act 1968 (No. 7727)) and for other purposes.
Crimes at Sea Act 1999	No. 56 of 1999	21 December 1999
An Act to give effect to a cooperative scheme for dealing with crimes at sea, to repeal the Crimes (Offences at Sea) Act 1978, (Note: Crimes (Offences at Sea) Act 1978 (No. 9229)) to amend the Interpretation of Legislation Act 1984 (Note: Interpretation of Legislation Act 1984 (No. 10096)) and for other purposes.
Freedom of Information (Miscellaneous Amendments) Act 1999 (repealed)	No. 57 of 1999	21 December 1999
(Repealed by Statute Law (Further Revision) Act 2002 (No. 11 of 2002))
Gas Industry (Amendment) Act 1999 (repealed)	No. 58 of 1999	21 December 1999
(Repealed by Statute Law (Further Revision) Act 2002 (No. 11 of 2002))
Local Government (Best Value Principles) Act 1999 (repealed)	No. 59 of 1999	21 December 1999
(Repealed by Statute Law (Further Revision) Act 2002 (No. 11 of 2002))
Melbourne Sports and Aquatic Centre (Amendment) Act 1999 (repealed)	No. 60 of 1999	21 December 1999
(Repealed by Statute Law (Further Revision) Act 2002 (No. 11 of 2002))
Police Regulation (Amendment) Act 1999 (repealed)	No. 61 of 1999	21 December 1999
(Repealed by Statute Law (Further Revision) Act 2002 (No. 11 of 2002))
Public Prosecutions (Amendment) Act 1999 (repealed)	No. 62 of 1999	21 December 1999
(Repealed by Statute Law (Further Revision) Act 2002 (No. 11 of 2002))
Rail Corporations and Transport Acts (Miscellaneous Amendments) Act 1999 (repealed)	No. 63 of 1999	21 December 1999
(Repealed by Statute Law (Further Revision) Act 2002 (No. 11 of 2002))
Regional Infrastructure Development Fund Act 1999	No. 64 of 1999	21 December 1999
An Act to provide for a fund to be called the Regional Infrastructure Development Fund to be established in the Public Account as part of the Trust Fund and for other purposes.
Water (Waterway Management Tariffs) Act 1999 (repealed)	No. 65 of 1999	21 December 1999
An Act to amend the Water Act 1989 (Note: Water Act 1989 (No. 80 of 1989)) to remove the power of Catchment Management Authorities to set tariffs in respect of certain functions exercised by those Authorities under the Water Act 1989 and to provide for transitional arrangements for fees previously imposed by those Authorities under those tariffs and for other purposes. (Repealed by Statute Law (Further Revision) Act 2002 (No. 11 of 2002))

== Sources ==
- "Acts as made: 1999". Victoria Legislation.
