= Treble damages =

Right of a court to triple the amount of the actual/compensatory damages awarded

In United States law, treble damages is a term that indicates that a statute permits a court to triple the amount of the actual/compensatory damages to be awarded to a prevailing plaintiff. Treble damages are usually a multiple of, rather than an addition to, actual damages, but on occasion they are additive, as in California Civil Code § 1719. When such damages are multiplicative and a person received an award of $100 for an injury, a court applying treble damages would raise the award to $300.

== Application ==
Some statutes mandate awards of treble damages for all violations, such as the Clayton Antitrust Act and RICO. Some statutes allow for an award of treble damages only if there is a showing that the violation was willful. For example, "up to three times the amount found or assessed" may be awarded by a court in the United States for willful patent infringement. The idea behind the creation of such damages is that they will encourage citizens to sue for violations that are harmful to society in general, and deter the violator from committing future violations.

The United States Supreme Court determined in Commissioner v. Glenshaw Glass Co. that, like compensatory damages, which are not exempt from federal income tax (unless the award is from a personal injury claim), such taxes must be paid on the excess amount (the amount that exceeds the actual damages) of treble damages. Furthermore, some foreign governments will assist U.S. citizens in collecting damages, but not treble damage awards, which are considered penal.

== See also ==
- Punitive damages – Damages assessed in order to punish the defendant for outrageous conduct
