= Greg Blanc =

American politician

Member of the South Dakota Senate from the 35th district
- Incumbent
- Assumed office January 14, 2025
- Preceded by: Mike Walsh

Personal details
- Party: Republican
- Website: gregblancforsenate.com

Greg Blanc is an American politician. He serves as a Republican member for the 35th district in the South Dakota State Senate since 2025. His district stretches from eastern Rapid City to Box Elder. He defeated Mike Walsh in the Republican primary.
