= ExxonMobil Australia =

Australian affiliate of ExxonMobil

- Type: Division
- Industry: Energy
- Founded: 1933; 93 years ago
- Headquarters: Melbourne, Australia
- Products: Oil and natural gas exploration, production, marketing
- Parent: ExxonMobil
- Subsidiaries: Mobil Australia
- Website: exxonmobil.com.au

ExxonMobil Australia (formerly Esso Australia) is an Australian affiliate of ExxonMobil, the U.S.-based oil giant. It operates a number of oil and gas platforms in Bass Strait, south east of Melbourne, Australia, as well as a gas processing facility at Longford and Long Island Point (LIP) in Hastings.

ExxonMobil Australia operates retail petrol operations under the Mobil brand. Prior to the merger of Exxon and Mobil in 1999, Esso Australia also previously operated retail petrol operations for 63 years until 1990, when its stations were acquired by Mobil.

== History ==
Between 1933 and 1962 Esso was owned by Stanvac or Standard Oil. The trademark for Esso was first registered in 1937. After 1962 Esso's Australian operations were known as Esso Standard Oil (Australia) Pty Ltd.

On 25 September 1998, the Esso Longford gas explosion killed two and injured eight others. As Victoria's largest supplier of natural gas the aftermath was considerable with hundreds of thousands of homes affected. Many Victorians experienced 20 days without gas hot-water or heating. A Royal Commission was held finding Esso responsible for the accident. Esso was also found guilty by jury verdict of 11 offences under the Occupational Health and Safety Act and fined $2 million.

In November 1999, Esso and Mobil finalised its merger to form ExxonMobil globally. The Australian affiliates of both companies also merged to form ExxonMobil Australia. The merged company inherited the Adelaide and Altona refineries. The Adelaide refinery closed in 2003 and was demolished in 2009.

In November 2012 there was a crude oil spill at Longford.

== Projects ==
Esso is proceeding with plans to build a Gas Conditioning Plant adjacent to its existing facilities at Longford. The facility will remove carbon dioxide from natural gas and is being built in conjunction with BHP Billiton.

== Industrial disputes ==
Esso's Longford plant and its related offshore facilities in the Bass Strait have been the focus of a prolonged industrial dispute related to the company's outsourced maintenance workforce.

Scaffolders, electricians, boilermakers and fitters were employed to maintain gas equipment up until 2017 by Esso contractor UGL in a joint venture with KAEFER Integrated Services, a German engineering and maintenance corporation.

UGL won the contract outright in 2017 and offered the workforce their roles back on reduced pay and conditions under a new enterprise agreement through its subsidiary MTCT Services. The MTCT agreement was filed with the Fair Work Commission in late 2016. Those filings indicate the agreement was voted on and approved by five casual workers employed by MTCT in Western Australia. There is no indication that the workers had any experience in gas facilities maintenance or intended to work at Esso's Victorian facilities.

Unions representing the workers allege the enterprise agreement was not negotiated with the Victorian workforce, making it unrepresentative. That would put the company's conduct in direct conflict with ExxonMobil's global 'Statement on labour and the workplace', which commits the company to the right to collective bargaining.

A majority of the affected workers at Longford refused UGL's offer and have been protesting outside the facility since 20 June 2017. Esso and the unions representing the workers have criticised each other in the media. In July Esso lodged a complaint to have a large inflatable rat removed from the protest and signs removed that referred to UGL's replacement workforce as 'scabs'.

== Corporate tax avoidance ==
In November 2017 workers affected by Esso contractor UGL's pay cuts travelled to Canberra to highlight the tax practices of Esso's parent company, ExxonMobil Australia.

Between 2013/14 and 2015/16 ExxonMobil Australia paid no corporate income tax on $24.7 billion in revenue. ExxonMobil argues that the company has paid a 'fair share' by contributing $12 billion in petroleum resource rent tax (PRRT) since the tax was introduced in 1990.

ExxonMobil executives were due to appear before the Australian Parliament's Senate Inquiry into Corporate Tax Avoidance in early 2018.

== Handovers ==
Woodside Energy has agreed to take over operatorship of the Bass Strait oil and gas assets from ExxonMobil’s Australian subsidiary as both companies keep existing equity stakes. By 2026, this deal is expected to be finished, Woodside Energy will operate the offshore facilities, both onshore processing plants and associated pipelines, with ExxonMobil’s workforce transferring across.

== See also ==
- Esso Australia Collection of Australian Art
