= Longford, Victoria =

Longford Victoria
- Coordinates: 38°09′51″S 147°05′13″E
- Population: 1,489 (2021 census)
- Postcode(s): 3851
- Elevation: 45 m (148 ft)
- Location: 216 km (134 mi) E of Melbourne; 13 km (8 mi) S of Sale
- LGA(s): Shire of Wellington
- County: Buln Buln
- State electorate(s): Gippsland South
- Federal division(s): Gippsland

Longford is a town in the Gippsland region of Victoria, Australia. At the 2021 census, Longford and the surrounding area had a population of 1,489.

It was named Longford because of the long ford across the rivers to get into Sale.

It is located at the junction of the South Gippsland Highway and the Longford-Rosedale Road, next to the Latrobe River. A new bridge over the floodprone Latrobe River was completed in 2006, replacing the historic swinging bridge. The road approach to the Sale Swing Bridge was prone to flooding, cutting the road to Sale, Victoria.

== ExxonMobil plant ==
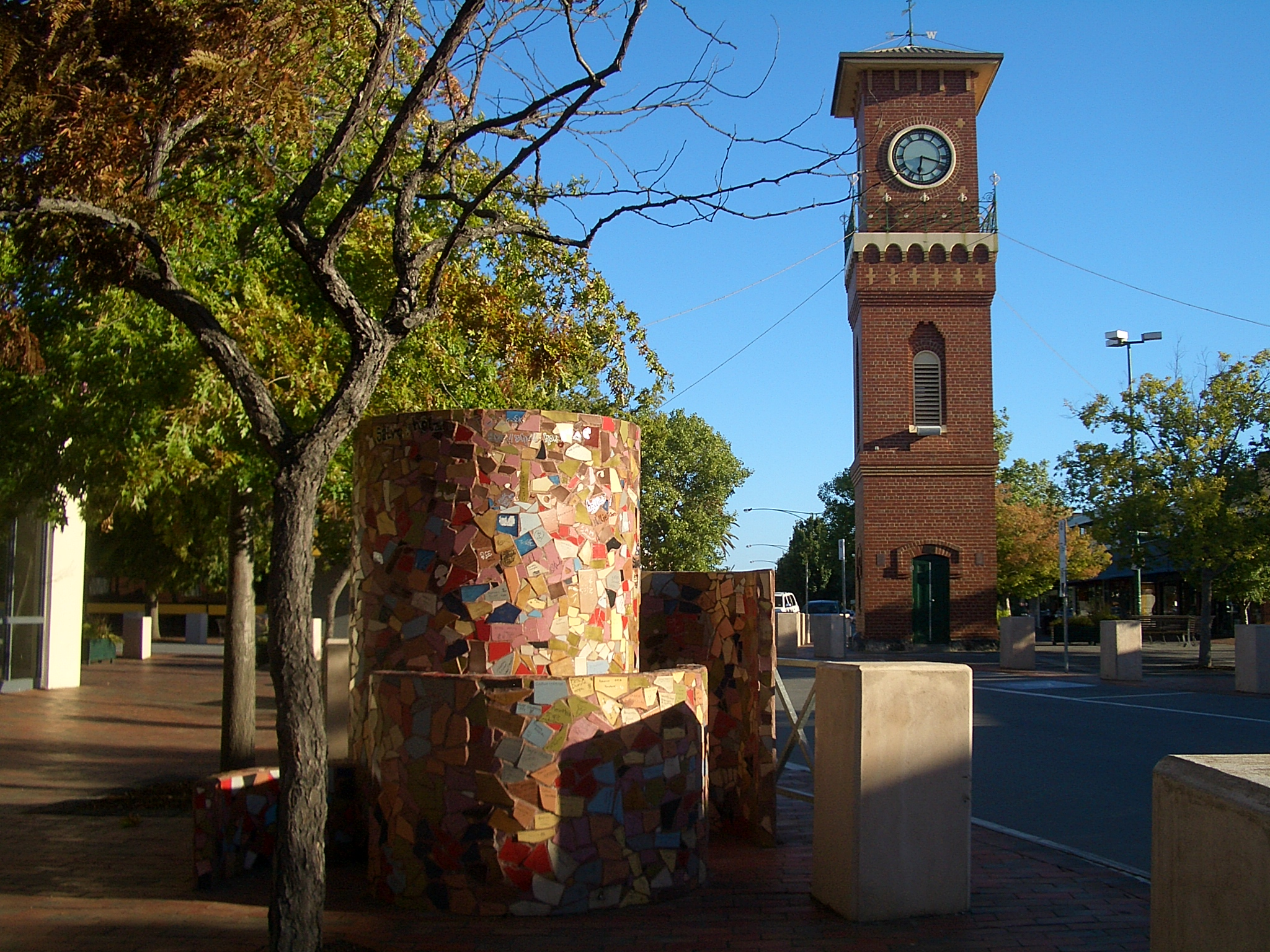
In the town centre

Oil and natural gas were discovered in the Bass Strait in 1965. Nearby Sale experienced a boom period when it became the service and residential base of the Esso-BHP oil and gas exploration and development program. The unprocessed oil and gas are pumped through 700 kilometres (430 mi) of undersea pipes to Longford. Here the hydrocarbons are removed and used to produce LPG, commercial-grade natural gas, and stabilised oil. The gas is piped to Melbourne and the Victorian gas grid and up to New South Wales via the Eastern gas pipeline with a branch running under Bass Strait to Tasmania and the oil to Westernport Bay and thence to Geelong and Altona from where it is shipped interstate and overseas.

In September 1998, a large fire at the oil and natural gas processing plant was responsible for an almost complete shutdown of Victoria's natural gas supply for weeks thereafter. At 12:25pm on 25 September 1998, heat exchanger GP905 cracked and failed catastrophically, instantly killing two people. A royal commission subsequently found that Esso breached health and safety rules, and was responsible for the explosion.

=== Chemical spill in water ===
PFAS chemicals were found in groundwater at Esso's plant by EPA Victoria in 2017. These chemicals are known to be linked to cancer in people and animals and had an impact on local agriculture and livestock operations and sale.
