= Blaine Campbell =

American politician (1940–2026)

Member of the South Dakota House of Representatives from the 35th district
- Incumbent
- Assumed office January 11, 2013 Serving with Don Kopp
- Preceded by: Mark Kirkeby

Personal details
- Born: March 28, 1940 San Antonio, Texas, U.S.
- Died: August 28, 2026 (aged 86) Rapid City, South Dakota, U.S.
- Party: Republican

Blaine Ballif "Chip" Campbell (March 28, 1940 – August 28, 2026) was an American politician who was a Republican member of the South Dakota House of Representatives, representing District 35 since January 11, 2013.

== Elections ==
In 2012, when incumbent Republican Representative Mark Kirkeby ran for South Dakota Senate and left a District 35 seat open, Campbell ran in the three-way June 5, 2012 Republican Primary and placed second with 486 votes (33.0%); in the four-way November 6, 2012 General election, incumbent Republican Representative Don Kopp took the first seat and Campbell took the second seat with 3,379 votes (27.18%) ahead of Democratic nominee Shane Liebig (who had run for Senate in 2008) and Jay Pond (who had run for the seat in 2010).

== Personal life and death ==
Campbell married Patricia Suzanne Thomas in 1970. They had two sons, one of which died at six months of age. Campbell died on August 28, 2026, at the age of 86.
