= Mike Walsh (politician) =

American politician

Member of the South Dakota Senate from the 35th district
- In office February 15, 2024 – January 14, 2025
- Preceded by: Jessica Castleberry
- Succeeded by: Greg Blanc

Personal details
- Party: Republican
- Website: walshforsouthdakota.com (archived)

Michael A. Walsh is an American politician. A member of the Republican Party, he represented the 35th district in the South Dakota Senate from February 2024 to January 2025. He was appointed by governor Kristi Noem following the resignation of Jessica Castleberry for alleged misuse of COVID-19 pandemic relief money. Walsh ran for a full term in 2024 South Dakota Senate election, but lost in a landslide to Greg Blanc.

== Life and career ==
Michael A. Walsh is a veteran of the United States Marine Corps. He is semi-fluent in Russian. Walsh also served as president of the South Dakota State Lodge of the Fraternal Order of Police (FOP). Around 1995, Walsh joined the Minnehaha County Sheriff's Office. In the early 2000s, he was an undercover detective for the office's narcotics unit, working to catch and arrest drug dealers and users in Minnehaha County. In 2018, Walsh and four others received an award from the Federal Law Enforcement Officers Association for their role in the killing of Tony Canfield. He retired from the office as captain in April 2021 to move to Rapid City. After moving there, Walsh opened the first polygraph exam business in Rapid City: Walsh Polygraph.

In August 2023, Jessica Castleberry, a Republican member of the South Dakota Senate representing the 35th district, resigned after reaching an agreement with the state government for accepting COVID-19 pandemic relief money in alleged violation of the law. The seat remained vacant for several months as governor Kristi Noem waited for the South Dakota Supreme Court's decision on the extent of the constitution's prohibition on conflicts of interest. After the court's ruling in February 2024, Noem appointed two people to the legislature: Kristin Conzet on February 10 and Walsh on February 12. Following his appointment, he resigned as president of the FOP to avoid any potential conflict of interest. As a member of the Senate, Walsh was appointed co-chair of a task force helping to prepare the Ellsworth Air Force Base for the arrival of a B-21 Bomber. He also questioned the broad nature of a bill that would have allowed prosecutors to seek the death penalty for people charged with child rape. In May 2024, Walsh accompanied Noem to a trip to the Mexico–United States border. Walsh ran for a full term in 2024. He received funding from South Dakota Strong, a political action committee founded by state legislator Lee Schoenbeck. Walsh lost in a landslide to Greg Blanc with a margin of nearly 16 points. Blanc would go on to win the general election unopposed and was sworn in on January 14, 2025.

== Electoral history ==
2024 South Dakota Senate district 35 Republican primary election
| Party | Candidate | Votes | % |
|---|---|---|---|
| Republican | Greg Blanc | 973 | 54.76% |
| Republican | Michael A. Walsh (incumbent) | 692 | 38.94% |
| Republican | Curtis Nupen | 112 | 6.30% |
| Total votes | | 1,777 | 100.00% |
