= Jessica Castleberry =

American politician and businesswoman

Member of the South Dakota Senate from the 35th district
- In office January 1, 2020 – August 17, 2023
- Preceded by: Lynne DiSanto
- Succeeded by: Mike Walsh

Personal details
- Born: October 7, 1982 (age 43) Rapid City, South Dakota
- Party: Republican

Jessica Castleberry (born October 7, 1982) is an American politician and businesswoman who served as a member of the South Dakota Senate from District 35. She was appointed to the senate by Governor Kristi Noem to replace Lynne DiSanto on December 31, 2019. She stepped down in 2023 following an investigation into her misclaiming federal COVID-19 funding.

== Personal life ==
Castleberry was born and raised in Rapid City, South Dakota, where she operates preschools and has served on the Rapid City Area Schools Strategic Planning Committee. Some of her preschools closed in 2024.

== Political career ==
Castleberry first entered politics after being appointed by the Governor of South Dakota, Kristi Noem to replace Lynne DiSanto due to DiSanto resigning her seat in order to move to Montana. She served on the Senate taxation and transportation committees. In 2020, during the COVID-19 pandemic in South Dakota, Castleberry applied for and accepted over $600,000 of COVID relief funding for her preschool and businesses, despite an initial warning from the South Dakota Supreme Court that it was unlawful for South Dakotan lawmakers to take federal funding under the Constitution of South Dakota.

The information that Castleberry had done this came to light in 2023, when Governor Noem revealed it in a press release due to a Social Services Department worker recognising her name on an application, and stated that Castleberry had voted on legislation related to the funding in a conflict of interest. The Attorney General of South Dakota demanded she repay the money or face legal action. Despite initially denying it, Castleberry resigned in August 2023 after agreeing to repay $500,000 in federal COVID-19 relief funds; the earlier acceptance of the funds was determined to have violated the South Dakota constitution. Though she started making payments, by 2025 she had stopped making payments.
