= Commissioner v. Indianapolis Power & Light Co. =

Commissioner v. Indianapolis Power & Light Company
- Supreme Court of the United States

Argued October 31, 1989 Decided January 9, 1990
- Full case name: Commissioner of Internal Revenue v. Indianapolis Power & Light Company
- Citations: 493 U.S. 203 (more) 110 S. Ct. 589, 107 L. Ed. 2d 591

Case history
- Prior: 88 T.C. 964 (1987), affirmed by 857 F.2d 1162 (7th Cir. 1988)

Holding
- Because customers were entitled to a refund of their deposit, the utility lacked complete dominion over the funds, so the deposits did not constitute taxable income to the utility.

Court membership
- Chief Justice William Rehnquist Associate Justices William J. Brennan Jr. · Byron White; Thurgood Marshall · Harry Blackmun; John P. Stevens · Sandra Day O'Connor; Antonin Scalia · Anthony Kennedy

Case opinion
- Majority: Blackmun, joined by unanimous

Commissioner v. Indianapolis Power & Light Company, 493 U.S. 203 (1990), was a United States Supreme Court case in which the Court addressed whether customer deposits constituted taxable income to a public utility company.

== Background ==
Indianapolis Power & Light Company (IPL) required customers with suspect credit to make deposits with it to assure payment of future bills for electric service. IPL paid interest on deposits held for a certain period of time. A customer could obtain a refund prior to termination of service by making on time payments or by demonstrating acceptable credit. The refunds were normally made in cash or by check but a customer could also choose to have the deposit amount applied against future bills. Any deposit unclaimed after seven years would escheat to the State. At the time of receipt, IPL did not treat the deposits as income for tax purposes. The Internal Revenue Service (IRS) audited the utility and assessed a tax deficiency. IPL appealed this assessment to the United States Tax Court, which sided with IPL. This decision was then appealed, eventually reaching the Supreme Court.

== Analysis ==
In front of the Supreme Court, the IRS argued that the deposits were advance payments for electricity and therefore taxable to IPL in the year of receipt. In response, the utility stressed its obligation to refund the deposits with interest. IPL argued the payments were not taxable income because they were similar to loans.

To determine whether the deposits were income, the Supreme Court noted that “undeniable accessions to wealth, clearly realized, and over which the taxpayers have complete dominion” constitute income, citing Commissioner v. Glenshaw Glass Co. The Court found that IPL did not enjoy “complete dominion” over the customer deposits; rather, the IPL had an express obligation to repay a deposit when a customer established good credit or terminated service. IPL's right to keep the money thus depended upon the customer's subsequent decision to have the deposit applied to future bills, not merely upon the utility's adherence to its contractual duties. As such IPL's dominion over the funds was far less than is ordinarily present in an advance payment situation.

The Court, in a unanimous decision, held that whether a payment constitutes income when received depends upon the rights and obligations of the parties at the time the payments are made. The ability to choose what happens to the deposit distinguishes a loan from an advance payment. An individual who makes an advance payment retains no right to insist upon the return of the funds. In contrast, the IPL utility customers retained the right to repayment. While a customer might apply the money to the purchase of electricity, customers assume no obligation to do so. Because the utility did not acquire unfettered “dominion” over the money, the deposits did not constitute income for tax purposes at the time of receipt.

== Importance ==
This case highlights an ambiguous area in the U.S. tax code's treatment of deposits. The code treats advance payments and loans differently. Generally, the full amount of an advance payment for services is taxable income to the recipient in the year received. This is true even if the services extend beyond the taxable year. However, a loan is not gross income to the recipient. As the Court noted in this case, the rights of the contracting parties at the time of the payment determine if a deposit is an advance payment or a loan.

== See also ==
- List of United States Supreme Court cases, volume 493
- List of United States Supreme Court cases
- Lists of United States Supreme Court cases by volume
- List of United States Supreme Court cases by the Rehnquist Court
- Taxation in the United States
