= Leslee Unruh =

American anti-abortion advocate

- Years active: 1984–present
- Known for: Anti-abortion advocacy
- Spouse: Allen Unruh

Leslee Unruh is an American anti-abortion advocate and public speaker. Since 1983, she has been active in the anti-abortion movement and abstinence-until-marriage movement, with organizations based in South Dakota. She has been vocal in state and national government, previously serving as executive director to the "VoteYesForLife" campaign.

== Organizations ==
=== Omega Maternity Home ===
In 1983, Leslee Unruh founded the Omega Maternity Home in Sioux Falls, SD. Omega Maternity Home provided a “home environment that encourages these young women to set goals for their lives and learn to become independent” as well as giving “the tools to survive and develop so they will not need to rely on welfare programs.” A licensed social worker was on staff, available to provide counseling and aftercare programs for the women. The maternity home was run on private donations. Omega Maternity Home was open until 1994.

=== National Abstinence Clearinghouse ===
In 1996, she founded the National Abstinence Clearinghouse, a non-profit based in Sioux Falls, SD. The Clearinghouse serves as a resource center, providing information on abstinence until marriage programs. The organization grew rapidly after a federal government grant of $50 million for abstinence programs split between organizations. Its first conference was organized in 1998 in Minneapolis, MN. Unruh has talked about the activities of the National Abstinence Clearinghouse on The Oprah Winfrey Show and PBS.

=== Alpha Center ===
The Alpha Center is a pregnancy help center in Sioux Falls that provides pregnancy testing, STD testing, ultrasounds, and counselling for pregnant women.

== Politics ==
In March 2006, Unruh was a key lobbyist supporting the Women's Health and Human Life Protection Act in South Dakota, which banned abortion in almost any circumstances, including those where the pregnancy threatened the woman's health and life. Eight months later it was overturned by South Dakota's voters in a referendum. An amended version of the bill, with exceptions for rape, incest, and maternal health, was scheduled for a new vote in 2008. The amended was seen by all sides as the vehicle for a potential challenge to Roe v. Wade in the Supreme Court.

Unruh's "informed consent" law requires South Dakota doctors to tell patients that abortion can cause depression and sterility, among other side-effects. Initially found to be unconstitutional, this law resurfaced in June 2008 when the Eighth Circuit Court of Appeals overturned. A lower court's ruling blocked enforcement of the law; as of 2009, the case was back in district court. Unruh's activism garnered South Dakota $200 million in federal funding to be spent teaching abstinence outside of marriage to public school students.

Unruh is a prominent donor to Republican candidates.

== Views ==
Unruh does not support contraception. Unruh has spoken in favor of purity balls.

== Recognition ==
For her efforts in South Dakota, Unruh was awarded the 2006 Malachi Award by Operation Save America, a Christian organization.
