= Jeffrey Haverly =

American politician

Member of the South Dakota Senate from the 35th district
- In office January 13, 2009 – January 8, 2013
- Preceded by: William Napoli
- Succeeded by: Mark Kirkeby

Member of the South Dakota House of Representatives from the 35th district
- In office January 14, 2003 – January 13, 2009
- Preceded by: William Napoli
- Succeeded by: Don Kopp

Personal details
- Born: November 19, 1958 (age 67) La Crosse, Wisconsin
- Party: Republican

Jeffrey Haverly (born November 19, 1958) is an American politician who served in the South Dakota House of Representatives from the 35th district from 2003 to 2009 and in the South Dakota Senate from the 35th district from 2009 to 2013.
