= 1998 Esso Longford fire =

1998 industrial disaster in Victoria, Australia

- A view of the Longford plant, September 2002

- 1998 Esso Longford fire (Victoria)
- Date: 25 September 1998
- Time: 12:26 pm (AEST)
- Duration: 20 days until normal gas supply resumed
- Venue: Esso Australia Resources Ltd. Longford Gas Plant 1 (GP1)
- Location: Longford, Victoria, Australia; 38.224°S 147.167°E
- Type: Jet fire and conflagration
- Cause: Low temperature embrittlement and thermal stress of a heat exchanger
- Outcome: Fires lasting more than two days; Gas supplies to Victoria resumed on 14 October 1998
- Deaths: 2
- Injuries: 8
- Property damage: US$443 million (US$987 million in 2021)
- Inquiries: By royal commission, 12 November 1998 – 15 April 1999
- Coroner: Graeme Johnstone

On 25 September 1998, a catastrophic fire occurred at the Esso natural gas plant in Longford, Victoria, Australia. A pressure vessel ruptured resulting in a serious jet fire, which escalated to a conflagration extending to a large part of the plant. Fires lasted two days before they were finally extinguished.

Two workers were killed and eight others injured. Natural gas supply to the state of Victoria was severely disrupted and was not fully restored until 14 October. Total estimated property costs amounted to US$443 million (US$987 million in 2021), while financial losses to the companies affected by the gas shortage were estimated at around A$1.3 billion.

The Victorian state government established the Longford Royal Commission to publicly investigate the causes of the accident.

== Context ==
In 1998, the Longford gas plant was owned by a joint partnership between Esso and BHP. Esso was responsible for the operation of the plant. Esso was a wholly owned subsidiary of US-based company Exxon, which has since merged with Mobil, becoming ExxonMobil.

Built in 1969, the plant at Longford is the onshore receiving point for raw natural gas output from the Marlin, Barracouta and Snapper fields in the Bass Strait, as well as crude oil from further offshore oil platforms. The plant complex consisted of three gas processing plants (Gas Plants 1, 2 and 3 or GP1, GP2 and GP3) and one crude oil stabilisation plant (CSP). It was the primary provider of natural gas to Victoria and provided some supply to New South Wales.

The gas feed from the Bass Strait consisted of liquid and gaseous raw natural gas, containing methane, ethane, propane and butane, together with water vapours and hydrogen sulfide (H_{2}S). In order to produce natural gas of commercial specifications, it was necessary to separate nearly all non-methane content. Water and hydrogen sulfide were first removed from the gas. The resulting stream still contained both liquid condensate and gaseous components.

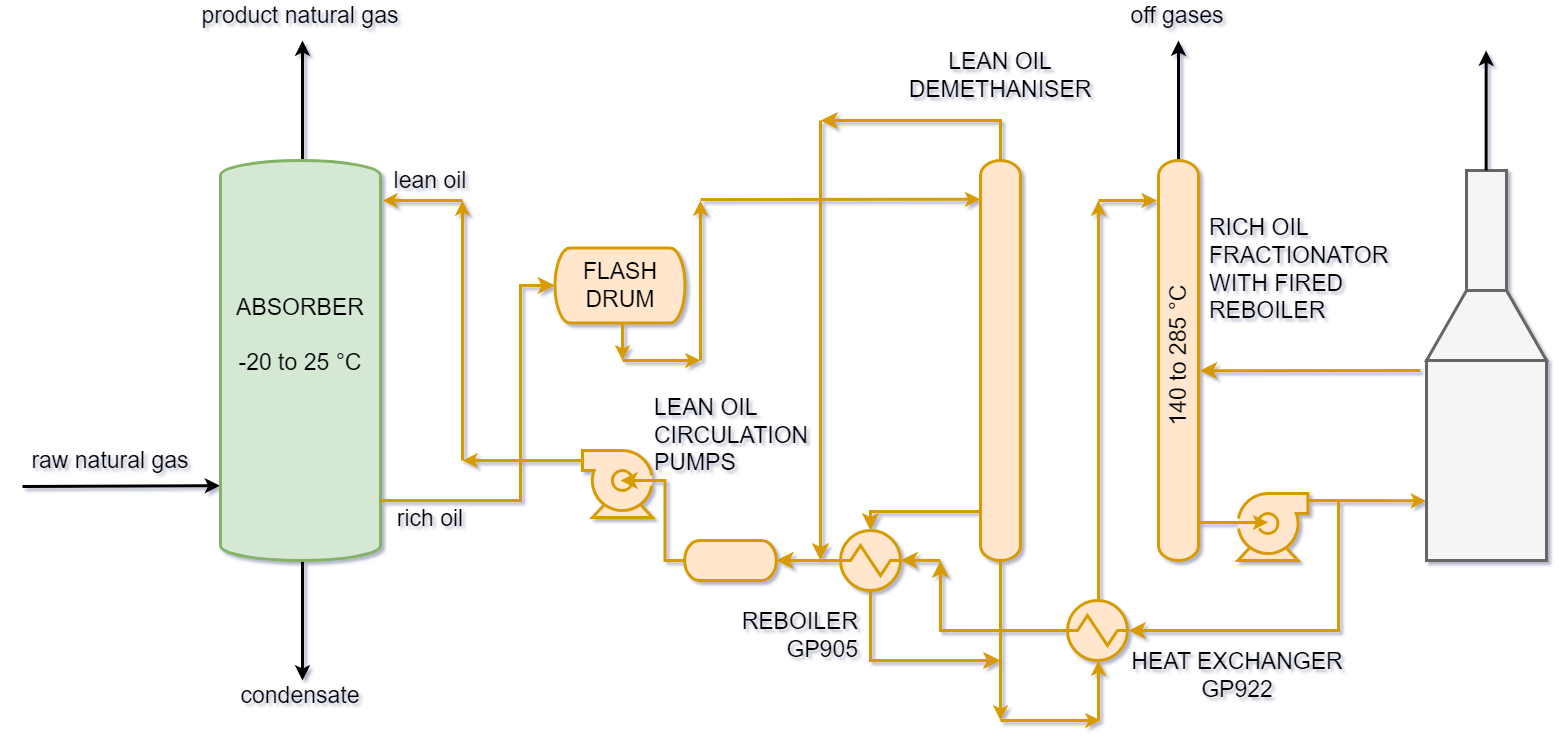
Process schematic of Gas Plant 1 (for simplicity's sake only one absorber is shown)

Gas Plant 1 was a lean-oil absorption plant separating methane from liquefied petroleum gas (LPG) by stripping the gas using a liquid hydrocarbon stream called "lean oil" (a light oil similar to aviation kerosene). This occurred in two absorbers (working in a parallel configuration), large vertical pressure vessels in which chilled raw natural gas rose up from the bottom, on its way up shed heavier components (ethane, propane and butane) against the falling stream of lean oil and finally left the vessel at the top as methane. Lean oil, on the other hand, absorbed heavy gas components on its way down and thereby left the absorber having become "rich oil". Most of the heavier gas components left at the bottom of the absorbers in the form of LPG.

Coupled with the absorbers was a system of columns, pumps and heat exchangers used to regenerate the lean oil from the rich oil stream by separating from it heavier gas components the oil had stripped from the natural gas in the absorbers.

Gas Plants 2 and 3, which were built in 1976 and 1983 respectively, used cryogenic technology, rather than absorption, to produce commercial-grade natural gas. At the time of the accident, Longford was able to process in excess of 530 MMscfd of sales gas, 37,700 barrels per day of LPG, and 188,500 barrels per day of crude oil.

== Fire ==
There were several precursors to the breach of containment that precipitated the fire. Post-event analysis was difficult due to the complex interconnections and interactions between different plant streams. That complexity probably made the diagnosis of the plant upset very challenging for the operators and may have contributed to the accident.

During the morning of Friday 25 September 1998, (Note: It was a particularly cold period in the state of Victoria. It was also a school holiday, when several technical staff members were not on duty. The shift leader that day was a maintenance supervisor with limited experience with facility operations.) a pump supplying heated lean oil to shell-and-tube heat exchanger, GP905, in Gas Plant 1 tripped. That was likely due to a high level of liquid in one of the process drums, which in turn was caused by excess liquid overflowing from the demethaniser column. That chain of events was probably initiated by an increase in flow from the Marlin gas field.

A heat exchanger is a vessel that allows the transfer of heat from a hot stream to a cold one. It does not operate at a single temperature, but experiences a range of temperatures throughout the vessel. Temperatures through GP905 normally ranged from 60 to 230 °C (140 to 446 °F). Due to the stoppage in the flow of the heating medium and the continued inflow of cold process fluid on the shell side of the exchanger, parts of GP905 experienced temperatures as low as −48 °C (−54 °F). Ice from condensed atmospheric humidity formed on the unit shell. The same occurred elsewhere in the plant (for example on heat exchanger GP922), where cryogenic fluid was present which, under normal circumstances, would have been hot. A decision was taken to shut down the entire Gas Plant 1.

Once the faulty pump was restarted, hot lean oil was pumped into the heat exchanger at 230 °C (446 °F). At 12:26 pm the steel of the exchanger outer shell, embrittled due to exposure to temperatures far below its safe design envelope, gave way due to thermal stress.

About 10 tonnes of hydrocarbon were immediately vented from the rupture and flashed. A vapour cloud formed and drifted downwind. It ignited 60–90 seconds later, when it reached a set of fired heaters 170 m (560 ft) away. That caused a deflagration which quickly burnt its way back to the leak source. When the flame front reached the rupture in the heat exchanger, a fierce jet fire developed. However, there was no blast wave and the nearby control room was undamaged. (Note: The effect was termed an explosion by the media. However, the commission stated: "While the term 'explosion' has been used to characterise the ignition of the initial vapour cloud, the appropriate technical term to describe this ignition is a 'flash fire' or 'deflagration'.") The plant supervisor and a maintenance supervisor were killed in the initial fire.

The jet fire burnt beneath a critical pipe rack section, colloquially known to the operators as "King's Cross". In a case of domino effect accident, over a 30-minute period, from 13:00 to 13:32, impinging flames led to three other releases of large flammable inventories. A full-blown plant conflagration ensued.

== Aftermath ==
Complete isolation of the pipes feeding the fire required nearly two and a half days, because of the interconnections between the three gas plants. Consequently, it was not possible to extinguish the fire until 17:30 on 27 September. Many Country Fire Authority brigades were involved in fire-fighting operations. Gas production, however, had been shut down immediately, and the state of Victoria was left without its primary gas supplier. Within days, VENCorp shut down the state's entire gas supply.

The resulting gas supply shortage was devastating to Victoria's economy, crippling industry and the commercial sector. 1.4 million households and 89,000 businesses were affected. The hospitality industry, which relied on natural gas for cooking, was heavily affected. Loss to industry during the crisis was estimated at around A$1.3 billion. Because natural gas was widely used in Victorian houses for cooking, water heating and home heating, many Victorians endured 20 days without those facilities.

Gas supplies to Victoria resumed on 14 October. Many Victorians were outraged and upset to discover only minor compensation included in their next gas bill, with the average compensation figure being only around $10.

=== Longford Royal Commission ===
A royal commission was called on 12 October 1998, headed by former High Court judge Daryl Dawson. It was the first royal commission into an industrial accident in the state of Victoria since the collapse of the West Gate Bridge in Melbourne in 1970. The Longford Royal Commission sat for 53 days, commencing with a preliminary hearing on 12 November 1998 and concluding with a closing address by Counsel Assisting the Royal Commission on 15 April 1999.

Esso blamed the accident on plant operators' negligence, even producing the training records of one particular operator in an attempt to show he should have known how to manage the plant upset. The findings of the Longford Royal Commission, however, focused on Esso's safety practices rather than the actions of individual operators:

The causes of the accident on 25 September 1998 amounted to a failure to provide and maintain so far as practicable a working environment that was safe and without risks to health. This constituted a breach or breaches of section 21 of the [Victorian] Occupational Health and Safety Act 1985.

=== In process safety ===
The Longford Royal Commission's findings became key lessons in the area of process safety. Andrew Hopkins, who was an expert witness at the royal commission, based his 2000 book on Lessons from Longford on the results of the commission. Points of interest and lessons learned from Longford include aspects such as:

- Design of the plant, in particular in relation to isolation of hazardous inventories, an aspect that exacerbated the fire escalation.
- Training of personnel and operating procedures, which were inadequate for dealing with a hazardous process, especially in regards to significant plant upsets, such as the loss of lean oil circulation.
- Excessive alarm and warning systems, which caused workers to become desensitised to possible hazardous occurrences.
- Poor communication between shifts, which meant that the pump shut-down was not properly communicated to the following shift. (Note: Poor shift handover was also a major contributor to the disasters of Piper Alpha, Texas City and Buncefield.)

Certain managerial shortcomings were also identified:

- The company had neglected to commission a hazard and operability analysis (HAZOP) of the system affected, which would almost certainly have highlighted the risk of tank rupture caused by sudden temperature change.
- Esso's two-tiered reporting system (from operators to supervisors to management) meant that certain warning signs, such as a previous similar incident on 28 August, were not reported to the appropriate parties.
- The relocation of plant engineers to Melbourne had reduced the quality of supervision at the plant.

It has been argued that Esso's safety culture was too focused on lost-time incidents of an eminently occupational safety nature and was less concerned about safe plant maintenance and operations, an attitude that may ultimately have led to the major fire. The relocation of key engineers to the Melbourne office without a proper risk assessment has been indicated as a failure to carry out proper organisational change management, a fundamental element of process safety management.

Another aspect that may have warranted a formal change management process was the increase in heavy gas components in the feed from the offshore gas fields. While it is normal for fields such as those feeding the Longford gas plants to yield heavier gas in later life-cycle phases, the creeping change should have been nonetheless assessed, and procedural or design provisions put in place accordingly. Instead, plant operators were obliged to manage the increase in condensate liquids reactively, working with what facilities they already had available. Other elements of process safety management that failed at Longford included leadership and culture, process safety information, hazard identification and risk analysis, operating procedures, training, incident investigation, and emergency preparedness, despite the Esso "Operations Integrity Management System" nominally meeting process safety management requirements.

== Legal ramifications ==
Esso was taken to the Supreme Court of Victoria by the Victorian WorkCover Authority. The jury found the company guilty of eleven breaches of the Occupational Health and Safety Act 1985, and Justice Philip Cummins imposed a record fine of A$2 million in July 2001.

In addition, a class action was initiated on behalf of businesses, industries and domestic users who were financially affected by the gas crisis. The class action went to trial in the Supreme Court on 4 September 2002, and was eventually settled in December 2004 with Esso being ordered to pay A$32 million to businesses which suffered property damage as a result of the incident.

Following the Longford accident, Victoria introduced the Major Hazard Facilities Regulations to govern safety at plants that present major process hazards (revoked in 2007). The regulations imposed a non-prescriptive regime on facility operators, requiring them to demonstrate control of major hazards via the use of a safety management system and a safety case. As a result, by 30 June 2002 about fifty major-hazard facilities had to develop and submit a safety case to the regulator WorkSafe, a division of the Victorian Workcover Authority. Other Australian states have also implemented similar regulatory regimes.

== See also ==
- 1989 Phillips disaster
- 2005 Texas City refinery explosion
- 2009 Cataño oil refinery fire
