= Phillips disaster of 1989 =

1989 flammable gas explosion accident in Pasadena, Texas, US

On 23 October 1989 at approximately 1:05 PM Central Daylight Time, a series of explosions occurred at Phillips Petroleum Company's Houston Chemical Complex (HCC) in Pasadena, Texas, near the Houston Ship Channel. The initial blast registered 3.5 on the Richter scale, and the resulting fires took 10 hours to bring under control, as efforts to battle the fire were hindered because the blast damaged water pipes for the fire hydrants. The initial explosion was found to have resulted from a release of extremely flammable process gasses used to produce high-density polyethylene, a plastic used for various consumer food container products. The US Occupational Safety and Health Administration fined Phillips Petroleum Company $5,666,200 and fined Fish Engineering and Construction, Inc., the maintenance contractor, $729,600. The event killed 23 employees and injured 314.

== Prior to the disaster ==
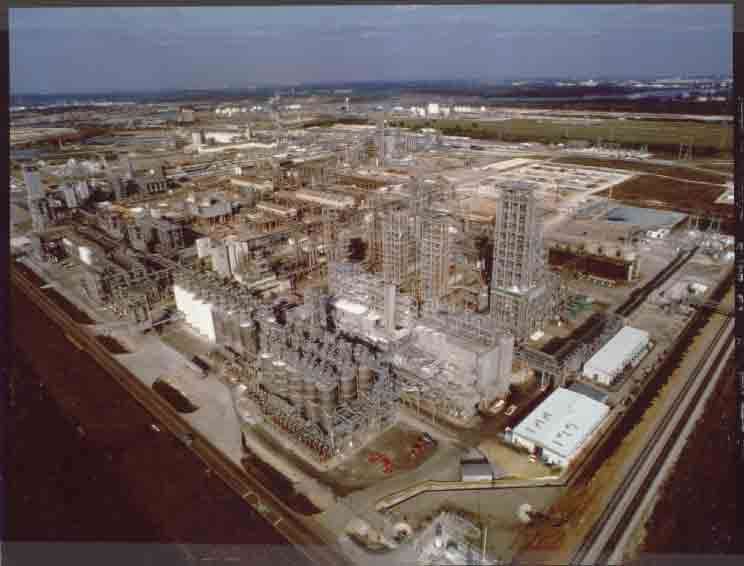
Aerial view of the Phillips plant prior to the explosion, looking from the southwest to the northeast

The HCC produced approximately 1.5×10^{9} lb (0.68×10^{6} t) per year of high-density polyethylene (HDPE), a plastic material used to make milk bottles and other containers. Approximately 1500 people worked at the facility, including 905 company employees and approximately 600 daily contract employees, who were engaged primarily in regular maintenance activities and new plant construction.

== Cause ==
The accident resulted from a release of extremely flammable process gases that occurred during regular maintenance operations on one of the plant's polyethylene reactors. More than 85,000 lb (39 t) of highly flammable gases were released through an open valve almost instantaneously.

During routine maintenance, isolation valves were closed and compressed air hoses that actuated them physically disconnected as a safety measure. The air connections for opening and closing this valve were identical, and had been improperly reversed when last re-connected. As a result, the valve would have been open while the switch in the control room was in the "valve closed" position. After that, the valve was opened when it was expected to stay closed, and finally passed the reactor content into air. A vapor cloud formed and travelled rapidly through the polyethylene plant. Within 90 to 120 seconds, the vapor cloud came into contact with an ignition source and exploded with the force of 2.4 tons of TNT. Ten to fifteen minutes later, that was followed by the explosion of the 20,000 U.S. gal (76,000 L) isobutane storage tank, then by the catastrophic failure of another polyethylene reactor, and finally by other explosions, probably about six in total.

== Explosions ==
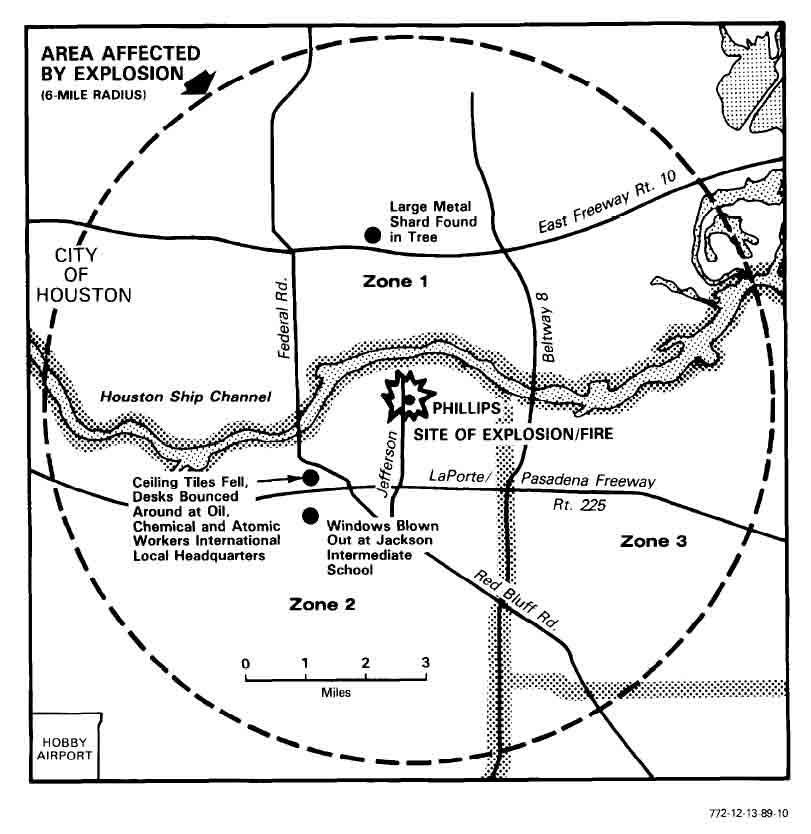
Map of area affected by the explosion

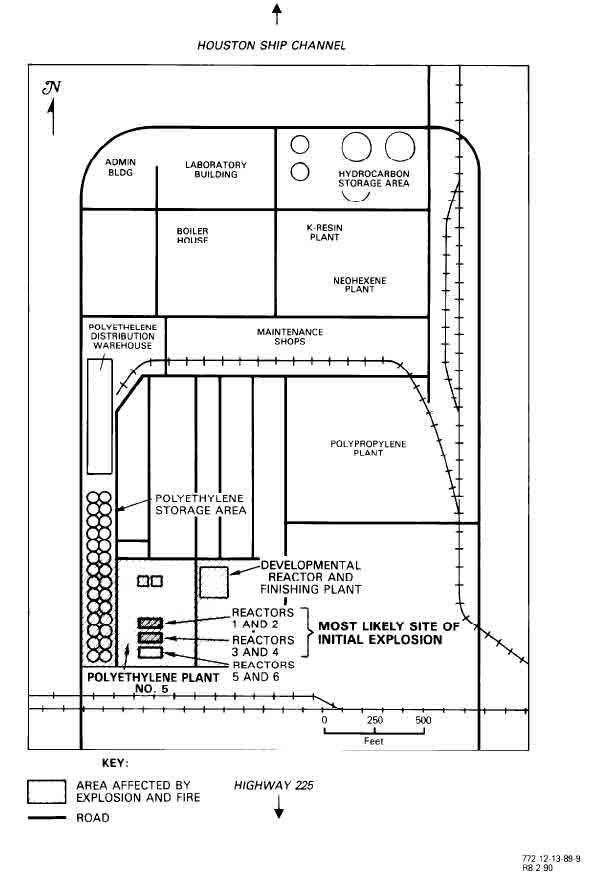
Site plan

The incident started at approximately 1:05 PM local time on October 23, 1989, at 1400 Jefferson Road, Pasadena, Texas. A powerful and devastating explosion and fire ripped through the HCC, killing 23 people—all working at the facility—and injuring 314 others (185 Phillips Petroleum Company employees and 129 contract employees). In addition to the loss of life and injuries, the explosion affected all facilities within the complex, causing $715.5 million worth of damage plus an additional business disruption loss estimated at $700 million. The two polyethylene production plants nearest the source of the blast were destroyed, and in the HCC administration building nearly 0.5 mile away, windows were shattered and bricks ripped out. The initial explosion was equivalent to an earthquake registering 3.5 on the Richter scale and threw debris as far away as six miles.

== Early response ==
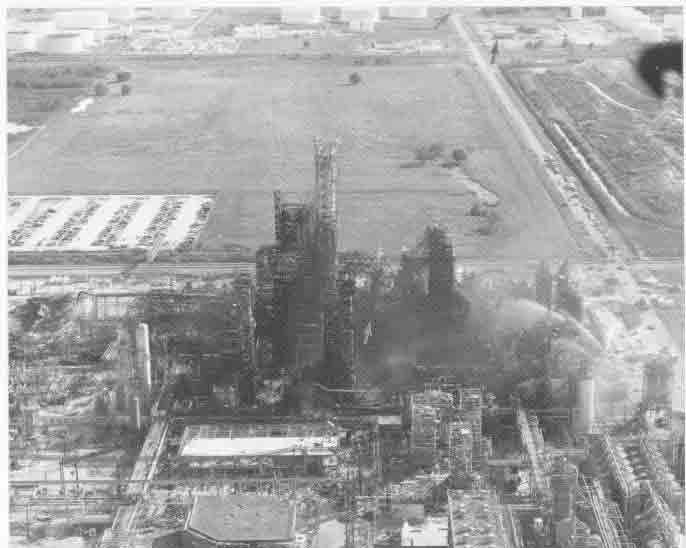
Aerial photo of complex as seen from north to south.

The initial response was provided by the Phillips Petroleum Company fire brigade which was soon joined by members of the Channel Industries Mutual Aid association (CIMA). Cooperating governmental agencies were the Texas Air Control Board, the Harris County Pollution Control Board, the Federal Aviation Administration (FAA), the U.S. Coast Guard, the Occupational Safety and Health Administration (OSHA) and the U.S. Environmental Protection Agency (EPA).

== Firefighting ==
The firefighting water system at the HCC was part of the process water system. When the first explosion occurred, some fire hydrants were sheared off at ground level by the blast. The result was inadequate water pressure for firefighting. The shut-off valves which could have been used to prevent the loss of water from ruptured lines in the plant were out of reach in the burning wreckage. No remotely operated fail-safe isolation valves existed in the combined plant/firefighting water system. In addition, the regular-service fire-water pumps were disabled by the fire which destroyed their electrical power cables. Of the three backup diesel-operated fire pumps, one had been taken out of service, and one ran out of fuel in about an hour. Firefighting water was brought in by hoses laid to remote sources: settling ponds, a cooling tower, a water main at a neighboring plant, and even the Houston Ship Channel. The fire was brought under control within about 10 hours as a result of the combined efforts of fire brigades from other nearby companies, local fire departments, and the Phillips Petroleum Company foam trucks and fire brigade.

== Search and rescue ==
Search and rescue efforts were delayed until the fire and heat subsided and all danger of further explosions had passed. These operations were difficult because of the extensive devastation in the HCC and the danger of structural collapse. The Phillips Petroleum Company requested, and the FAA approved and implemented, a one-mile no-fly zone around the plant to prevent engine vibration and/or helicopter rotor downwash from dislodging any of the wreckage. The U.S. Coast Guard and Port of Houston fire boats evacuated to safety over 100 trapped people across the Houston Ship Channel. OSHA preserved evidence for evaluation regarding the cause of the catastrophe.

== List of casualties ==
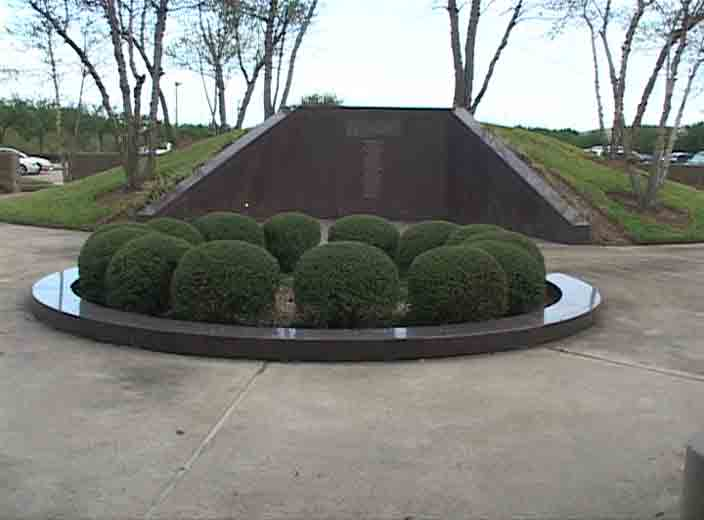
Granite memorial (far) at 924 Jefferson Rd., Pasadena, Texas.

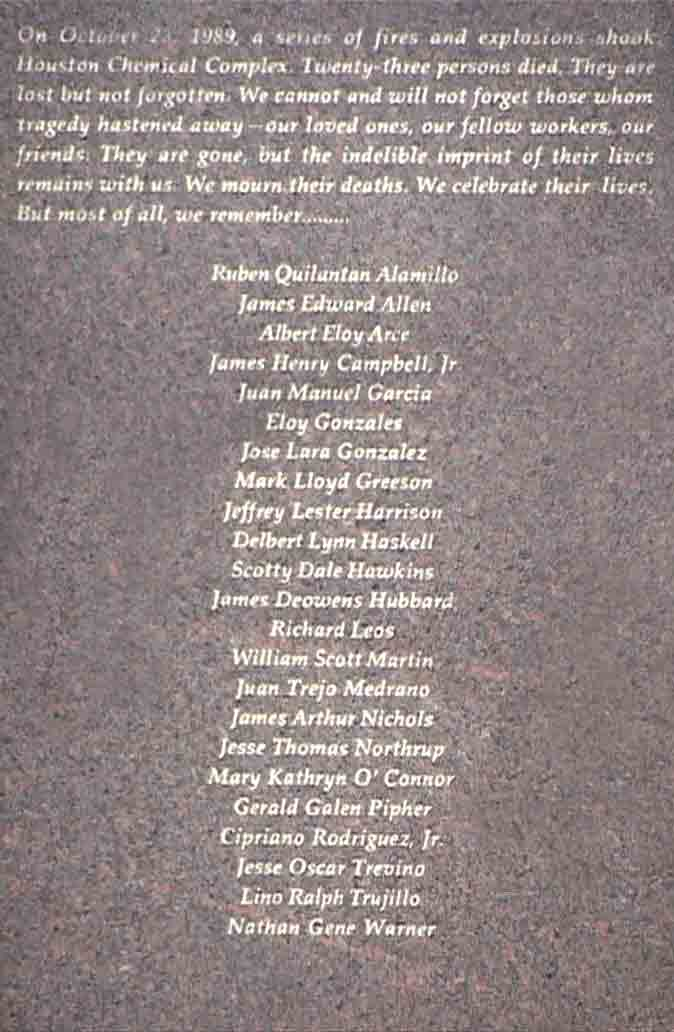
Granite memorial (close-up). A few of the names differ slightly from the official death records shown at left.

=== Phillips Petroleum Company employees ===
Fatally wounded, listed by name, age, city of residence within Texas, and official date of death (following recovery and identification of remains or eventual death from injuries)

- Stephen Donald Huff, 21, 25 October 1989
- Ruben Quilantan Alamillo, 35, Houston, 25 October 1989
- James Edward Allen, 38, Pasadena, 2 November 1989
- Albert Eloy Arce, 34, Deer Park, 7 November 1989 (listed as Eloy Albert Arce)
- James Henry Campbell Jr., 30, Baytown, 26 October 1989
- Eloy Gonzales, 36, Houston, 1 November 1989
- Mark Lloyd Greeson, 30, Pasadena, 28 October 1989
- Delbert Lynn Haskell, 43, Deer Park, 29 October 1989
- Scotty Dale Hawkins, 32, Houston, 28 October 1989
- James Deowens Hubbard, 45, Houston, 25 October 1989 (listed as James Hubbard Jr.)
- Richard Leos, 30, La Porte, 29 October 1989
- James Arthur Nichols, 40, Baytown, 27 October 1989
- Jesse Thomas Northrup, 43, Brookshire, 28 October 1989
- Mary Kathryn O'Connor, 34, Houston, 29 October 1989
- Gerald Galen Pipher, 39, Deer Park, 30 October 1989
- Cipriano Rodriguez Jr., 42, Pasadena, 27 October 1989
- Jesse Oscar Trevino, 33, Pearland, 30 October 1989
- Lino Ralph Trujillo, 39, Pasadena, 29 October 1989
- Nathan Gene Warner, 30, Deer Park, 24 October 1989
- Phillipe Wilf Greene, 47, Alnwick, 30 October 1989
- Cedric Wilf Greene, 35, Alnwick, 29 October 1989

=== Fish Engineering employees ===
Fatally wounded and official dates of death

- Juan Manuel Garcia, 30 October 1989
- Jose Lara Gonzalez, 23 October 1989
- William Scott Martin, 25 October 1989
- John Medrano, 30 October 1989 (listed as Juan Trejo-Medrano)

A granite memorial at 29°43′59.2″N 95°10′57.1″W near 924 Jefferson Road, Pasadena, Texas was dedicated on the first anniversary of the disaster, and was declared by company officials to be open to the general public at all times.

== OSHA findings ==
OSHA's major findings included:

- Lack of process hazard analysis
- Inadequate standard operating procedures (SOPs)
- Non-fail-safe block valve
- Inadequate maintenance permitting system
- Inadequate lockout/tagout procedures
- Lack of combustible gas detection and alarm system
- Presence of ignition sources
- Inadequate ventilation systems for nearby buildings
- Fire protection system not maintained in an adequate state of readiness.

Additional factors found by OSHA included:

- Proximity of high-occupancy structures (control rooms) to hazardous operations
- Inadequate separation between buildings
- Crowded process equipment
- Insufficient separation between the reactors and the control room for emergency shutdown procedures.

Quoting from a key OSHA document:

"At the conclusion of the investigation (April 19, 1990), OSHA issued 566 willful and 9 serious violations with a combined total proposed penalty of $5,666,200 to Phillips Petroleum Company and 181 willful and 12 serious violations with a combined total proposed penalty of $729,600 to Fish Engineering and Construction, Inc., a maintenance contractor on the site."

== OSHA citations ==
As a result of a settlement between OSHA and Phillips Petroleum Company, OSHA agreed to delete the willful characterization of the citations and Phillips Petroleum Company agreed to pay a $4 million fine and to institute process safety management procedures at HCC and the company's sister facilities at Sweeny, Texas; Borger, Texas; and Woods Cross, Utah.

== Facility today ==
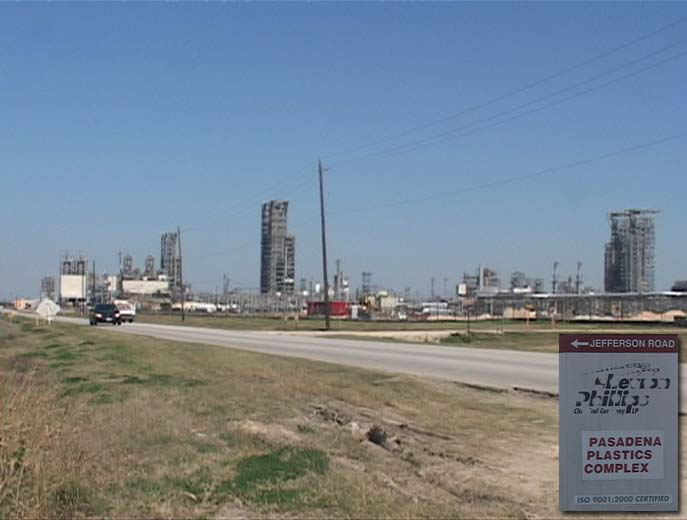
Site of Phillips explosions of 1989, 1999 and 2000 (as photographed in 2008).

Today, the facility continues to manufacture polyethylene. This complex employs 450 workers for the production of speciality chemicals, including 150 operations and maintenance personnel.

The facility experienced additional fatalities in 1999 and 2000.

== See also ==
- 1990 ARCO explosion
- Chevron Phillips
- List of industrial disasters
