= (R)-citramalate synthase =

Class of enzymes

Identifiers
- EC no.: 2.3.3.21

Databases
- IntEnz: IntEnz view
- BRENDA: BRENDA entry
- ExPASy: NiceZyme view
- KEGG: KEGG entry
- MetaCyc: metabolic pathway
- PRIAM: profile
- PDB structures: RCSB PDB PDBe PDBsum
Search
- PMC: articles
- PubMed: articles
- NCBI: proteins

(R)-citramalate synthase (EC 2.3.3.21, CimA) is an enzyme. This enzyme catalyses the following chemical reaction

acetyl-CoA + pyruvate + H_{2}O $\rightleftharpoons$ CoA + (2R)-2-hydroxy-2-methylbutanedioate

This enzyme participates in a novel pyruvate pathway for isoleucine biosynthesis.
