= Willful violation =

Deliberate or negligent violation of workplace rules and policies

In the North Americanlegal system and in US Occupational Safety and Health Administration regulations, willful violation or willful non-compliance is a violation of workplace rules and policies that occurs either deliberately or as a result of neglect.

== Definition ==
Willful violation is defined as an "act done voluntarily with either an intentional disregard of, or plain indifference to," the requirements of Acts, regulations, statutes or relevant workplace policies. This is described with slightly different emphasis in an OSHA technical manual that a "willful violation exists under the Act where the evidence shows either an intentional violation of the Act or plain indifference to its requirements."

Criminal recklessness is similarly described in Black's Law Dictionary as "Conduct whereby the actor does not desire harmful consequence but...foresees the possibility and consciously takes the risk," or alternatively as "a state of mind in which a person does not care about the consequences of his or her actions."

== See also ==
- Actus reus – In criminal law, the "guilty act" ("guilty act")
- Automatism (law) – Legal defence; the criminal was unaware of their actions during the crime
- Breach of duty in English law
- Calculus of negligence – Process for identifying breach of duty of care
- Carelessness (criminal) – Lack of awareness during a behaviour that can result in unintentional consequences
- Contravention – Lesser offense in civil law
- Culpability – Degree to which one is morally or legally responsible for a crime
- Criminal negligence – State of mind needed to constitute a conventional criminal offense
- Depraved-heart murder – Killing where the circumstances demonstrate a "depraved indifference" to human life
- Duty of care – Type of legal obligation
- Duty to rescue – Concept in tort law and criminal law
- Endangerment – Crime likely to produce death or injury
- English tort law – Branch of English law concerning civil wrongs
- Excuse – Concept in criminal jurisprudence
- Good Samaritan law – Legal protection for rescuers
- Health and safety law – Field concerned with the safety, health and welfare of people at work
- Imputation (law) – Principle that all laws are published, so ignorance is not an excuse
- Infraction – Crime tried without a jury
- Intention (criminal law) – State of mind which must accompany some crimes to make them illegal
- Mens rea – In criminal law, the "guilty mind" ("guilty mind")
- Negligence – Failure to exercise reasonable care
- Omission (law) – Failure to act
- Plausible deniability – Ability to deny responsibility
- Punitive damages – Damages assessed in order to punish the defendant for outrageous conduct
- Reasonable person – Hypothetical person of legal fiction
- Recklessness (law) – Intentionally disregarding risks of an act
- Regulatory offence – Crime for which mens rea is not required to prove culpability
- Rescue doctrine
- Tort law – Legal claim of civil wrong
- Treble damages – Right of a court to triple the amount of the actual/compensatory damages awarded
- Willful blindness – Strategy for attempting to avoid liability (also called "willful ignorance" or "contrived ignorance")
