= Haverly v. United States =

- Court: United States Court of Appeals for the Seventh Circuit
- Full case name: Charles N. Haverly and Ruth L. Haverly v. United States of America
- Argued: January 10, 1975
- Decided: March 20, 1975
- Citations: 513 F.2d 224; 75-1 USTC (CCH) ¶ 9326

Case history
- Subsequent history: Rehearing en banc denied, May 5, 1975

Holding
- The taxpayer (a public elementary school principal) had to include in gross income the value of unsolicited sample textbooks, sent to him by publishers, when he subsequently donated them to the school's library and claimed a charitable deduction.

Court membership
- Judges sitting: John Simpson Hastings, Luther Merritt Swygert, Walter J. Cummings Jr.

Case opinions
- Majority: Hastings, joined by a unanimous court

Laws applied
- Internal Revenue Code

Haverly v. United States, 513 F.2d 224 (7th Cir. 1975) is a United States income tax case.

Held:

- The taxpayer (a public elementary school principal) had to include in gross income the value of unsolicited sample textbooks, sent to him by publishers, when he subsequently donated them to the school's library and claimed a charitable deduction. I.R.C.1954 §§ 61, 170.

== Case brief ==
=== Facts ===
During the years 1967 and 1968 Charles N. Haverly was the principal of the Alice L. Barnard Elementary School in Chicago, Illinois. In each of these years publishers sent to the taxpayer unsolicited sample copies of textbooks which had a total fair market value at the time of receipt of $400. In 1968 Haverly donated the books to the Alice L. Barnard Elementary School Library. The parties agreed that the donation entitled the taxpayer to a charitable deduction under 26 U.S.C. § 170, in the amount of $400, the value of the books at the time of the contribution.

=== Issue ===
The issue in this case was "whether the value of unsolicited sample textbooks sent by publishers to a principal of a public elementary school, which he subsequently donated to the school's library and for which he claimed a charitable deduction, constitutes gross income to the principal within the meaning of Section 61 of the Internal Revenue Code of 1954, 26 U.S.C. § 61."

=== Holding ===
Haverly cannot take a charitable contribution deduction for donating books that he himself never purchased. The court cited Commissioner v. Glenshaw Glass Co. for the proposition that "Section 61(a) encompasses all 'accessions to wealth, clearly realized, and over which the taxpayers have complete dominion.'"

== Subsequent developments ==
Following this decision, Congress enacted Rev. Rule. 70-498, which prevents double dipping of both deducted and charitable donations.

== Academic commentary ==
It seems strange to permit a party to exclude a receipt and also deduct its value. Nevertheless, the court barred neither—but it accompanied the charitable deduction with income realization at an equal amount. Here are the reasons it chose this approach:

- the court had to permit exclusion in the first instance, because of hardship to lower-paid persons of paying cash for kind (even though gross income includes any accession to wealth, including unasked for samples)
- the court also had to permit the deduction because the code [absent today's §170(e)(1)] authorized a deduction for the full value of donated property (even though a charitable deduction should not exceed the taxpayer's basis)
