= Disappearance of Serenity Dennard =

2019 American missing person case

Serenity Dennard
- Dennard prior to her disappearance
- Born: May 12, 2009
- Disappeared: February 3, 2019 (aged 9); Rockerville, South Dakota, United States
- Status: Missing for 7 years, 9 months and 18 days
- Height: 4 ft 7 in (140 cm)

On February 3, 2019, Serenity June Dennard, a 9-year-old girl from Rockerville, South Dakota, United States, disappeared after leaving the Black Hills Children's Home Society on Rockerville Road. Just before 11:00 a.m., she walked out of the children's home and began walking up north on Rockerville Road without a coat in freezing temperatures. She was reported missing later that day, and possibly the largest missing-person search in South Dakota was carried out, but she was never seen again.

== Background ==
Serenity June Dennard was born on May 12, 2009. Prior to her disappearance, Dennard had been adopted, and her adoptive parents placed her in the Black Hills Children's Home in July 2018, for what was typically a 14-month admission.

== Disappearance ==
On February 3, 2019, before 11:00 a.m., Dennard walked out from the Black Hills Children's Home and north up Rockerville Road. About 25 minutes later, an eyewitness was dropping off a relative and noticed Dennard in front of the children's home, heading north on Rockerville Road, and this was the last time Dennard was ever seen alive.

Between 12:00 and 1:00 p.m., the staff placed a call to 911 to report Dennard missing. The Black Hills Children's Home had received significant protest, and staff were fired due to waiting over 80 minutes to call emergency services. Dennard was described as 4 ft 7 in (1.40 m) tall, had dark blonde hair, had blue eyes, and was wearing a long sleeved gray shirt with flowers, blue jeans, and black snow boots. The search began shortly after, and around four deputies were on site. The search was extremely intensive, with a total of over 1,000 volunteers covering over 4,500 mi (7,200 km) of woodlands. Search and rescue dogs picked up a scent near a creek, but Dennard's location was not found.

On January 28, 2021, after nearly two years of the exhaustive and intensive search, the search was officially suspended due to a lack of leads. It was deemed the most extensive missing-person search in South Dakota. Multiple agencies were assisted, including ground, water, and air support with K9 teams across the United States, having searched the area over 200 times.

In May 2023, the National Center for Missing & Exploited Children constructed age-progressed photographs of Dennard, depicting what she may look like at 14, with the hopes of generating new leads for the investigation.

== Theories ==
The disappearance of Dennard has encompassed a variety of theories, and these are the most common theories.

=== Kidnapping ===
A very common theory is that Dennard was kidnapped by an unknown individual. However, while no individual has been cleared in the case, investigators do not believe Dennard was kidnapped by a stranger or a neighbor, or that the facility played a role in the disappearance.

=== Hypothermia ===
A common theory is that Dennard died from hypothermia after walking out the facility. According to reports, Dennard did not wear a jacket when she walked out. Authorities have put together a theory that Dennard went into a remote section of the children's home, got lost, and could have led to hypothermia.
