= Don Kopp =

American politician

Member of the South Dakota House of Representatives from the 35th district
- Incumbent
- Assumed office January 2009 Serving with Mark Kirkeby (2009–2013); Blaine Campbell (2013–present)
- Preceded by: Jeffrey Haverly

Personal details
- Born: April 19, 1942 (age 84) Rock Springs, Wyoming
- Party: Republican

Donald D. Kopp (born April 19, 1942) is an American politician and a Republican member of the South Dakota House of Representatives representing District 35 since January 2009.

== Elections ==
- 2012 With incumbent Republican Representative Mark Kirkeby running for South Dakota Senate and leaving a District 35 seat open, Kopp ran in the three-way June 5, 2012 Republican Primary and placed first with 712 votes (48.3%); in the four-way November 6, 2012 General election, Kopp took the first seat with 4,305 votes (34.63%) and fellow Republican nominee Blaine Campbell took the second seat ahead of Democratic nominees Shane Liebig (who had run for Senate in 2008) and Jay Pond (who had run for the seat in 2010 as an Independent).
- 2008 When District 35 incumbent Republican Representative Jeffrey Haverly ran for South Dakota Senate and left a District 35 seat open, Kopp ran in the three-way June 3, 2008 Republican Primary and placed second with 655 votes (38.5%); in the four-way November 4, 2008 General election incumbent Republican Representative Mark Kirkeby took the first seat and Kopp took the second seat with 3,893 votes (28.23%) ahead of Democratic nominees Fern Johnson and Curtis Marquardt.
- 2010 Kopp and incumbent Representative Kirkeby were unopposed for the June 8, 2010 Republican Primary and won the four-way November 2, 2010 General election, where Representative Kirkeby took the first seat and Kopp took the second seat with 2,871 votes (28.07%) ahead of Democratic nominee Sharon Green and Independent candidate Jay Pond.
