= 2000 Phillips explosion =

Chemical plant explosion in Houston, Texas

Coordinates: 29.7318°N 95.1807°W

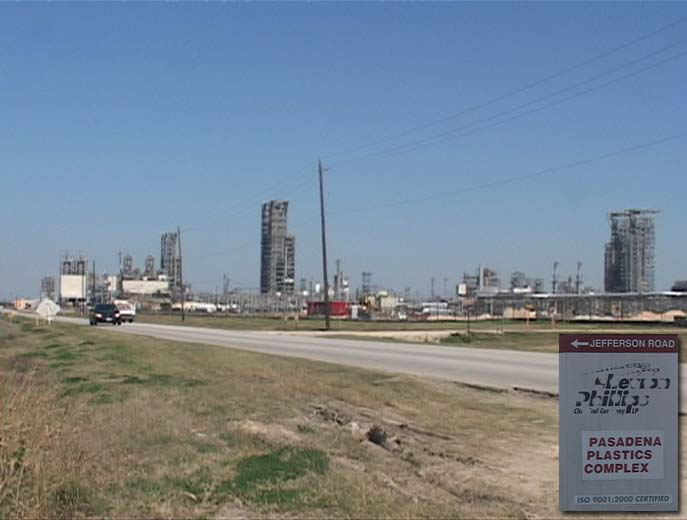
Site of Phillips explosions of 1989, 1999 and 2000 (as photographed in 2008).

At approximately 1:22 p.m. CT on March 27, 2000, an explosion and fire responsible for one death and 71 injuries occurred at Phillips Petroleum's Houston Chemical Complex at 1400 Jefferson Road in Pasadena, Texas. The fire produced huge plumes of black smoke that spread over the heavily industrialized Houston Ship Channel and neighboring residential areas.

The explosion occurred at the K-Resin facility, which made styrene-butadiene, a type of synthetic rubber. At the time of the explosion, the tank was out of service for cleaning and had no pressure or temperature gauges that would have provided the workers with an alert to the approaching crisis. Ultimately, this explosion resulted in one fatality, while 32 Phillips Petroleum employees and 39 subcontractors were taken to local hospitals for sustaining burns, smoke inhalation, and cuts from debris.

It took search crews five hours to locate the body of a missing employee in the rubble. The dead man was Rodney Gott, a 45-year-old supervisor, who barely survived the Phillips Disaster of 1989. During that incident, Gott was in a building when its roof collapsed, but he remained in the blazing plant to save a woman and attend to the injured."

The Occupational Safety and Health Administration's six-month investigation concluded that failure to train workers properly was a key factor in the explosion and fire, and it proposed that Phillips Petroleum be fined $2.5 million in penalties for 50 alleged violations of safety standards at the facility.

== Facility today ==
The facility continued to manufacture high-density polyethylene (HDPE), as well as polypropylene and K-Resin SBC until 2011. This complex employs 750 workers for the production of specialty chemicals, including 150 operations and maintenance personnel.

The facility also experienced fatalities in 1989 and 1999. Today the facility only manufactures polyethylene.

== See also ==
- Chevron Phillips
- Phillips Disaster of 1989
- Phillips explosion of 1999
