= Terri Haverly =

American politician

Member of the South Dakota Senate from the 35th district
- In office January 13, 2015 – January 8, 2019
- Preceded by: Mark Kirkeby
- Succeeded by: Lynne DiSanto

Personal details
- Born: March 20, 1957 (age 69)
- Party: Republican

Terri Haverly (born March 20, 1957) is an American politician who served in the South Dakota Senate from the 35th district from 2015 to 2019.
