= Commissioner v. Glenshaw Glass Co. =

- Supreme Court of the United States

Argued February 28, 1955 Decided March 28, 1955
- Full case name: Commissioner of Internal Revenue v. Glenshaw Glass Company
- Citations: 348 U.S. 426 (more) 75 S. Ct. 473; 99 L. 483; 1955 U.S. LEXIS 1508; 55-1 U.S. Tax Cas. (CCH) ¶ 9308; 47 A.F.T.R. (P-H) 162; 1955-1 C.B. 207

Case history
- Prior: Glenshaw Glass Co. v. Comm'r, 18 T.C. 860 (1952); William Goldman Theatres, Inc. v. Comm'r, 19 T.C. 637 (1953); affirmed, Comm'r v. Glenshaw Glass Co., 211 F.2d 928 (3d Cir. 1954); cert. granted, 348 U.S. 813 (1954).
- Subsequent: Rehearing denied, 349 U.S. 925 (1955).

Holding
- The Court held that Congress, in enacting the income taxation statutes, intended to tax all gain except that which was specifically exempted.

Court membership
- Chief Justice Earl Warren Associate Justices Hugo Black · Stanley F. Reed; Felix Frankfurter · William O. Douglas; Harold H. Burton · Tom C. Clark; Sherman Minton · John M. Harlan II

Case opinions
- Majority: Warren, joined by Black, Reed, Frankfurter, Burton, Clark, Minton
- Dissent: Douglas
- Harlan took no part in the consideration or decision of the case.

Laws applied
- Internal Revenue Code

Commissioner v. Glenshaw Glass Co., 348 U.S. 426 (1955), was an important income tax case before the United States Supreme Court. The Court held as follows:

- Congress, in enacting income taxation statutes that comprehend "gains or profits and income derived from any source whatever," intended to tax all gain except that which was specifically exempted.
- Income is not limited to "the gain derived from capital, from labor, or from both combined."

- Although the Court used this characterization in Eisner v. Macomber, it "was not meant to provide a touchstone to all future gross income questions."

- Instead, income is realized whenever there are "instances of [1] undeniable accessions to wealth, [2] clearly realized, and [3] over which the taxpayers have complete dominion."

- Under this definition, punitive damages qualify as "income" -- even though they are not derived from capital or from labor.

== Facts ==
Two factually distinct cases were consolidated because they presented the same issue.

- In one case, the defendant Glenshaw Glass Company had won an award of punitive damages in an antitrust lawsuit. The defendant did not declare this award as income or pay taxes on it, claiming that it was not subject to taxation. The Internal Revenue Service brought suit to collect the tax.
- In another case, William Goldman Theatres, Inc. neglected to report punitive damages as income. Again, the Internal Revenue Service sued to collect the tax.

== Opinion of the Court ==
The Supreme Court, in an opinion by Chief Justice Earl Warren, held that the award of treble damages was taxable income.

In the opinion, Warren pointed out that the language of section 22(a) (the predecessor of current section 61(a)) was employed by Congress in order utilize "the full measure of its taxing power," as provided for under the Sixteenth Amendment. Essentially, Congress, in enacting section 22(a), intended to tax all gains except those specifically exempted.

The Court then held that the amounts received by the taxpayers in this case were "instances of undeniable accessions to wealth, clearly realized, and over which the taxpayers have complete dominion."

This three-part "test" for determining income is broader than the earlier test employed by the Court in Eisner v. Macomber, and is to this day the preferred test for identifying gross income.

== See also ==
- List of United States Supreme Court cases, volume 348
- Clark v. Commissioner
- Commissioner v. Indianapolis Power & Light Co.
- Haverly v. United States
- Raytheon Production Corp. v. Commissioner
