= Kim Fortun =

American anthropologist and science and technology studies scholar

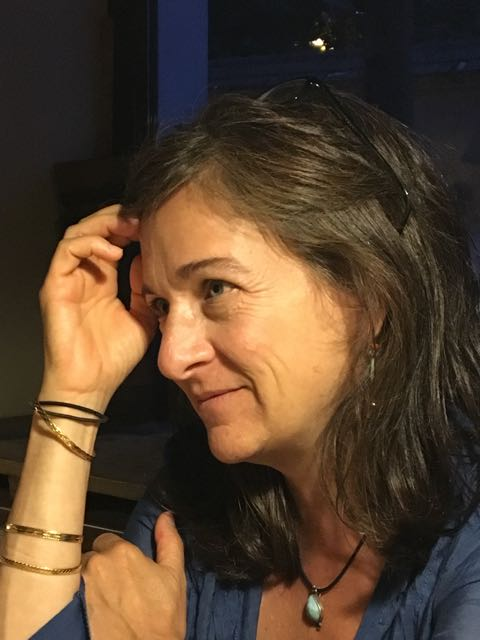
- Kim Fortun in 2016
- Occupation: Academic
- Years active: 1993-present
- Title: Professor
- Board member of: Society for Social Studies of Science
- Spouse: Mike Fortun
- Awards: Sharon Stephens Prize (2003)

Academic background
- Education: Rice University

Academic work
- Discipline: Anthropologist, science and technology studies scholar
- Institutions: Rensselaer Polytechnic Institute (1993-2017); University of California Irvine (2017-present)
- Main interests: Environmental risk and disaster
- Notable works: Advocacy After Bhopal
- Website: http://kfortun.org

Kim Fortun, an American anthropologist, is a professor in University of California Irvine's department of anthropology. Her interests extend also to science and technology studies with a focus on environmental risk and disaster. From 2017 to 2019, she served as the president of the Society for Social Studies of Science (4S).

In 2003, Fortun's first book, Advocacy After Bhopal: Environmentalism, Disaster, New World Orders, was awarded the Sharon Stephens Prize by the American Ethnological Society. From 2005 to 2010, she edited the Journal of Cultural Anthropology. Fortun currently helps lead multiple collaborative projects, including The Asthma Files and the Platform for Experimental and Collaborative Ethnography (PECE). She is also a founding member of the editorial collective of the Journal of Disaster Studies.

== Selected works ==
- Fortun, Kim (2001). Advocacy After Bhopal: Environmentalism, Disaster, New World Orders. Chicago: University of Chicago Press. OCLC 916106017. (Awarded the Sharon Stephens Prize, 2003).
- Fortun, Kim; Fortun, Mike, eds. (2010). Major Works in Cultural Anthropology, Vol 1: Moorings, Vol 2: Modernities, Vol 3: Emergence, Vol 4: Engagements. Sage. OCLC 759926547.
