= Clark v. Commissioner =

Early United States income tax case

- Court: United States Board of Tax Appeals
- Full case name: Edward H. Clark v. Commissioner of Internal Revenue
- Decided: July 27, 1939
- Citation: 40 B.T.A. 333 (1939)

Court membership
- Judge sitting: James Russell Leech

Laws applied
- Internal Revenue Code

Keywords
- Capital loss

Clark v. Commissioner, 40 B.T.A. 333 (1939) was an important early United States income tax case.

== Background ==
=== Facts ===
The taxpayers, husband and wife, made an irrevocable election to file a joint federal income tax return rather than separate returns on the advice of their return preparer. Subsequently, the Service examined the return and assessed a deficiency against the taxpayers. The deficiency existed because the return preparer took a larger deduction from income for capital losses than was allowed by law. If the taxpayers had filed separate returns employing the proper deduction for long-term capital losses, their combined tax liability would have been $19,941.10 less than the amount they paid on their joint return. As recompense for his error, the return preparer indemnified the taxpayers in that amount.

=== Deficiency assessed ===
The Service included the indemnification payment in taxpayers’ income as an amount attributable to the return preparer’s payment of the taxpayer’s income tax liability.

== Opinion of the court ==
The Board rejected the Service’s argument that this payment was income and stated that “[p]etitioner’s taxes were not paid for him by any person . . . [h]e paid his own taxes. . . .The [money] was paid to petitioner, not qua taxes, . . . but as compensation for his loss.” The fact that the underlying obligation was for taxes “is of no moment here.”.

== Current legal status ==
The ultimate grounds for the decision in Clark, that the payment received by the taxpayer from his tax preparer was not "derived from capitol, from labor, or from both combined," is no longer good law. See Commissioner v. Glenshaw Glass Co.

However, the holding in Clark does remain good law. In other words, the reasoning the court used is no longer valid, but the result would be the same today, just for different reasons.
