= South Dakota's 35th legislative district =

American legislative district

South Dakota's 35th State Senate district
Senator
Mike Walsh

South Dakota's 35th legislative district is one of 35 districts in the South Dakota Legislature. Each district elects one senator and two representatives. Its state senate seat has been held by Mike Walsh since 2024. In the state house, it has been represented by Republicans Tina Mulally and Tony Randolph since 2019.

== Geography ==
Located in western South Dakota, the district resides within Pennington County in Rapid City.
