= Alice McCoy (politician) =

American politician (born 1948)

Member of the South Dakota House of Representatives from the 35th district
- In office 1999–2006

Personal details
- Born: March 29, 1948 (age 78)
- Party: Republican
- Spouse: James McCoy
- Children: 2

Alice Lucille McCoy (born March 29, 1948) is an American politician who served as a member of the South Dakota House of Representatives for District 35 from 1999 to 2006.

== Background ==
Elected to the South Dakota House of Representatives in 1998, she assumed office in 1999 and served until 2006.

Due to term limits, she could not run for re-election in 2006, and instead challenged State Senator Bill Napoli in the June 6, 2006 Republican primary. McCoy lost the nomination, receiving 35% of the vote.

McCoy lives in Rapid City, South Dakota. She is married to Jim McCoy and they have two children.
