= Pipe rack =

Steel structures

Structural steel pipe racks typically support pipes, power cables and instrument cable trays in petrochemical, chemical and power plants. Occasionally, pipe racks may also support mechanical equipment, vessels and valve access platforms. Main pipe racks generally transfer material between equipment and storage or utility areas. Storage racks found in warehouses are not pipe racks, even if they store lengths of pipe.

A pipe rack is the main artery of a process unit. Pipe racks carry process and utility piping and may also include instrument and cable trays as well as equipment mounted over all of these.

Pipe racks consist of a series of transverse beams that run along the length of the pipe system, spaced at uniform intervals typically around 20 ft. To allow maintenance access under the pipe rack, the transverse beams are typically moment frames. Transverse beams are typically connected with longitudinal struts.

There are different types of pipes on the pipe rack. Utility pipes which include steam, cooling water, extinguishing water, fuel oil, and so on. These pipes are mostly located in the middle of a one-level pipe rack or on the top level when there are two levels. Then there are the process pipes. These pipes carry product that is part of the chemical reaction itself. These are placed on the outside of the utility pipes (especially if they are heavy) or on the bottom level when there are multiple levels. Lastly, relief and flare pipes which fulfill a safety goal. They protect the installation against too much pressure and are always located on the outside of the rack.

== See also ==
- Pipeline bridge
