= Women's Health and Human Life Protection Act =

State law

The Women's Health and Human Life Protection Act was a state law passed by the South Dakota State Legislature in early 2006. It emerged as an effort to overturn Roe v. Wade via enacting a ban on abortion in the state of South Dakota. The law was repealed by voter referendum on November 7, 2006.

== Legislative history and legal ramifications ==
In 2004, both houses of the South Dakota legislature passed House Bill 1191, outlawing abortions, but it was vetoed by governor Mike Rounds due to a technicality. The state's legislature subsequently passed five laws curtailing the legality of abortion in 2005. The majority of a legislative "task force" then issued a report recommending that the Legislature illegalize all abortions, which would lead to a challenge of the constitutionality of Roe v. Wade in the United States Supreme Court. A separate minority report criticizing the process and reaching different conclusions was also released.

In February 2006, the Legislature passed the Women's Health and Human Life Protection Act, which was signed into law by Governor Mike Rounds on March 6, 2006. This law would have forbidden pregnancy termination under virtually every circumstance, including for victims of rape and incest, with the exception of "a medical procedure designed or intended to prevent the death of a pregnant mother". Physicians performing such procedures would have been required to "... make reasonable medical efforts under the circumstances to preserve both the life of the mother and the life of her unborn child". If these efforts could not be proven physicians could be subject to a fine of $5000 for doing an abortion for any other reason other than to save a women's life.

The act had specifically defined pregnancy as beginning at the point of conception, rather than at implantation into the uterine wall (see beginning of pregnancy controversy), which might have meant that WHHLPA applied to emergency contraception, and on its face possibly all forms of hormonal contraception. The text of the bill read: "Nothing in section 2 of this Act may be construed to prohibit the sale, use, prescription, or administration of a contraceptive measure, drug, or chemical, if it is administered prior to the time when a pregnancy could be determined through conventional medical testing and if the contraceptive measure is sold, used, prescribed, or administered in accordance with manufacturer instructions."

Several members of the South Dakota legislative majority, as well as Governor Rounds, acknowledged that the overt goal of WHHLPA was to get the Supreme Court to overturn Roe, per the recommendation of the task force (the Supreme Court at that time was shifting in a conservative direction, one that might have been more amenable to overturning Roe: See also Supreme Court of the United States – Political Leanings).

== Repeal ==
A referendum to repeal the Women's Health and Human Life Protection Act was placed on ballot for the November 2006 statewide election, due to a successful petition drive by the organization South Dakota Healthy Families. On May 30, over 38,000 petition signatures were filed, more than twice the 17,000 required to place a measure on the ballot. On November 7, WHHLPA was repealed by the South Dakota electorate; the vote was 56%-44% favoring repeal.

== Reaction to WHHLPA ==
- Cecilia Fire Thunder, President of the Oglala Sioux tribe in South Dakota, long-time abortion rights advocate, and former California abortion clinic employee, had discussed establishing a Planned Parenthood clinic on Sioux land, which might not have been subject to the state's jurisdiction. Following her comments, the Tribal Council suspended Fire Thunder and voted against allowing abortions on the reservation.
- Among those who drew national attention as a result of WHHLPA was State Senator Bill Napoli, whose comments about a hypothetical case wherein abortion could be acceptable were widely reprinted (see his article for more).

== See also ==
- Abortion debate
- Reproductive rights
