= William Napoli =

American politician

Member of the South Dakota Senate from the 35th district
- In office January 2003 – January 2009
- Preceded by: Cheryl Madden
- Succeeded by: Jeffrey Haverly

Member of the South Dakota House of Representatives from the 35th district
- In office January 1995 – January 2003
- Preceded by: Mark Hollenbeck
- Succeeded by: Jeffrey Haverly

Personal details
- Born: June 17, 1948 (age 78) Rapid City, U.S.
- Party: Republican
- Spouse: Peggy Napoli

William M. "Bill" Napoli (born June 17, 1948) is a former Republican state senator in the South Dakota State Legislature, representing the 35th State Senate district. He retired in 2008.

On March 20, 2008, Napoli announced that he would not seek re-election and instead would retire from politics. In the Rapid City Journal, Napoli stated that he would run for governor "if his supporters ask him to".

== Comments on abortion ==
Napoli entered the spotlight by virtue of several public statements he made regarding the legislation H.B. 1215, enacted in 2006, to limit abortion access in South Dakota to those cases in which the woman's life would be in danger, possibly anticipating or inviting a repudiation of Roe v. Wade by the Roberts Court.

Among his statements were, "When I was growing up here in the wild west, if a young man got a girl pregnant out of wedlock, they got married, and the whole darned neighborhood was involved in that wedding. I mean, you just didn't allow that sort of thing to happen, you know? I mean, they wanted that child to be brought up in a home with two parents, you know, that whole story. And so I happen to believe that can happen again." Asked about a possible exception to that rule, Napoli replied, "A real-life description to me would be a rape victim, brutally raped, savaged. The girl was a virgin. She was religious. She planned on saving her virginity until she was married. She was brutalized and raped, sodomized as bad as you can possibly make it, and is impregnated. I mean, that girl could be so messed up, physically and psychologically, that carrying that child could very well threaten her life."

=== Reactions to Napoli's comments ===
A comic strip commenting on Napoli's vote appeared in the webcomic Minimum Security on March 22, 2006. It included his office and home telephone numbers, thus prompting calls, some of which were abusive. In Napoli's words, "99% percent of the calls I got were just filth. I bet I didn't talk to 20 or 25 people I could talk to. The rest were screaming obscenities before I could hang up." The cartoonist, Stephanie McMillan, auctioned the original cartoon on eBay for US$2,201.00 and donated all of the money to pro-choice causes. One half was given to Planned Parenthood of Minnesota, North Dakota and South Dakota, and the other half to the Oglala Sioux tribe, because the former tribal president Cecilia Fire Thunder had planned on opening an abortion clinic on the Pine Ridge Indian Reservation.

In early March 2006, a Google bomb was started by the romance blog Smart Bitches Trashy Books in an attempt to popularize a neologism of his last name as something undesirable, much like Dan Savage's reaction in his column "Savage Love" to Rick Santorum's remarks about homosexuality. In early April 2006, his senate webpage was also the subject of a Google bomb for the term "sexist asshat".
