= Channel Industries Mutual Aid =

Non-profit mutual aid network in Texas, US

The Channel Industries Mutual Aid (CIMA) is an American Houston-area non-profit mutual aid network. It is a cooperative among over one hundred emergency response agencies in Harris, Chambers, and Brazoria counties and industrial fire departments from petrochemical refineries along the Houston Ship Channel. CIMA coordinates the distribution of vital resources in short timeframes during man-made or natural disasters, providing rapid and unified fire-fighting, hazardous material, rescue, and safety assistance.

CIMA was formed in 1955 under its original name Houston Ship Channel Industries Disaster Aid Organization, and it adopted its current name in 1960.
