= 2001 Humber Refinery explosion =

Industrial disaster in Lincolnshire, England

Coordinates: 53.6359°N 0.2476°W

The 2001 Humber Refinery explosion was a major incident at the then Conoco-owned Humber Refinery at South Killingholme in North Lincolnshire, England. A large explosion occurred on the Saturate Gas Plant area of the site on Easter Monday, 16 April 2001 at approximately 2:20 p.m. There were no fatalities, but two people were injured.

== Background ==
The Humber refinery occupies a 480 acre (194 ha) site on the south of the Humber. It is about 1.5 km from the town of Immingham and 0.5 km from the village South Kilingholme.

The refinery was commissioned in 1969-70 and comprises a number of processing plants including crude distillation, catalytic reforming, a fluidized cracking unit, an alkylation unit, and a saturate gas plant.

At the time of the incident the refinery was owned and operated by Conoco Limited. On a normal weekday there were about 800 people on the site, at the time of the incident, on Easter Monday a public holiday, there were only about 185 people on the site.

== The plant ==
The incident on 16 April 2001 occurred in the Saturate Gas Plant (SGP) which separates hydrocarbons into various gas and liquid streams. The plant comprises a number of tall distillation columns, separators and condensers. The first column in the plant is the de-ethaniser (W-413) which removes methane, ethane, and propane vapour from the liquid product. The vapour at the top of the column is at a pressure of 400 psig and a temperature of 119°F (27.6 barg and 48.3°C). The vapour flows through a 6-inch diameter overheads line (Line P4363) to the condensers (X-452/3).

After the SGP was commissioned salts and hydrates (ice-like crystals) started to accumulate in the condensers. This began to cause fouling problems and blockages. This had been anticipated in the original design and a water injection point had been installed in a line upstream of the de-ethaniser. Water dissolved corrosive agents in the feed fluid. However, this arrangement was not sufficient to prevent fouling in the downstream condensers. In November 1981 a study recommended that an additional water injection point should be installed in the overheads line. This was done by using a 1” vent point in line P4363 as a water injection point. No Injection quill or other dispersion device was fitted. The injection point was 670 mm upstream of a 90° elbow.

== Causes of failure ==
In operation the overheads line had built up an internal coating of iron sulphide. This so-called pacification layer protected the inside of the carbon steel pipe from corrosion. However, the water wash acted to wash away the protective layer and exposed the steel to attack from corrosive agents in the vapour stream. This is a process of erosion-corrosion and caused the pipe wall to be eroded away at the elbow. At the time of the incident the wall thickness had been reduced from 7-8mm to as little as 0.3mm. The pipe could no longer contain the pressure (27.6 barg) and burst catastrophically releasing the vapour in the line, and in the upstream and downstream plant such as the de-ethaniser column. It was estimated that 80 tonnes of flammable vapour were released from the SGP plant producing a vapour cloud 175m by 80m. The cloud exploded and damaged the SGP causing further release of material which ignited and led to a large fire. This sustained fire damaged plant and weakened pipework leading to further releases. It was estimated that a total of 180 tonnes of flammable liquids and gasses were released.

== Effects ==
The incident temporarily shut down the entire refinery and caused oil prices to increase. Damage was caused to the nearby villages of North and South Killingholme as well as the nearby town of Immingham - mainly doors being blown from their hinges and windows being blown in.

== HSE investigation ==
ConocoPhillips (now Phillips 66) was investigated and subsequently fined £895,000 and ordered to pay £218,854 costs by the Health and Safety Executive for failing to effectively monitor the degradation of the refinery's pipework. The company pleaded guilty to these charges in court and has since implemented a Risk Based Inspection programme.

== See also ==
- Phillips 66
- Humber Refinery
- South Killingholme
- Flixborough Disaster
