= HCF CATCH =

- Company type: Non Profit
- Industry: Process, engineering, energy and renewables
- Founded: 1999
- Headquarters: Stallingborough, England
- Number of locations: 3 - Stallingborough, East Riding of Yorkshire and Huddersfield
- Area served: England
- Services: Membership services, skills and competency development and conferencing
- Owner: Non Profit
- Number of employees: 38
- Website: catchuk.org

HCF CATCH (trading as CATCH) is an industry led, not-for-profit, training facility located in Stallingborough, between Grimsby & Immingham, North East Lincolnshire, which specialises in training for the process, energy, engineering and renewables sectors.

In 1999, HCF CATCH was developed to the support the economy of the £6 billion Humber chemical and chemistry using sectors. The engineering sector has a growing gap of skilled competent workers. Local industry, along with local councils and government support developed a unique training facility to meet industry demands.

In 2006, The Centre for Assessment for Technical Competence Humber (CATCH) was opened. The £8 million training facility has a full-scale Process Plant that simulates a working site, where chemical engineers can train safely without the hazardous risks. The south bank of the Humber is home to many industrial engineering plants, including: Lindsey Oil Refinery, Humber Oil Refinery and Scunthorpe Steel Works, making Stallingborough an accessible training environment.

In 2013, a joint £3.29 million investment, from North East Lincolnshire Council and The European Regional Development Fund, to expand the CATCH facility was completed. This project was made to double the capacity and facilitate future growing demands from industry.
