= Boots Adams =

American business executive

Kenneth Stanley Adams
- Born: August 31, 1899; Horton, Kansas
- Died: March 30, 1975 (aged 75); Bartlesville, Oklahoma
- Resting place: Memorial Park Cemetery
- Education: University of Kansas
- Children: Bud Adams; Mary Louise Adams; Stephen Stanley Adams; Kenneth Glenn Adams; Gary Clark Adams; Stephaine Lynn Adams; Lisa Ann Adams

Kenneth Stanley "Boots" Adams (August 31, 1899 – March 30, 1975) was an American business executive, University of Kansas booster, and civic philanthropist of Bartlesville, Oklahoma. Adams began his career with the Phillips Petroleum Company in 1920 as a clerk in the warehouse department. Twelve years later, he was chosen by founder and president Frank Phillips to fill the newly created position of Assistant to the President. On April 26, 1938, Adams was elected president of Phillips Petroleum Company by the unanimous vote of the company's board of directors.

Upon succeeding Frank Phillips as president, Adams, then 38 years old, became one of the nation's youngest leaders of a major corporation. He remained in continuous service as the company's chief executive until his retirement in 1964. Although he retired from company operations, Adams continued serving as its board chairman until 1968; finishing his affiliation as a board member from 1968 to 1970. During his tenure, Adams grew the business into a major corporation by investing in natural gas and synthetic rubber operations.

== Early life ==
Kenneth Stanley Adams was born August 31, 1899, in Horton, Kansas. He was the son of John V. and Lavella Adams (née Stanley). His father was an engineer for the Rock Island Railroad. In 1902, the family provided room and board to many families affected by a flood, including some of John's co-workers. One of the male guests noticed that Kenneth had a pair of boots he wore even to bed. The man began calling him "Boots". From then on, Kenneth Adams adopted "Boots" as his nickname.

Adams graduated from Wyandotte High School in 1917, the same year brothers Lee Eldas "L.E." and Frank Phillips founded the Phillips Petroleum Company. After graduating, Adams moved to Dewey, Oklahoma and started his first job. He delivered ice in the neighboring town of Bartlesville. Adams said he was happy that the work involved heavy lifting because it helped him maintain his physical conditioning which he would need as a college athlete. He enrolled at the University of Kansas in the fall of 1917 and played on the university's football, baseball, and basketball teams. Although he would have graduated the following year, Adams dropped out of the university in 1920. He decided to place academics on hold and accept a position in the Phillips Petroleum Company.

On September 8, 1920, Adams married Barbara Blanche Keeler; whose brother, W. W. Keeler, would later become president and chief executive officer of Phillips Petroleum Corporation and Principal Chief of the Cherokee Nation. Their eldest son, Kenneth S. Jr., would himself become a business magnate and owner of the Tennessee Titans. In 1945, Boots and Blanche Adams were divorced. Boots Adams married Dorothy Glynn Stephens the following year.

== Career at Phillips Petroleum ==
In 1921, Boots Adams helped organize the Phillips 66ers, an amateur basketball team sponsored by the Phillips Petroleum Company. He also played that year on the team's inaugural roster. Because of his team affiliation, Adams was offered employment with the company. He began working as a warehouse clerk in 1920, and ascended to become the company's president. He was one of the youngest ever to lead a major corporation in the United States.

=== Early executive years ===
Boots Adams first entered the executive tier in 1932. Phillips Petroleum Company's founding president, Frank Phillips, appointed Adams as his assistant. He was promoted despite opposition from executive staff, who considered Boots and Phillips to be an odd team. Frank Phillips was resistant to incorporating Adams' ideas. Phillips instructed Adams: "I'm going to object to everything you do, but you go ahead and do it anyway."

Adams reconstituted the company's amateur basketball team. Phillips had stopped sponsoring it after the 1929–30 season, because of the great depression. Adams personally recruited Joe Fortenberry and Jack Ragland; both of them were Olympians from 1936. He teamed them with Chuck Hyatt, Tom Pickell, Jay Wallenstrom, and Bud Browning. Lastly, he recruited local favorites, Ray Ebling and Dave Perkins to complete the 1937 team.

The Phillips 66ers ended the season in first place. The team was favored to win the AAU tournament as well. Instead, Denver won the championship, 43–38, in Bartlesville. Columnist Chet Nelson called the game: "the greatest game Rocky Mountain fans ever witnessed." In 1958, Boots Adams was inducted into the Helms Foundation Amateur Basketball Hall of Fame.

According to Reference for Business, Phillips and Adams "often disagreed as to how the company should be run." Nevertheless, Adams was able to secure Frank Phillips' confidence, and the authority to move his ideas forward.

At the 1938 stockholders and board of directors annual meeting, company President Frank Phillips announced his plans to retire. He culminated his announcement saying he wanted K.S. Adams, "the fast-talking young man from Kansas with the big ideas, [to] be elected as the new president of Phillips Petroleum Company". The directors subsequently returned a unanimous vote in support of Phillips' recommendation.

=== Years as company president ===
Boots Adams wanted to diversify the company into emerging oil-related industries. After Adams became president of Phillips Petroleum, the company increased its acquisition of natural gas mining rights. Natural gas was burnt off at the wellhead in 1938 as a waste product of oil exploration and the mining rights were cheap. The increased share of natural gas mining reserves increased Phillips' profit when the commodity's value more than doubled by the end of World War II.

Adams supported a start-up venture called Pace Setter as well. He purchased a Pace Setter home and advocated for the concept. They sold modern-style homes that used a wide range of gas appliances. Adams knew of the existing profit potential as the use of natural gas increased. By 1955, the Phillips company had a "commanding share" of natural gas reserves, 13.3 trillion cubic feet worth approximately US$931,000,000 (equivalent to $11,189,347,826 in 2025). Dividends increased, satisfying stockholders, and workers benefited with wage increases commensurate with the company's bottom line.

Adams employed graduates of a variety of scientific disciplines. He advocated that research and technical expertise was needed for companies to compete in the emerging technological society. One of the newly hired professionals was Jack Graves, a geologist from the University of Oklahoma. Adams tasked Graves to evaluate an oil formation known locally as the Mississippi Chat. The evaluation resulted in a significant new discovery of oil. Phillips continued using the study over the following three years – striking a lot of new oil as a direct result.

Adams also diversified the company into the petrochemical industry, creating an additional revenue stream. Newly hired chemical engineers were used to research synthetic polymers (specifically petroleum-based polymers). He noticed the growth of companies like DuPont and Dow, who were doing well based on the economic value of patents. In particular, Adams wanted Phillips to be involved in developing synthetic rubber.

With significant advancements in place, it was already possible to produce a material similar to rubber. It was however, inferior in quality, and cost-prohibitive to produce. Adams was concerned because two processes showed an equal potential to emerge as the preferred manner of production. One depended on distilling an additive for reactivity, while the other used a petroleum-based reagent. Adams was hopeful that rubber would come to be polymerized by petrochemical means.

==== U.S. Synthetic Rubber Program ====
At the beginning of the US involvement in World War II, the supply of natural rubber from Southeast Asia was abruptly cut off. The government knew of the strategic importance of rubber and had instituted the Rubber Reserve Company (RRC) to stockpile reserves of rubber to mitigate the consequences of being cut off from supplies. But the RRC had only one million tons of rubber in reserve, while the military consumed about 600,000 tons annually. Victory would depend on a massive influx of synthetic rubber. The program's success would be measured by tonnage alone. Either sufficient quantities would be produced, giving the Allies a fighting chance or demand would not be satisfied, guaranteeing an inability to prevail.

Boots Adams joined the consortium, dedicating the resources of Phillips Petroleum Company to the effort dubbed GR-S (Government Rubber-Styrene). The program's success was an achievement of high magnitude for the entire group of participants. On August 29, 1998, the GR-S, (also called the U.S. Synthetic Rubber Program), was officially labeled as a National Historic Chemical Landmark. Its records are stored in the archives of the University of Akron in Akron, Ohio.

The market for synthetic rubber grew to become a US$60,000,000,000 (equivalent to $115,960,846,984 in 2025) a year industry by the turn of the century. And Phillips, now ConocoPhillips, retained its share of that market.

==== Spinning off subsidiaries ====
In 1948, Adams began spinning off assets from Phillips' diversification. He formed subsidiaries while retaining a controlling interest in the company and a share of any profits realized. The first company formed was the Phillips Chemical Company. In 1951, it secured lucrative patents for its discovery of polyethylene and further development of it into high-density polyethylene resin (HDPE). The first tangible product derived from the patents was a durable HDPE polyolefin plastic marketed as Marlex. Marlex was the material Wham-O contracted for use to produce its Hula Hoop, a 1950s toy that sold over 25 million units in its first four months on the market. The chemical subsidiary maintained its viability and continues returning profits to its parent company from Bartlesville. As of 2014, having merged with Chevron in 2000, Chevron Phillips Chemical Company operates as a 50-50 venture; splitting costs and profit shares equally. The new entity tossed a coin in its boardroom to settle on the company's name with Chevron winning the toss and electing to have their name appear first.

==== The Adams building ====
In 1949, Adams decided to consolidate the company's in house operations under one roof. The operations at that time were scattered across 38 different facilities. Adams also wanted the company's research laboratories to be fully modernized, to support the profits being generated from research and development. He contracted the architectural firm of Neville and Sharp of Kansas City, Missouri to build a 12-story, 457,000 square feet multipurpose headquarters. It occupied an entire city block in Bartlesville and was named the Adams building. The town also renamed Seventh Street, Adams Street, and in 1962, constructed the Adams Municipal Golf Course in his name. As of 2014, all three namesakes continue to bear Adams' name.

== Retirement ==
Boots Adams retired from his position as company president in 1964, after 44 years with the company. The following year the city of Bartlesville organized a parade and civic holiday to honor Boots Adams on his 66th birthday – and give thanks with a public celebration. The schools in Bartlesville were closed and the town itself was officially renamed Bootsville for the entire day. A huge birthday cake was mocked up to resemble an oil storage tank, and the Phillips 66 logo "stood tall" in its own pair of boots.

Several dignitaries were present as well including President Dwight D. Eisenhower; as both a personal friend of Boots' and a U.S. president, carrying the gratitude of a nation. Eisenhower was a direct beneficiary of the GR-S program and Adams' participation in it. He was arguably the single man with "the most to lose" if GR-S had failed.

The President adopted the hobby of painting in 1950, as a relaxing way to reduce stress. He presented Boots Adams with a portrait he had recently painted – depicting Adams seated at the head of a table, as chairman of the Phillips 66 board. The portrait was a prized heirloom of Adams' second wife, Dorothy Glynn, and remains in the family's care, having been passed on to the eldest daughter of Boots and Dorothy.

W. Clarke Wescoe, the University of Kansas' (KU) 10th chancellor attended as well; thanking Adams for his alumnus support, and philanthropic goodwill. In appreciation, Wescoe announced the university's decision to name its planned on-campus residential complex, the Adams Center. Stanley Learned, Boots Adams' successor as president of Phillips, as well as a KU alumnus himself, showed his support of the university's decision by donating US$100,000 (equivalent to $1,021,647 in 2025) for use "at the chancellors discretion".

== Death and legacy ==
Boots Adams died March 30, 1975, in Bartlesville, Oklahoma and is buried at Bartlesville's Memorial Park Cemetery. Under his leadership, Phillips Petroleum Company transformed from the US$317,000,000 (equivalent to $7,337,260,766 in 2025) entity entrusted to him, into a US$2,000,000,000 (equivalent to $20,761,802,575 in 2025) industry, with over 28,000 employees and 8,000 miles of oil pipeline.

== Bibliography ==
- Ingham, John N. Biographical Dictionary of American Business Leaders. "Adams, Kenneth Stanley." (1983) Greenwood Press. ISBN 0-313-23907-X (v. 1). Available on Google Books.
- Knowles, Ruth Sheldon (March 1, 1980). The Greatest Gamblers: The Epic of American Oil Exploration. Norman, OK: University of Oklahoma Press. ISBN 978-0-8061-1654-9.
- Atta, Dale Van (February 28, 2008). With Honor: Melvin Laird in War, Peace, and Politics. Madison, WI: University of Wisconsin Press. ISBN 978-0-299-22680-0.
- Penick, Monica Michelle (2007). The Pace Setter Houses: Livable Modernism in Postwar America. Ann Arbor, Michigan: ProQuest Publishing Company. UMI number 3290901
- Robbins, Louise S. (January 15, 2001). The Dismissal of Miss Ruth Brown: Civil Rights, Censorship, and the American Library. Norman, OK: University of Oklahoma Press. ISBN 978-0-8061-3314-0.
- Wallis, Michael (1988). Oil Man: The Story Of Frank Phillips & The Birth Of Phillips Petroleum. New York, NY: Doubleday. ISBN 978-0-312-13135-7.
- Perkins, Scott W. (May 26, 2008). Building Bartlesville, (OK): 1945–2000. Mount Pleasant, SC: Arcadia Publishing. ISBN 978-0-7385-5051-0.
- Grundman, Adolph H. (October 1, 2004). The Golden Age of Amateur Basketball: The Aau Tournament, 1921–1968. Lincoln, NE: University of Nebraska Press. ISBN 978-0-8032-7117-3.
