= Russell Hardy =

British businessman

- Education: Imperial College London
- Occupation: Oil trader
- Title: CEO, Vitol
- Term: March 2018-
- Predecessor: Ian Taylor

Russell Hardy is a British businessman, and the chief executive (CEO) of Vitol, the world's largest independent oil trading company.

== Early life ==
Hardy has a master's degree in engineering from Imperial College London.

== Career ==
Hardy began his career working for BP, trading fuel oil.

In 1993, Hardy left BP and joined Vitol. He has been a member of its executive committee since 2007, and CEO of the Europe, Middle-East and Africa region since 2017. In March 2018, he was appointed CEO of the entire company, succeeding Ian Taylor, who became chairman.

In 2022, Hardy predicted that Russia won't be able to protect itself from the negative effects of the international sanctions, while Russian oil export would fall by 1 million barrels a day in winter 2022-2023.
