= Ryan Lance =

American businessman

Ryan Michael Lance
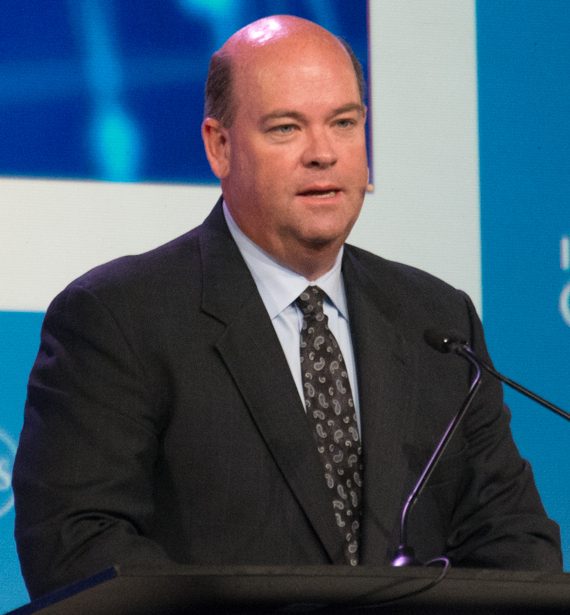
- Born: May 21, 1962 (age 64); Blytheville, Arkansas
- Education: Montana Technological University (BS)

Ryan Michael Lance (born May 21, 1962) is an American engineer and oilman. Since May 2012 he has been the chairman of ConocoPhillips. Lance sits on the advisory board of Montana Technological University.

== Biography ==
=== Early life ===
Lance graduated from Great Falls High School in Great Falls, Montana. He received a Bachelor of Science in Petroleum Engineering from Montana Tech of the University of Montana in Butte, Montana.

=== Career ===
Lance started his career with ARCO Alaska in 1984. In 1989, he moved to the ARCO operations in Bakersfield, California. In 1992, he transferred to Midland, Texas, to work on ARCO's coalbed methane operations in the San Juan Basin. In 1994, Lance returned to Alaska as exploration engineering manager. From 1996 to 1998, he worked for Vastar Resources (a spin-off from ARCO, later merged with Amoco, and finally BP) in Houston, Texas, as planning manager. In 1998, he served as vice president of the Western North Slope for ARCO Alaska. In 2001, he returned to Houston as the general manager of Lower 48 and Canadian operations for the Phillips Petroleum Company. Upon the merger between Conoco, Inc. and Phillips Petroleum Company in 2002, he became Vice President of Lower 48 for ConocoPhillips. Lance has been chairman and CEO of ConocoPhillips since May 2012.

Lance serves on the boards of directors of Spindletop International, the American Petroleum Institute, and the Independent Petroleum Association of America. He is a member of the Society of Petroleum Engineers.

Lance additionally sits on the advisory board of his alma mater, Montana Technological University.
