= Ian Taylor (British businessman) =

British businessman (1956-2020)

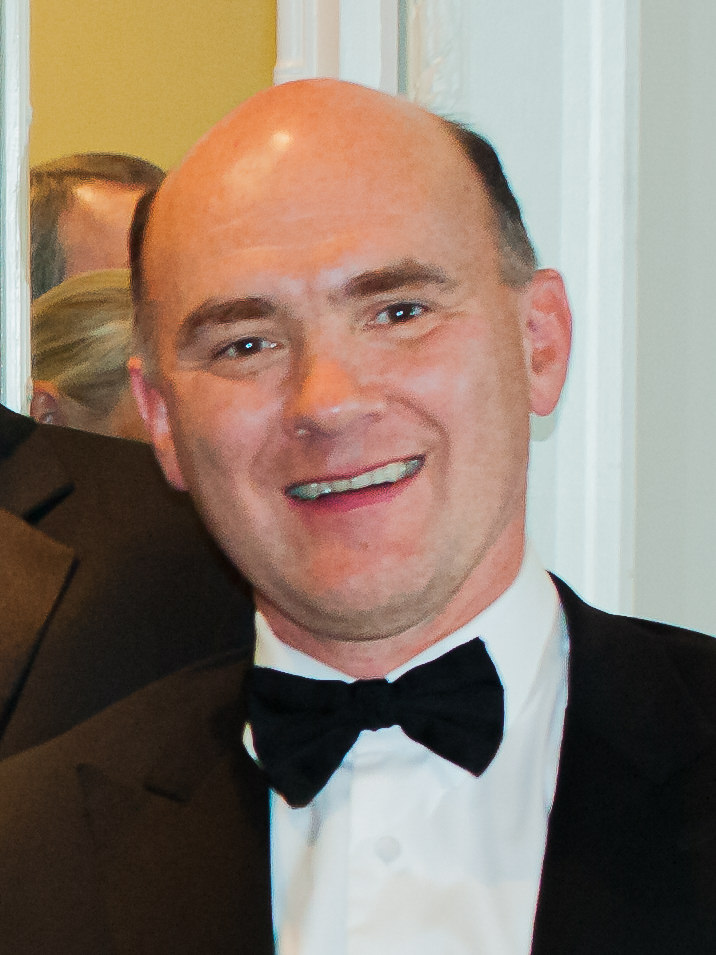
- Ian Taylor, in 2007
- Born: Ian Roper Taylor; 7 February 1956; Croydon, England
- Died: 8 June 2020 (aged 64); UK
- Education: King's School, Macclesfield; Merton College, Oxford
- Occupation: Businessman
- Title: Chairman, Vitol
- Spouse: Dame Cristina Alicia Taylor (née Hare)
- Children: 4

Ian Roper Taylor (7 February 1956 – 8 June 2020) was a British businessman and philanthropist who was chairman and CEO of The Vitol Group, the world's largest independent energy trader. He was also the majority shareholder in Harris Tweed Hebrides, the primary producer of Harris Tweed cloth, which he helped to rescue in 2005.

Taylor donated money to several prominent institutions, including the Royal Opera House, the board of which he chaired, alongside the Rambert Dance Company, the Victoria & Albert Museum, the Royal Academy and the Vitruvian Group, which he helped to found.

A long-term supporter of the Conservative Party, Taylor made donations to the Better Together campaign (for the 2014 referendum on Scottish independence) and to the Remain campaign (for the 2016 referendum on the UK's membership of the EU). In 2016 he was reported to have asked for his name to be withdrawn from consideration for a potential knighthood in David Cameron's resignation honours list; this was apparently in response to hostile media coverage. A regular participant in the Speakers for Schools initiative, Taylor was a founding shareholder of the British Americas Cup bid.

The Sunday Times Rich List 2017 estimated Taylor's wealth at £180 million.

== Early life ==
The son of an ICI executive from Ayrshire, Taylor was born in Croydon, Surrey, and grew up in Manchester. For a brief period in his teens the family home was in Tehran, where Taylor's father worked for a while before the Iranian revolution of 1978–1979. He was educated at King's School, Macclesfield (1968–1974) and then at Oxford University (1975–1978), where he read Politics, Philosophy and Economics at Merton College.

== Career ==
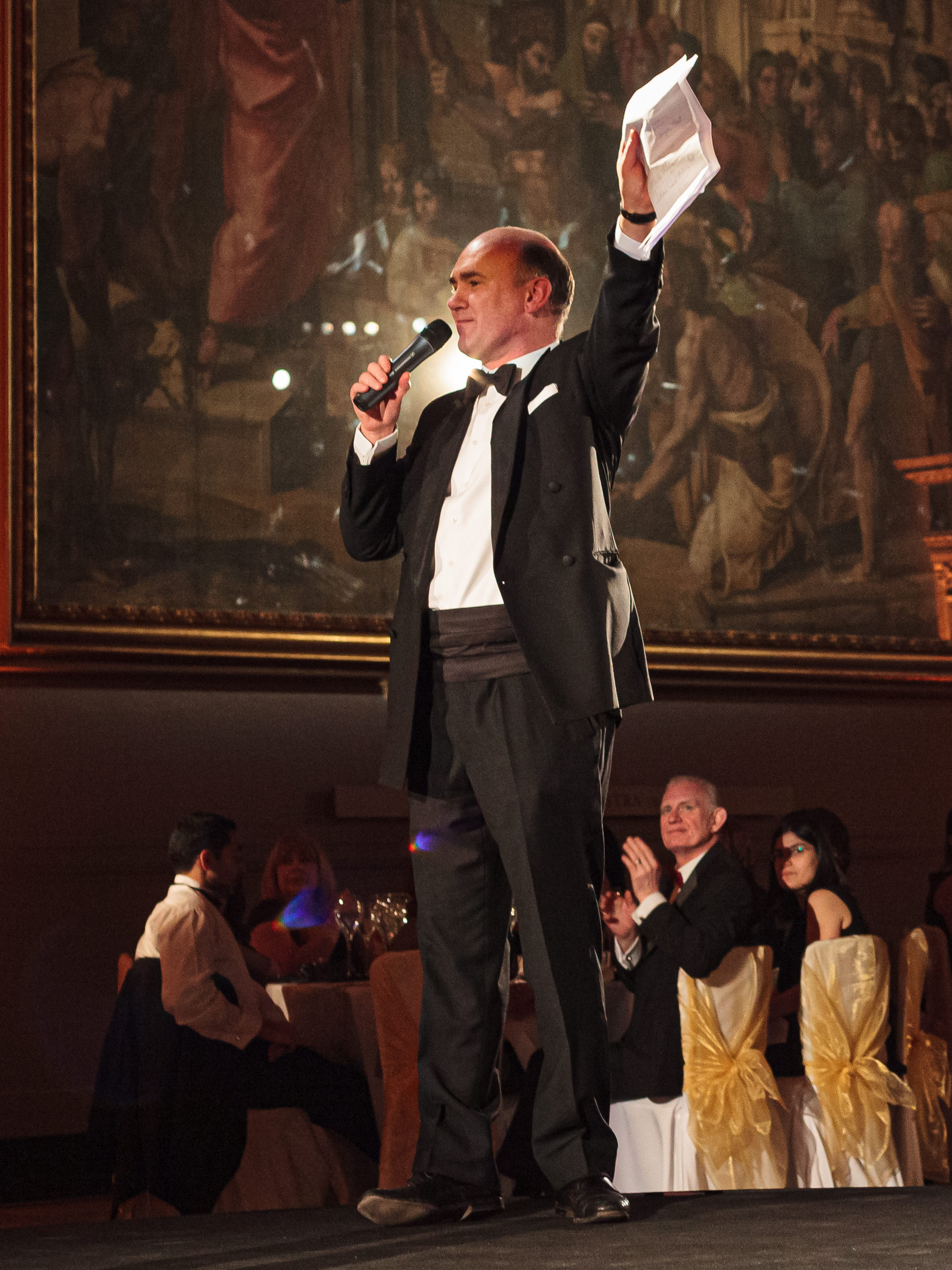
Ian Taylor at Vitol's Christmas party in 2010

Taylor joined Shell shortly after graduating in 1978. Within a year he had been sent to Venezuela as a trading representative. He also performed roles in operations and trading. In 1982 he became a crude and products trader, based in Singapore, before moving in 1985 to Vitol Group, a Dutch-owned energy and commodities company, with headquarters in Switzerland, which employs more than 5,440 people in 40 offices worldwide. Taylor spent seven years as a London-based manager for Vitol before moving back to Singapore as managing director of Vitol Asia in March 1992. He set up a global crude oil trading team and was involved in the formation of many international operations for the company.

In June 1995, he was appointed CEO of Vitol Group, and held the position until March 2018, when he was replaced by Russell Hardy. The company has undergone considerable expansion and now trades more than 7 million barrels of crude oil and related products every day and ships more than 350 million tonnes of crude oil and products each year. With 2016 revenues of $152 billion, Vitol is the world's biggest independent oil trading company. In 2015 it was the world's ninth biggest corporation by revenue

In addition to its trading activities, Vitol has stakes in five refineries worldwide, with a total refining capacity of 390,000 barrels a day, and has 15.9 million cubic metres of owned storage capacity. In 2013 Vitol purchased the Immingham Combined Heat and Power plant in Lincolnshire for an undisclosed price. The giant gas-power plant, subsequently valued at £733m, is the company's only major UK operation.

Taylor was a non-executive director at Fortune Oil PLC, a position he held beginning in 1996. He served as an executive director of the same company from 1993 to 1996. He was a director of Wimbledon Cafés Ltd and Wimbledon Restaurants Ltd. He was a director of Weybourne Ltd, Weybourne Investment Holdings, Rosehill GP Ltd, Taypey Ltd and Allegro Enterprises Ltd. He was a member of the advisory board of Stonehage Fleming Private Equity Ltd.

== Harris Tweed ==
In 2005, at the request of former Labour Party minister Brian Wilson, Taylor rescued the historic clothing brand Harris Tweed from the brink of collapse, purchasing the derelict Shawbost mill on the Isle of Lewis for a reported £500,000, rebranding it as Harris Tweed Hebrides and investing a further £2 million into turning the business around. Today, the company has a staff of 80, as well as providing employment for 130 self-employed home-based weavers, and has a global customer-base that includes such brands as Chanel and J.Crew.

In 2013, Harris Tweed Hebrides was named UKFT Textile Company of the Year, and in 2015 it was Scottish Exporter of the Year for 2015. It has also won awards for outstanding contribution to style and fashion.

== Philanthropy ==
=== Vitol Foundation ===
Vitol began making charitable grants in 2002, and in 2006 the Vitol Foundation was established, with Taylor as its first chairman. Its declared purpose is to enable children living in deprivation to escape the cycle of poverty and reach their potential in life. Vitol employees are encouraged to identify projects that could benefit from the Foundation's support. Since 2006 the Vitol Foundation has funded over 2,000 projects, with a combined value of about £160 million, in 124 countries around the world. In 2011 it received Save the Children's inaugural Outstanding Emergency Partner award.

=== Taylor Family Foundation ===
In February 2007, Ian and Tina Taylor established the Taylor Family Foundation to increase the effectiveness of their charitable giving. The Foundation's main objectives are to advance education and promote the arts, especially by providing children and adults with access to training, tutoring and performances in the disciplines of drama and dance. It also tries to provide sports and recreational facilities for underprivileged young people.

In the first eight years of its existence the Foundation spent more than £13.8 million on grants and charitable activities. In the financial year ending March 2016, Taylor made donations totaling £2 million to the foundation, which in the same period gave grants totaling £1,947,000 to 35 charitable causes, including the Royal Opera House the Covent Garden Foundation, Merton College, Oxford, the Tate Foundation, Maggie's Centres, Random Dance Company, Southbank Centre, the Lowry Centre Trust, the Mosaic Jewish Primary School, Médecins Sans Frontières, Polka Children's Theatre, the University of Stirling, Royal Academy of Arts School Scholarship, West London Zone, Children's Hospice Association Scotland, Linden Lodge Charitable Trust, The Wimbledon Civic Theatre Trust, Depaul UK, Prisoners' Education Trust, Rambert (Merton Schools Rambert Imprints), Noah's Ark Children's Hospice, Great Ormond Street Hospital (Play Services), Beanstalk, St Giles Trust, the Royal Ballet School, The Mix (formerly Get Connected), King's College School, Dumfries House, Save the Children, the NSPCC, Mayor's Fund for London, Honey Pot Children's Charity, Royal London Society and English Heritage (Waterloo 200).

=== Other voluntary activities ===
In addition to the work of his foundations, Taylor provided his services on a voluntary basis to a number of artistic institutions. In September 2016 he was appointed chairman of the Board of Trustees of the Royal Opera House (ROH). He had been chair of the ROH's Development Committee since 2013. He and his wife (who is an honorary director) were particularly associated with the ROH's programme of Schools Matinées, which allowed young people to attend performances at heavily subsidised prices, funded by the Taylor Family Foundation. Taylor was on the development board of the Victoria and Albert Museum and served on the board of Rambert Dance Company (formerly Ballet Rambert) from 2009 to 2014. He was also an honorary member of the Tate Foundation, supporting the creation of the Taylor Digital Studio at Tate Britain; and was a founder member of the Vitruvian Group, an international philanthropy circle that supports the work of the choreographer Wayne McGregor. In 2015, Taylor gave a keynote speech at Dance UK's conference, "The Future: New Ideas, New Inspirations", discussing the importance of supporting dance education to ensure the sector's future talent. Other causes supported by the Taylors included UNICEF and the cancer charity Momentum. "I'm a great believer in creating wealth so you can distribute it", Taylor told The Daily Telegraph in 2015.

== Personal life ==
Taylor met his future wife, Cristina Alicia Hare, in 1979, in Venezuela, where he was posted by his first employer, Shell.

Taylor described himself as feeling "proudly Scottish" although his accent suggested North West England. He supported Manchester City. A keen patron of the arts and an active philanthropist, he lived mainly in London but also had a home in Scotland.

== Death ==
Taylor died from cancer on 8 June 2020, aged 64, and was survived by his wife and four children. In the 2024 New Year Honours, his widow, Cristina Alicia Taylor, was named a Dame Commander of the Order of the British Empire.
