= Ming City Rockers =

English four-piece rock band

- Origin: Immingham, Lincolnshire, England
- Genres: Punk, blues, rock
- Years active: 2012–present
- Label: Mad Monkey Records
- Members: Clancey Jones; Morley Adams; Jack Scales
- Past members: Doc Ashton; Wan Marshall; Ramona Rae; Harvey Beck; Jakki Walsh; Ben Scales
- Website: www.mingcityrockers.co.uk

Ming City Rockers are an English three-piece rock band from Immingham, Lincolnshire, England. Their style has been compared to that of "the spirit of MC5" and their debut album was released on 20 September 2014.

== Biography ==
They originate from the industrial town of Immingham - about 6 miles (10 km) north-west from Grimsby, on the east coast of northern England. The group were originally formed under the name of Low Culture in 2010 and changed their name to Ming City Rockers - inspired by The Clash song "Clash City Rockers" - two years later. They released their début single "Chic & The Motherfuckers" in July 2013.

They were featured in Q's 'Who? What? Where? Why?' series in April 2014.

Ming City Rockers' debut and self-titled studio album was released on 15 September 2014. "Chic and The Motherfuckers"," I Wanna Get Outta Here But I Can't Take You Anywhere" and "Rosetta" were recorded at Yellow Arch Studios in Sheffield, Yorkshire, in February 2013. The rest of the album was recorded in September 2013 at Tesla Studios, also in Sheffield.

Their second album, Lemon, recorded and produced by Steve Albini, was released on 1 April 2016. After the release of the album, Ramona left the band and was replaced by Jakki Walsh, who returned for a short period before leaving again, when Ramona once again became bassist. However, shortly after the well-received tour of Germany and Spain in early 2017, Ramona departed again, and the bass slot was finally handed to Harvey Beck, who subsequently moved to the drum seat following the departure of Wan Marshall, and the return of Jakki Walsh to the bass guitar in mid 2018 with a show at Yardbirds Club in Grimsby, and The Springhead in Hull in October, where new songs were introduced.
