= Concho Resources =

Defunct U.S. energy company

Concho Resources Inc.
- Type: Public company
- Traded as: NYSE: CXO
- Industry: Petroleum industry
- Founded: 2004; 22 years ago
- Founder: Timothy A. Leach
- Defunct: January 15, 2021; 5 years ago
- Fate: Acquired by ConocoPhillips
- Headquarters: Midland, Texas
- Key people: Timothy A. Leach, Chairman and CEO; Jack F. Harper, CFO
- Production output: 331 thousand barrels of oil equivalent (2,030,000 GJ) per day (2019)
- Revenue: ▲US$4.592 billion (2019)
- Operating income: ▼US$−987 million (2019)
- Net income: ▼US$−705 million (2019)
- Total assets: ▼US$24.732 billion (2019)
- Total equity: ▼US$17.782 billion (2019)
- Number of employees: 1,453 (2019)
- Website: www.concho.com

Concho Resources Inc. was a company engaged in hydrocarbon exploration, incorporated and organized in Delaware and headquartered in Midland, Texas, with operations exclusively in the Permian Basin. In 2021, the company was acquired by ConocoPhillips.

As of December 31, 2019, the company had 1,002 million barrels of oil equivalent (6.13×10^{9} GJ) of estimated proved reserves, of which 63% was petroleum and natural gas liquids and 37% was natural gas. Of these reserves, 55% were in the Delaware Basin and 45% were in the Midland Basin.

== History ==
In 2004, the company was founded as Concho Equity Holdings Corporation by a group of businessmen headed by Timothy A. Leach. That same year, the company acquired properties from Lowe Management for $117 million.

The company became a public company via an initial public offering in 2007. On January 15, 2021, the company was acquired by ConocoPhillips.

=== Acquisitions ===
The company acquired assets from Chase Oil and formed Concho Resources Inc. in 2006. Henry Petroleum was acquired for $584 million in 2008.

In 2010, the company acquired assets in the Permian Basin from Marbob Energy Corporation for $1.65 billion. Two years later, the company acquired Three Rivers Operating Company for $1 billion.

The company acquired assets in the Midland Basin from Reliance Energy in October 2016 for $1.625 billion.

A month later, assets in the Delaware Basin were acquired for $430 million. In July 2018, the company acquired RSP Permian.
