= Immingham Power Station =

Combined heat and gas-fired power plant

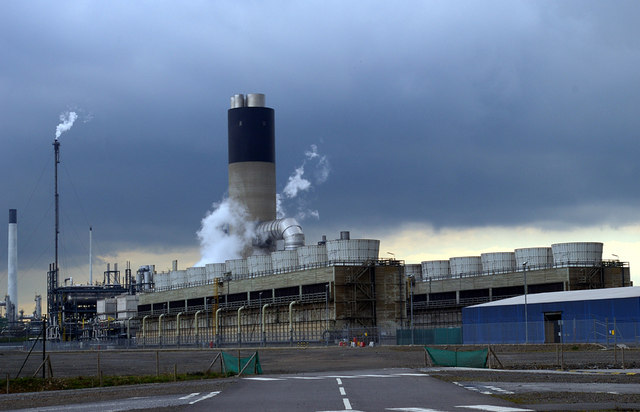
- Immingham power station Viewed from the south in April 2006
- Country: England
- Location: Lincolnshire, Yorkshire and the Humber
- Coordinates: 53.63833°N 0.23328°W
- Status: Operational
- Commission date: 2004
- Owner: Vitol
- Operators: Conoco Phillips Power Operations (2004–present)

Thermal power station
- Primary fuel: Natural gas

Power generation
- Units operational: 2004
- Nameplate capacity: 730 MW

External links
- Website: www.vpi-i.com
- Commons: Related media on Commons

Immingham Combined Heat and Power Plant (also known as VPI Immingham) is a combined heat and power, gas-fired power plant adjacent to the Humber Oil Refinery near to South Killingholme North Lincolnshire, England.

The plant opened in 2004 with a 730 MW generating capacity, and was expanded to 1,180 MW in 2009; the station was developed by ConocoPhillips until its sale to Vitol in 2013.

== History ==
Prince Andrew, Duke of York visited on the morning of Tuesday 5 July 2005, later visiting Grimsby, and the local police helicopter at Kirmington Airport.

== Description ==
See main article Industry of the South Humber Bank § Industrialization in "ConocoPhillips"

A 734 MW power station was developed at a cost of £350 million by ConocoPhillips and opened in 2004 adjacent to the Humber Oil Refinery. The plant supplied 'waste' steam to both Humber and Lindsey Oil Refineries, and incorporated auxiliary boilers for steam supply to the refineries.

In 2009 the plant's capacity was raised to 1,180 MW, by the addition of a 285 MW gas turbine, and 200 MW heat recovery steam generator. In 2013 the plant was acquired by Vitol.

In August 2020, consent was given for the development of an additional gas-fired plant to be built next to the current facility. The expansion will increase Immingham's output to 1,240 MW. The proposal was initially made in July 2018.
