= South Killingholme =

Village and civil parish in Lincolnshire, England

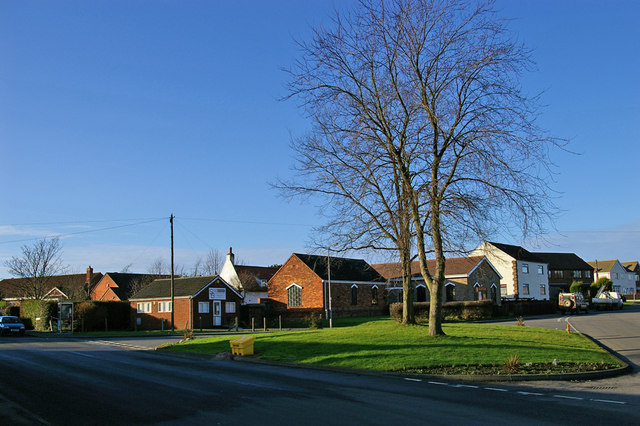
- South Killingholme village

- Location within Lincolnshire
- Population: 1,108 (2011 Census)
- OS grid reference: TA178145
  - London: 150 mi (240 km) S
- Unitary authority: North Lincolnshire
- Ceremonial county: Lincolnshire
- Region: Yorkshire and the Humber
- Country: England
- Sovereign state: United Kingdom
- Post town: IMMINGHAM
- Postcode district: DN40
- Dialling code: 01469
- Police: Humberside
- Fire: Humberside
- Ambulance: East Midlands
- UK Parliament: Great Grimsby and Cleethorpes

South Killingholme is a village and civil parish in North Lincolnshire, England. The population of the civil parish at the 2011 census was 1,108.Been around since 1960s there has been 2 schools one of them been demolished early 1960s used as a primary school near the newley built hairdresser built in the 2000s. All there locations are very unique like greengate lane park known as big park.The important places in south Killingholme is Killingholme primary school and londis shop.1997 Monday September 17th/I don't know he date I just guessed sorry the local Phillips 66/the refinery had a huge explosion killing nearly everyone in our village due to the impact.Borders north Killingholme Immingham east Halton and stalling-borough located in north Lincolnshire with 100s of other villages and towns.

The parish was predominately agricultural and sparsely populated and the village small until the 1960s when industrialisation of the south Humber bank took place throughout area north-west of Grimsby – within the parish of South Killingholme the Humber Oil Refinery was built in the late 1960s. At the same time the village greatly expanded reaching near its present (2006) scale by the early 1970s.

The expansion of the Port of Immingham westwards encroached on the parish from the 1970s onwards, mainly due to the Immingham Bulk Terminal (1970) and later Immingham Gas Jetty (1985); in 2004 a 730 MW powerstation Conoco Philips Power Station (now known as Immingham Power Station) was built alongside the refinery.

As of 2006 the land area of the parish consists of an approximately 50:50 split of heavy industry – petroleum storage, refining and power generation; and agricultural land. South Killingholme is the only village in the parish and is located roughly in the centre of area.

== Geography ==
The parish of South Killingholme extends from the Humber Estuary foreshore roughly southwest through the village of South Killingholme to a boundary near Ulceby railway station; the parish is roughly 3.7 miles (6 km) long (north-west to south-east) and 1.2 miles (2 km) wide. The parish had a population of 1,047 at the 2001 census, and at the 2011 census a population of 1,108. The parish is in the Ferry ward of North Lincolnshire.

The southeastern and southern sides of the parish forms a boundary with the parishes of Immingham and Habrough and with the administrative county of North East Lincolnshire, following the line of the main drain leading to South Killingholme Haven. The southwestern edge of the parish extends as far as, and included Ulceby railway station, (Note: 53.619337°N 0.300783°W, Ulceby railway station) 1.2 miles (2 km) east of the village of Ulceby, where the boundary is with the parishes of Brocklesby and Ulceby, much of the boundary following the line of the canalized Skitter Beck. The northwestern boundary is entirely with the parish of North Killingholme, running southeast–northwest; from the southern part along the West Mere Middle Road, then bisecting the Lindsey Oil Refinery, and exiting the bank of the Humber Estuary halfway between north and south Killingholme havens.

The parish is low lying rising from less than 5 metres (16 ft) above sea level near the Humber bank, to a peak of 17 metres (56 ft) above sea level in the southwest part of the parish, south of the village. Half of the parish is in agricultural use, primarily farming but including some plantations, the land is drained by man made ditches. The only human habitation in the parish of any note is the village of South Killingholme, (Note: 53.629712°N 0.260466°W, South Killingholme village) near to the centre of the parish.

The remainder of the parish is used for industrial and logistical purposes – northeast of the village is the Humber Oil Refinery, (Note: 53.634025°N 0.248377°W, Humber Oil Refinery) with the Lindsey Oil Refinery to the north also partially in the parish. Near the banks of the Humber the development of the Port of Immingham estate extends into the parish, specifically the western part of the Immingham Bulk Terminal, known as the Humber International Terminal; and the Immingham Gas Terminal; the freight branch line to the docks (formerly the Humber Commercial Railway) runs through the parish from a junction near Ulceby station. To the northwest along the banks is the Killingholme gas jetty, (Note: 53.648450°N 0.209012°W, Killingholme Gas Jetty) and an associated storage facility. Three lighthouses, all constructed in the 19th century, are located on the Humber bank near to the oil storage terminal.

The A1077 / A160 passes through the parish from a junction with the A180 passing through the village, and connecting to Immingham Dock.

== Lighthouses ==
Killingholme High Lighthouse Range Rear
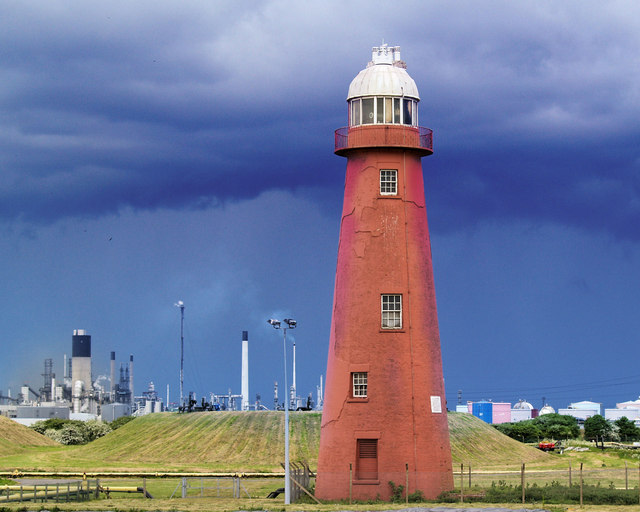
- Killingholme High Lighthouse in 2007
- Location: South Killingholme; Lincolnshire; England
- OS grid: TA1783418214
- Coordinates: 53.647198°N 0.218865°W

Tower
- Constructed: 1836 (first)
- Construction: brick tower
- Height: 24 metres (79 ft)
- Shape: tapered cylindrical tower with balcony and lantern
- Markings: red tower, white lantern dome
- Operator: Port of Grimsby and Immingham
- Heritage: Grade II listed building

Light
- First lit: 1876 (current)
- Deactivated: 2017
- Focal height: 21 metres (69 ft)
- Range: 3 nmi (5.6 km; 3.5 mi)
- Characteristic: Oc R 4s.

Three lighthouses were built on the Humber bank during the 19th century : Killingholme High (1831, rebuilt 1876), (Note: 53.647203°N 0.218854°W, Killingholme High Lighthouse) and Killingholme South Low lighthouses (1836), (Note: 53.646555°N 0.216172°W, Killingholme South Low Lighthouse) were used together to guide ships on the Humber to the south; whilst Killingholme High and Killingholme North Low (1851), (Note: 53.649345°N 0.219678°W, Killingholme North Low Lighthouse) were used together to guide ships on the Humber to the north. The North Low Light has been inactive since 1920.

Also in use on the Humber banks at the beginning of the 20th century were brick works northwest of South Killingholme Haven. (Note: 53.638372°N 0.208163°W, Brick and tile works (site of))

== History ==
There is archaeological (cropmark) evidence of human activity near to the present village to at least the Iron Age/Roman Britain period, with cropmark evidence of activity continuing into the medieval period. It is thought there was once a moated manor at South Killingholme, north of the modern village, dating to the Norman period or earlier, no remnants of the site remain. (Note: 53.633361°N 0.265362°W, Moated site (site of)) The name Killingholme is Swedish and translates into 'Goat kid islet'. There are numerous 'Killingholme' and 'Killingholmen' in Sweden, as well as in Finland (which for 700 years was part of Sweden). A remnant of the early village is "The Nook", a timber-framed house dating to the 17th century or earlier, close to the church.

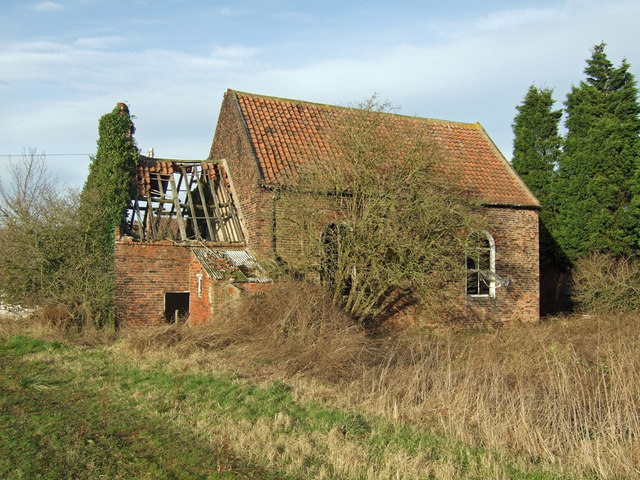
1792 Baptist chapel (2008)

A baptist chapel was built in 1747, and was reconstructed 1792 (now listed).

The Grimsby and New Holland Railway (part of the Great Grimsby and Sheffield Junction Railway) opened in 1848; Ulceby railway station opened the same year, around 1.9 miles (3 km) west of the village. By 1886 the village had a school, post office, Methodist chapels and consisted of around twenty dwellings scattered mostly along Greengate Road, Town Street and School Road. By the turn of the 20th century the Cross Keys Inn had been built west of the traditional village centre, and by the 1930s a limited amount, less than 20 dwellings, of additional housing had been built.

By 1872 the population of South Killingholme was 574, approximately triple that of North Killingholme. In addition to a Baptist chapel, there were now Wesleyan and Primitive Methodist chapels in the village.

The Barton and Immingham Light Railway was opened c. 1910 passing through the parish north of the village, parallel to the Humber bank; Killingholme railway station opened in 1910 on the line 1.9 miles (3 km) northeast of the village. (Note: 53.648185°N 0.225509°W, Killingholme railway station (site of)) The Barton and Immingham Line connected to the Humber Commercial Railway which also ran through the parish – both were built as part of the development of the Immingham Dock.

By 1930 a fish meal and oil works had been built between the lights and brickworks, (Note: 53.644084°N 0.213788°W, Fish meal works (site of)) with its own jetty onto the Humber. Both the fish and brick works were rail connected to the new light railway. Additionally some terraced housing was built, Marsh Row, near Marsh farm on Marsh Lane, southeast of the fish meal works. No significant developments took place in the parish from the 1930s to the Second World War, and through the 1940s and 1950s.

During the 1960s the area experienced large scale industrial development, primarily the Humber Refinery, developed by Continental Oil (see Industry of the South Humber Bank.) The road network was greatly developed, with existing roads (A160) widened; sidings from the former Humber Commercial railway were built for the oil refineries. On the banks of the Humber the fish meal and brick works became defunct – a jetty for hydrocarbon import was built, the Killingholme Gas Jetty, with an associated storage facility, in the environs of the lighthouses. Services on the Barton to Immingham Line ended in 1963.

At the same time as the industrial expansion the village of South Killingholme grew greatly. By the mid-1960s the number of houses in the village had multiplied, with houses built along Greengate Lane, Town Street, Top Road and elsewhere. By the beginning of the 1970s the area bounded by Greengate Lane, Top Road and School Road, and Town Street had been filled with housing development, with new estates and roads to the north of Greengate Lane (St Deny's Road). Housing development then stablished, excluding further houses built on Lancaster Road, with no further major development to 2006.

Expansion of the Port of Immingham led to some storage facilities of the Immingham Bulk Terminal being built west of South Killingholme Haven (1970) within the parish. Another gas jetty, Immingham Gas Jetty, was built between the existing jetty and bulk terminal. (Note: 53.64525°N 0.20605°W, Immingham Gas Terminal jetty) In the first decade of the 21st century the bulk terminal was substantially expanded westwards into the parish; the new facility being known as the Humber International Terminal. (Note: 53.64222°N 0.20218°W, Humber International Terminal jetty)

The South Killingholme area was struck by an F1/T3 tornado on 23 November 1981, as part of the record-breaking nationwide tornado outbreak on that day.

In 2004 ConocoPhillips constructed a 730 MW power station (Conoco Philips Power Station, also known as Immingham Power Station) adjacent to their Humber Refinery. (Note: 53.63764°N 0.23630°W, Immingham gas power station (Vitol), former Conoco Philips power station) In 2005 the same company established a wood "Mayflower Wood" – a 120-acre (0.49 km^{2}) area was planted with over 60,000 trees and shrubs. In 2009 the power station was expanded, increasing output to 1,180 MW.

In 2015 construction work on the "A160/A180 Port of Immingham Improvement" road improvement scheme was begun. The road improvement scheme was intended to convert the A160 from single to dual carriage way, with new junctions onto the A180 and A1173; as part of the scheme access from one side of South Killingholme to the other across the A160 was to be ended and replaced with a road bridge on Town Street over the dual carriageway.

In August 2024, plans were announced for three major data centres and a neighbouring glasshouse on a site adjacent to the A160 in South Killingholme.

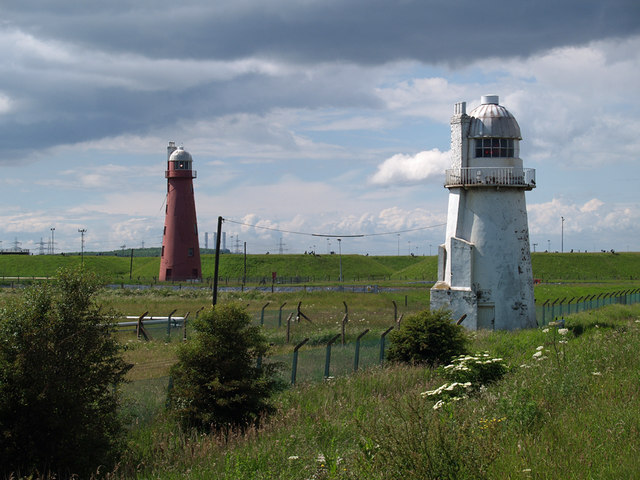
Killingholme High (red) and South Low (white) lighthouse (2008)

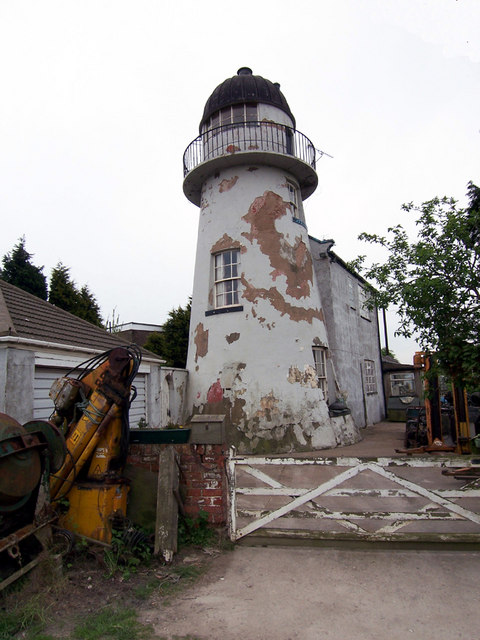
Killingholme North Low lighthouse (2006)

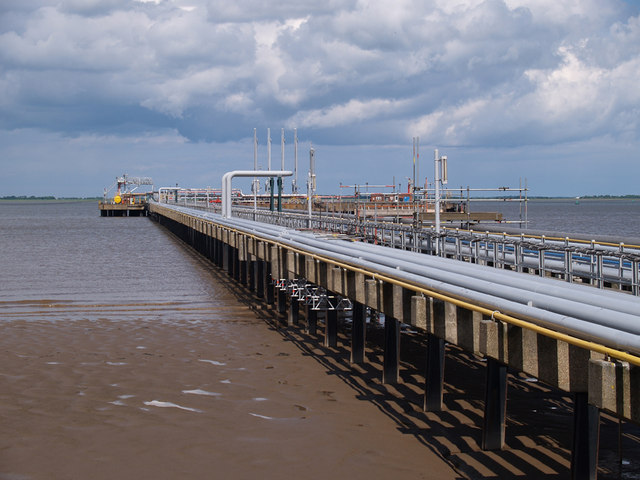
South Killingholme Oil Jetty (2008)

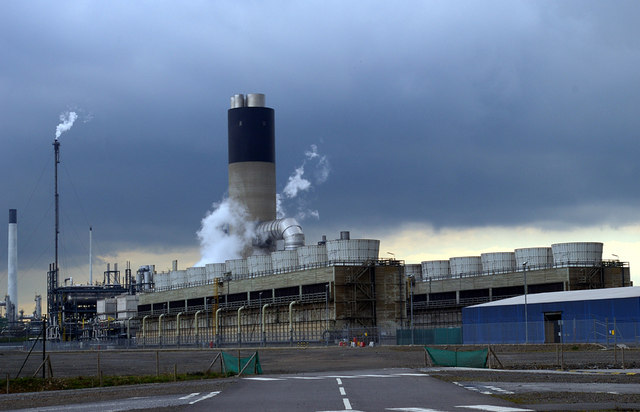
Conoco Philips power station (2006)

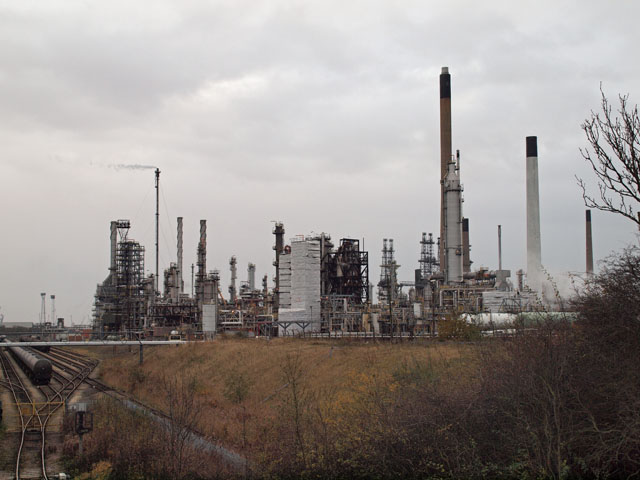
Humber oil refinery (2009)

== See also ==
- North Killingholme
