= Lee Eldas Phillips =

American businessman (1876–1944)

L. E. Phillips
- Born: Lee Eldas Phillips; August 18, 1876; Taylor County, Iowa, U.S.
- Died: April 16, 1944 (aged 67); Bartlesville, OK, U.S.
- Spouse: Leonora Carr (m. 1902)

Lee Eldas Phillips (1876-1944) was an American businessman noted for founding Phillips Petroleum Company. He was also a prominent rancher in the Osage County area.

== Biography ==
Phillips was born in Taylor County, Iowa on August 18, 1876. He was the son of Lewis and Lewcinda Phillips, who moved to Nebraska. He was fourth of ten children, which included Frank and Waite Phillips. Their farm, however, was struck during the grasshopper plague of 1874 and the family moved back to Iowa. Phillips was educated in rural schools and went to Western Normal College in Shenandoah, Iowa.

Lewis was recorded as a soldier during the American Civil War and served under Captain Nelson T. Spoor, who led the Dodge Battery unit.

Phillips married Lenora Carr in 1902. The couple had three children: Phillip Rex, Lee Eldas, Jr., and Martha Jane Phillips.

== Phillips Petroleum Company ==
Phillips together with his brother Frank came to Bartlesville, Oklahoma after the turn of the century, where they drilled their first successful oil well in 1905. Oil, however, during this period was not considered as a critical product as cars were powered by steam and electricity. For instance, gasoline was considered a useless product prior to the invention of the internal combustion engine. In addition, when the Phillips brothers were undertaking their successful drills, cars were still considered inaccessible to the masses, which only changed after the mass production of Ford's Model T. An account stated that the Phillips brothers wanted to get out of the oil business and concentrate on banking but this changed with the outbreak of World War I, which required oil to power the machineries of war.

The pair went to drill successful oil wells, consolidated their assets, and founded Phillips Petroleum Company in June 1917 as demand for oil soared both domestic and overseas. The latter served as company's president. During the war, L.E. Phillips was appointed to the Oklahoma State Council of Defense and was also the chair of Red Cross and Liberty Loan campaigns operating in Oklahoma and the Texas panhandle.

Due to declining health, L.E. Phillips began travelling with his family. It was reported the President Herbert Hoover offered Phillips the position of governor general of the Philippines. He declined this offer and also retired as vice president, general manager, and executive committee chairman of Phillips Petroleum Company in 1934. He died on April 16, 1944 at Bartlesville a year after suffering a stroke.
