= James Mulva =

American businessman (born 1946)

James J. Mulva
- Born: June 19, 1946 (age 80); De Pere, Wisconsin, U.S.
- Education: University of Texas at Austin
- Occupation: Businessperson
- Years active: 1973-2012
- Employer: ConocoPhillips
- Title: Chairman & CEO (2002-2012)
- Board member of: National Petroleum Council
- Spouse: Miriam Mulva
- Children: 2

James Joseph Mulva (born June 19, 1946) is the former chairman and chief executive officer of ConocoPhillips. As announced on July 14, 2011, Mulva retired upon completion of the separation of ConocoPhillips into two stand-alone publicly traded companies.

== Career ==
Mulva served as president and chief executive officer of ConocoPhillips from 2002 to 2004. Prior to that, he served as chairman and chief executive officer of Phillips Petroleum Company from 1999 to 2002. He had served as Phillips' president and chief operating officer since May 1994 and executive vice president since January 1994. He had been senior vice president in 1993 and chief financial officer since 1990, at which time he joined the company's management committee.

Mulva is a member of the National Petroleum Council, which is an oil and natural gas advisory committee to the US Secretary of Energy.

Mulva served as chairman of the American Petroleum Institute in 2005. He was named 2002 Petroleum Executive of the Year in recognition of the aggressive steps he took to grow and position Phillips Petroleum Company to compete in an increasingly difficult business environment.

Mulva earned his bachelor's and master's degrees in business administration from the University of Texas at Austin's McCombs School of Business. Immediately after graduating, Mulva served as a U.S. Navy officer until beginning his career with Phillips in 1973.

Mulva received an honorary Doctor of Engineering degree at the 136th annual commencement ceremony at the Colorado School of Mines on May 14, 2010. At this event, he also gave his keynote address, "Passing the Torch of Responsibility."

== Awards ==
In 2012 at the Golden Goggle Awards, Mulva was the recipient of the Impact Award for his contributions to USA Swimming.
