= Phillips Petroleum Company =

American petroleum company (1917–2002)

- Traded as: NYSE: P
- Industry: Petroleum
- Founded: 13 June 1917
- Founder: Frank Phillips; Lee Phillips
- Defunct: 30 August 2002; 24 years ago
- Fate: Merged with Conoco to form ConocoPhillips in 2002
- Successor: ConocoPhillips; Phillips 66
- Headquarters: Bartlesville, Oklahoma, U.S.
- Area served: North and South America
- Key people: Kenneth Adams; Paul Endacott; William Keeler
- Products: Gasoline, kerosene, fuel oil
- Subsidiaries: Tidewater; General American Oil

Phillips Petroleum Company was an American oil company incorporated in 1917, that expanded into petroleum refining, marketing and transportation, natural gas gathering and the chemicals sectors. It was Phillips Petroleum that first found oil in the North Sea on December 23, 1969, at a position that was later named Ekofisk.

On August 30, 2002, Conoco Inc. merged with Phillips Petroleum to form ConocoPhillips, becoming the third largest integrated energy company and second-largest refining company in the United States. The company moved its headquarters to Houston.

In 2012, ConocoPhillips split into two separate companies. The legacy company kept its name, and spun off the midstream and downstream portions of its business. The new company, which owns the refinery, chemical and pipeline assets formerly held in ConocoPhillips, is named Phillips 66, the brand name and trademark used by the original Phillips Petroleum from 1930 until the 2002 ConocoPhillips merger.

== History ==
The Phillips Petroleum Company was incorporated on June 13, 1917, by brothers Lee Eldas ("L.E.") Phillips and Frank Phillips, of Bartlesville, Oklahoma, United States. Their younger brother, Waite Phillips, was the benefactor of Philmont Scout Ranch. The company was headquartered in Bartlesville, Oklahoma.

Phillips Petroleum rapidly became a fully integrated oil company that included oil and gas production, crude oil pipelines and refineries, and marketing of petroleum products.

Phillips Petroleum became heavily involved in the natural gas industry immediately after the discovery of the Panhandle gas field of Texas and the Hugoton field in Kansas. By 1925, it was the largest producer of natural gas liquids (NGL) in the United States.

In 1927, Phillips started up its first petroleum refinery in Borger, Texas, designed to produce gasoline as an automotive fuel. The refinery also produced other petroleum fractions (e.g., kerosene, fuel oils). It opened its first service station, to sell gasoline, in Wichita, Kansas on 19 November 1927. In 1930, the company developed its "Phillips 66" trademark: according to company lore, a Phillips official was road-testing the company's newest gasoline, commented that the car was going "like 60" when his driver replied "Sixty nothing ... we're doing 66!", all while driving on U.S. Highway 66 in Oklahoma near Tulsa, resulting in the number 66 superimposed on the U.S. Highway symbol for Route 66.

Frank Phillips served as president of the company until 1938. He then turned over the presidency to Kenneth S. "Boots" Adams, but continued as chairman of the board until 1949, when he was 76 years old.

In 1942, the company bought more than 250,000 acres in the Hugoton-Panhandle gas fields and a 25 percent interest in the Panhandle Eastern Pipeline Co. In 1954, the U.S. Supreme Court decided the landmark case of Phillips Petroleum vs. State of Wisconsin which held that under the Natural Gas Act, the federal government should regulate the prices which natural gas producers charge when selling gas at the wellhead. Phillips then divested itself of the Panhandle Eastern Pipeline Interest, but remained a major supplier of natural gas.

World War II greatly stimulated the demand for petroleum products, especially high-octane aviation fuel and jet fuel. Phillips turned to technology to increase the octane rating of fuels for use in advanced engines. The company invented an HF alkylation process in 1940. The American petrochemical industry took off, first making products such as styrene, ethylene, propylene and butadiene. After the war, it formed a subsidiary, Phillips Chemical Co., which entered the fertilizer business by producing anhydrous ammonia from natural gas. The company then built a complex on the Houston Ship Channel devoted to making petrochemicals and polymers.

During the 1960s, Phillips expanded its international operations, particularly with exploration in Canada, Venezuela, and Colombia. It discovered the Ekofisk gas field in the North Sea in 1969.

The 19-storey Phillips Building in Bartlesville opened in 1964. It was designed by Welton Becket & Associates of Los Angeles.

In 1966, Phillips Petroleum bought Tidewater Oil Co.'s West Coast operations and rebranded its "Flying A" outlets to Phillips 66.

In 1983, Phillips Petroleum bought "General American Oil Company", a Delaware company that was headquartered in Dallas. The company was originally built by Algur H. Meadows in 1936 through a merger with oilman J. W. Gilliland and General American Finance System, a company Meadows formed with Ralph Trippett and Henry W. Peters in the early 1930s. General American Oil Company was "one of the largest independent oil companies in the nation, with worldwide operations and interests."

General American was founded in 1928 as a loan company, the General Finance Company, by Meadows, Trippett, and Henry W. Peters, and renamed the General American Oil Company in 1930. The company acquired over 170 oil wells, several refineries and the assets of the General American Finance System and its subsidiaries. By 1959 the company had 2,990 oil wells in fifteen states and Canada and was drilling for oil in Spain. Richard Rainwater became a partner in the company in 1969, as did Howard Hughes. In 1971, Peters acquired a minority stake in Howard Hughes' Hughes Tool Company, to which was later sold in 1972. In 1967 the General American Oil Company merged with its affiliate Premier Petrochemical of Pasadena, Texas.

In late 1984, Mesa Power LP Co., led by T. Boone Pickens Jr., attempted a hostile takeover of Phillips Petroleum. After Mesa failed, Carl Icahn attempted a separate hostile takeover. Phillips remained an independent company but recapitalized with greater debt. This large debt caused Phillips Petroleum to begin selling many of its assets, including refineries, and led to the 2002 merger with Conoco.

Phillips Petroleum Corp. and Chevron Corp. combined their worldwide chemical businesses in 2000 to form a new company, Chevron Phillips Chemical Corp., LLC. This excluded Chevron's oronite additives, which remained with its former parent. Chevron Phillips is headquartered in The Woodlands, Texas.

== Accidents ==
=== 1980 North Sea accident ===
The Alexander L. Kielland, a drilling rig operating in the Ekofisk gas field of the North Sea, capsized on 27 March 1980. The incident killed 123 people. The rig was owned by a Norwegian firm, Stavanger Drilling, and was chartered by Phillips Norway, a subsidiary of Phillips Petroleum Co. Survivors and relatives of the deceased sued Phillips Petroleum Co. for damages in federal court in Ohio, but the trial court dismissed the case, and on appeal to the U.S. Court of Appeals for the Sixth Circuit, the appellate court agreed that Ohio courts had no jurisdiction in the case, even though the defendant did business in the state. The verdict was appealed to the U.S. Supreme Court, which refused to hear the case.

=== Phillips explosion of 1989 ===
The Pasadena site was home to the 1989 Phillips Explosion, which killed 23 employees and contractors and injured 314 after cost-cutting efforts by the company. The initial explosion was equivalent to 2.4 tons of TNT exploding, damaging the homes of residents within a six-mile radius of the refinery. The initial explosion mushroom cloud was visible to area residents within a 15-mile radius of the site.

=== Phillips explosion of 1999 ===
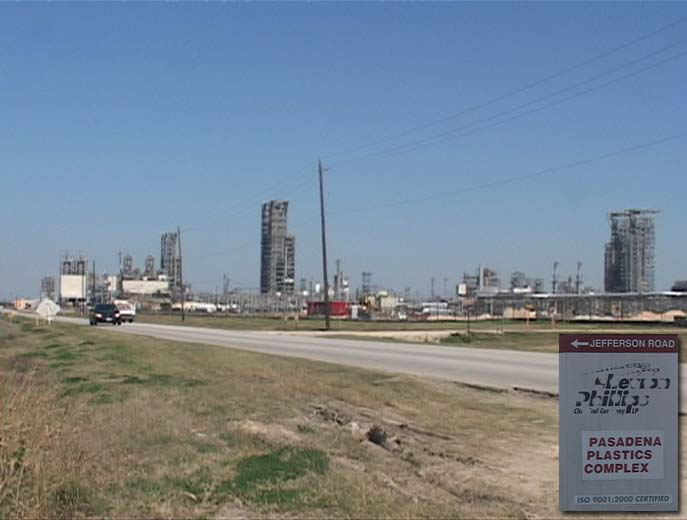
Site of Phillips explosions of 1989, 1999 and 2000 (as photographed in 2008)

Two contractors were killed and three men were injured in an explosion on the morning of Wednesday, 23 June 1999, at Phillips Petroleum Co.'s K-Resin (styrene butadiene copolymer) plant in its chemical complex in Pasadena, Texas. An alarm sounded at 11:30 am when the blast occurred and a fire erupted. It took more than an hour for Phillips' onsite fire department to extinguish the blaze.

Those killed were 24-year-old Juan Martinez and his uncle Jose Inez Rangel, who were performing a hydrostatic test on a pipe until they were burned to death by 500 °F molten plastic. Both Martinez and Rangel were employed by Zachry Construction Corp.

=== Phillips explosion of 2000 ===
The Pasadena facility exploded again in 2000, resulting in one fatality. The explosion was again located in K-Resin plant. Phillips eventually sold off the K-Resin brand to INEOS Styrolution in 2016. Today, the Pasadena facility only manufactures high-density polyethylene (HDPE) This complex employs 750 workers for the production of specialty chemicals, including 150 operations and maintenance personnel.

== Leadership ==
=== Presidents ===
1. Frank F. Phillips, 1917–1939
2. Kenneth S. Adams, 1939–1951
3. Paul Endacott, 1951–1962
4. Stanley F. Learned, 1962–1967
5. William W. Keeler, 1967–1968
6. John M. Houchin, 1968–1973
7. William F. Martin, 1973–1980
8. William C. Douce, 1980–1982
9. Cecil J. Silas, 1982–1985
10. Glenn A. Cox, 1985–1991
11. W. Wayne Allen, 1991–1994
12. James J. Mulva, 1994–2002

=== Chairmen of the Board ===
1. Frank F. Phillips, 1939–1949
2. Kenneth S. Adams, 1951–1968
3. William W. Keeler, 1968–1973
4. John M. Houchin, 1973–1974
5. William F. Martin, 1974–1982
6. William C. Douce, 1982–1985
7. Cecil J. Silas, 1985–1994
8. W. Wayne Allen, 1994–1999
9. James J. Mulva, 1999–2002

== See also ==
- Chevron Phillips
- Phillips 66
- Phillips Disaster of 1989
- Phillips explosion of 2000
- 2001 Humber Refinery explosion
