= Martha Jane Phillips Starr =

Martha Jane Phillips Starr (November 27, 1906- November 14, 2011) was a philanthropist and family and women's rights advocate. Born to Lee Eldas and Lenora “Nodie” Carr Phillips, she married John Wilbur "Twink" Starr in 1929 and moved to Kansas City in 1933. She served as president for the Planned Parenthood of Greater Kansas City and founded the Women's Council at the University of Missouri- Kansas City.

In 2015 she was inducted into the Starr Women's Hall of Fame at the University of Missouri–Kansas City.

== Starr Miniature Collection ==
The Starrs began collecting miniatures in 1936, beginning as sentimental gifts. They consulted with curators and collectors to collection more notable works, and traveled to collections and museums around the world.
