= Humber Refinery =

Oil refinery in North Lincolnshire, England

Humber Refinery South Killingholme Refinery
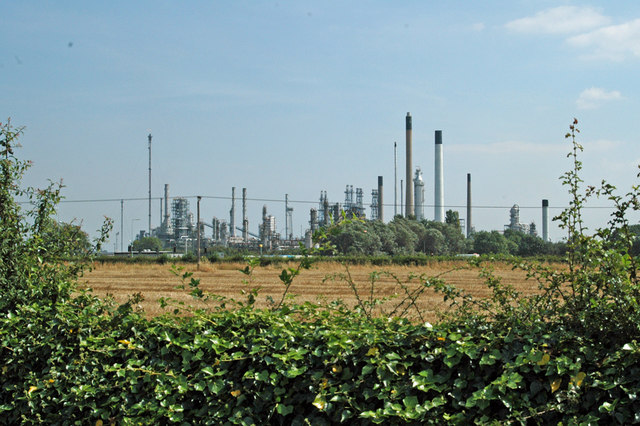
- Refinery from Nicholson Road

- Humber Refinery in Lincolnshire
- Location: South Killingholme, North Lincolnshire, England; 53.633°N 0.252°W

Refinery details
- Owner: Phillips 66
- Opened: December 1969
- Capacity: 221,000 barrels per day (35,100 m^{3}/d)
- Complexity index: 11.8
- No. of employees: 1,100 (including contractors)

The Humber Refinery is a British oil refinery in South Killingholme, North Lincolnshire. It is situated south of the railway line next to the A160; Prax Group's Lindsey Oil Refinery is north of the railway line.

It is situated approximately ten miles north west of Grimsby, and processes approximately 221,000 barrels (35,100 m^{3}) of crude oil per day. It has been owned by Phillips 66 since its spin-off from ConocoPhillips on 1 May 2012.

== History ==
At the time of construction Continental Oil (Conoco) owned the Jet distributor of petrol. Jet was formed in 1953 and was based nearby in Keadby in northern Lincolnshire. In June 1961 Continental Oil bought Jet Petroleum, and its 400 garages. In 1960 Continental had bought the German petrol company Sopi, and its 300 garages.

The refinery was first planned in July 1964, and in August 1964 it was expected to cost £15 million, and to be operational by late 1966.

=== Construction ===
Construction started in August 1966. It was built for Continental Oil (UK) Ltd. It was originally estimated to cost £25 million but cost twice that. It was built by Power-Gas Corporation, a subsidiary of Sheffield-based Davy-Ashmore who had a £22 million contract. It should have been built by November 1968, and the delay in completion was blamed on bad weather in the summer of 1968, and the 1968/9 winter. Davy-Ashmore lost £12 million on the project. The railway sidings were installed by the Ward Group of Sheffield. 75 miles of steel tubing were made by the Corby steel works for £250,000. In September 1967 there were gales across the country and a man was killed on the site when an engineering shed fell on him. In October 1967 there was a strike, and 120 workers in the Constructional Engineers Union were sacked. In January 1968 a 20-year-old worker from Dublin was killed when a 275-ton coke drum, being raised by a twin jib rig onto a gantry, fell 50 feet to the ground, causing the worker to be crushed by a crane.

The £330,000 18-mile underground pipeline from Tetney was made by O'Connor and Davies, part of British Steel Constructions. Six coke silos were built by Sir Robert McAlpine in a £200,000 contract. The sub-sea part of the Tetney pipeline was replaced in 2015.

=== Corporate social responsibility ===
The Humber Refinery has strong community outreach with recent investments of $500,000 in 2009 to the local school Oasis Academy Immingham to encourage engineering and promote STEM. In 2014 a donation of £240,000 was given to build an Enterprise Suite at Killingholme School helping students to learn employability skills. The Refinery was also founder member of BEEP Business Education and Enterprise Partnership that was established in 2011 to strengthen links between business and education offering a range of activities for schools in the Northern Lincolnshire area.

The refinery runs a community liaison group called KAAG (Killingholme Area Advisory Group) they meet monthly and discuss refinery operations and any village concerns. They also organise events for North & South Killingholme, including the free Senior Citizens Christmas Party, Murder Mystery event and sponsor the village children's Christmas party.

=== Environmental ===
The refinery has continually had the lowest emissions of any UK refinery.

In 2005 the refinery dedicated 120 acres of its land to plant a community woodland. Over 67,500 trees were planted and a competition launched to name it. A student at Killingholme School won and it was called Mayflower Wood, reinforcing the local areas links with the Pilgrim Fathers. The woodland is open to the community with permissive rights of way. The Woodland was opened by Prince Andrew, Duke of York KG GCVO ADC.

=== Production ===
It opened in July 1969, producing around 80,000 barrels per day (13,000 m^{3}/d). At the time of its opening Britain was using around 83,000 tons of petroleum coke a year, most of which was imported, and used in aluminium smelting. Much of the crude oil came from Libya, as Continental Oil had large discoveries there, and also in Dubai.

The refinery had its own fire brigade. This was used on 8 August 1972 when there was a fire, with 50 feet flames, and a 49-year-old man from Grimsby was killed.

In the mid-1970s there was a £45 million expansion of the plant to take its processing output to 130,000 barrels per day (21,000 m^{3}/d). At this time, around a third of the oil it processed came from the North Sea. It was the first refinery to receive oil from British National Oil Corporation's (Britoil) Thistle field on 15 April 1978.

In the mid-1990s Conoco invested £500 million in the plant.

== Production ==
Production facilities include an alkylation plant, rotary kilns for petroleum coke manufacturing.

Crude oil arrives by tanker at Tetney in East Lindsey, then is stored at the Tetney oil terminal, before being pumped underground to the refinery for refining.

130,000 barrels (21,000 m^{3}) of petrol are produced per day, most of which is loaded onto tanker lorries at Immingham Dock. 70% of production is for the UK market, the remainder is exported.

700,000 tonnes of petroleum coke are produced each year. A purpose-built warehouse on the docks stores the petroleum coke before it is shipped out.

=== Process units ===
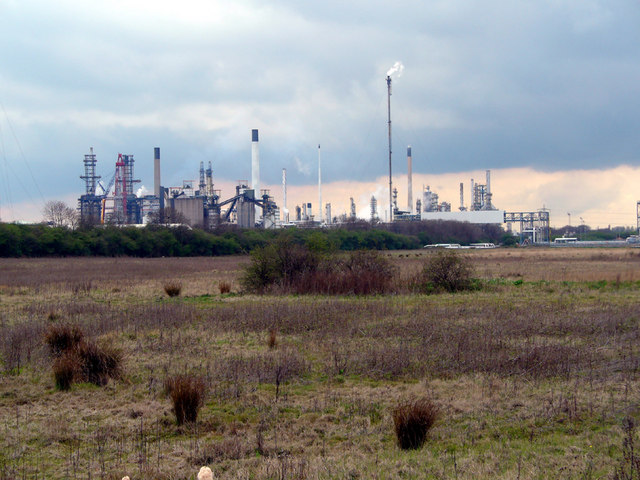
View from the east

- Thermal cracker
- Atmospheric and vacuum distillation
- Two delayed coking units
- Virgin distillate hydrodesulpuriser
- Cracked distillate hydrodeulphuriser
- Heavy gas oil desulphuriser
- Two catalytic reforming units
- Pentane – hexane isomerisation plant
- Aromatics extraction plant
- Toluene dealkylation plant
- Gas recovery plant
- Two sulphur recovery units
- Tail gas treatment unit (Brought online in 2015)
- Fluid catalytic cracker
- Propylene – butylene catalytic polymerisation unit
- Pressure swing absorber for hydrogen recovery
- Cryogenic LPG recovery plant
- Propylene recovery and HF alkylation unit

=== Power station ===
Since 1 November 2004, power for the Humber Refinery has come from the nearby £300 million Combined Heat and Power 734 MWe Immingham Power Station, owned by ConocoPhillips. This was improved to produce 1,180 MW from summer 2009. Next-door to the north are Killingholme A power station and Killingholme B power station. The Immingham Combined Heat & Power Plant (ICHP) was sold to VPI in 2013.

== 2001 Incident ==
In April 2001, a large explosion occurred on the Saturate Gas Plant area of the site. ConocoPhillips was investigated and subsequently fined £895,000 and ordered to pay £218,854 costs by the Health and Safety Executive for failing to effectively monitor the degradation of the refineries' pipework. The company pleaded guilty to these charges in court and has since implemented a Risk Based Inspection programme.

== See also ==
- Theddlethorpe Gas Terminal – owned by ConocoPhillips on the Lincolnshire coast near Mablethorpe
