= Immingham =

Town and civil parish in Lincolnshire, England

Coordinates: 53.6139°N 0.2183°W

- Town and Civil Parish
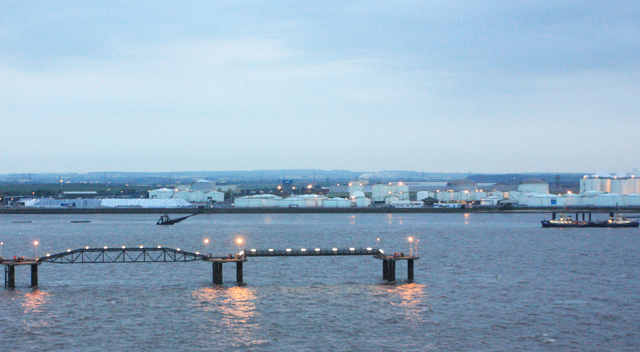
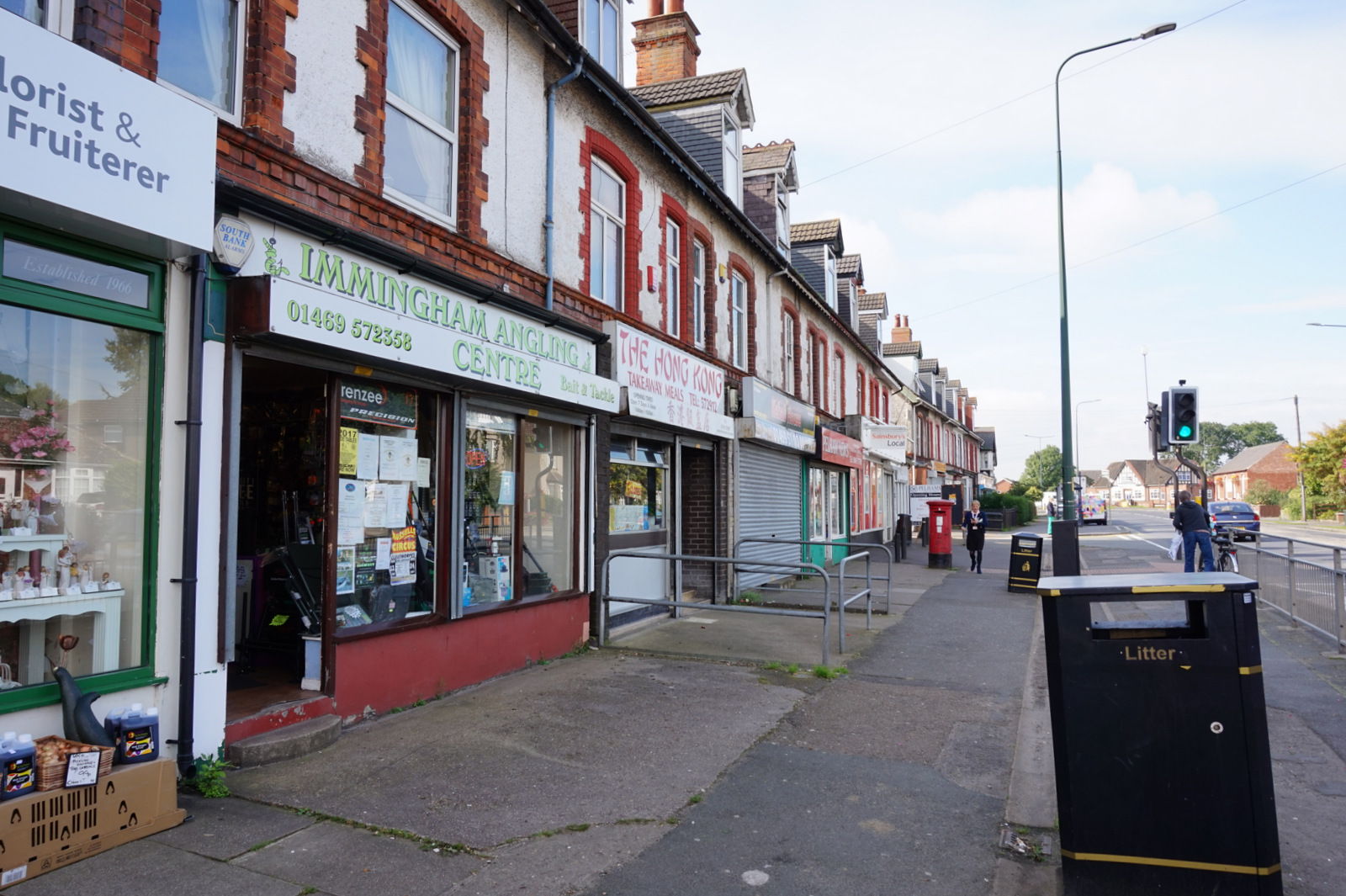
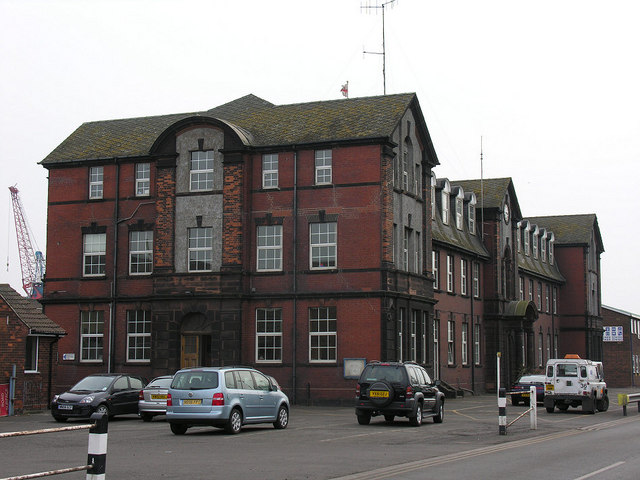
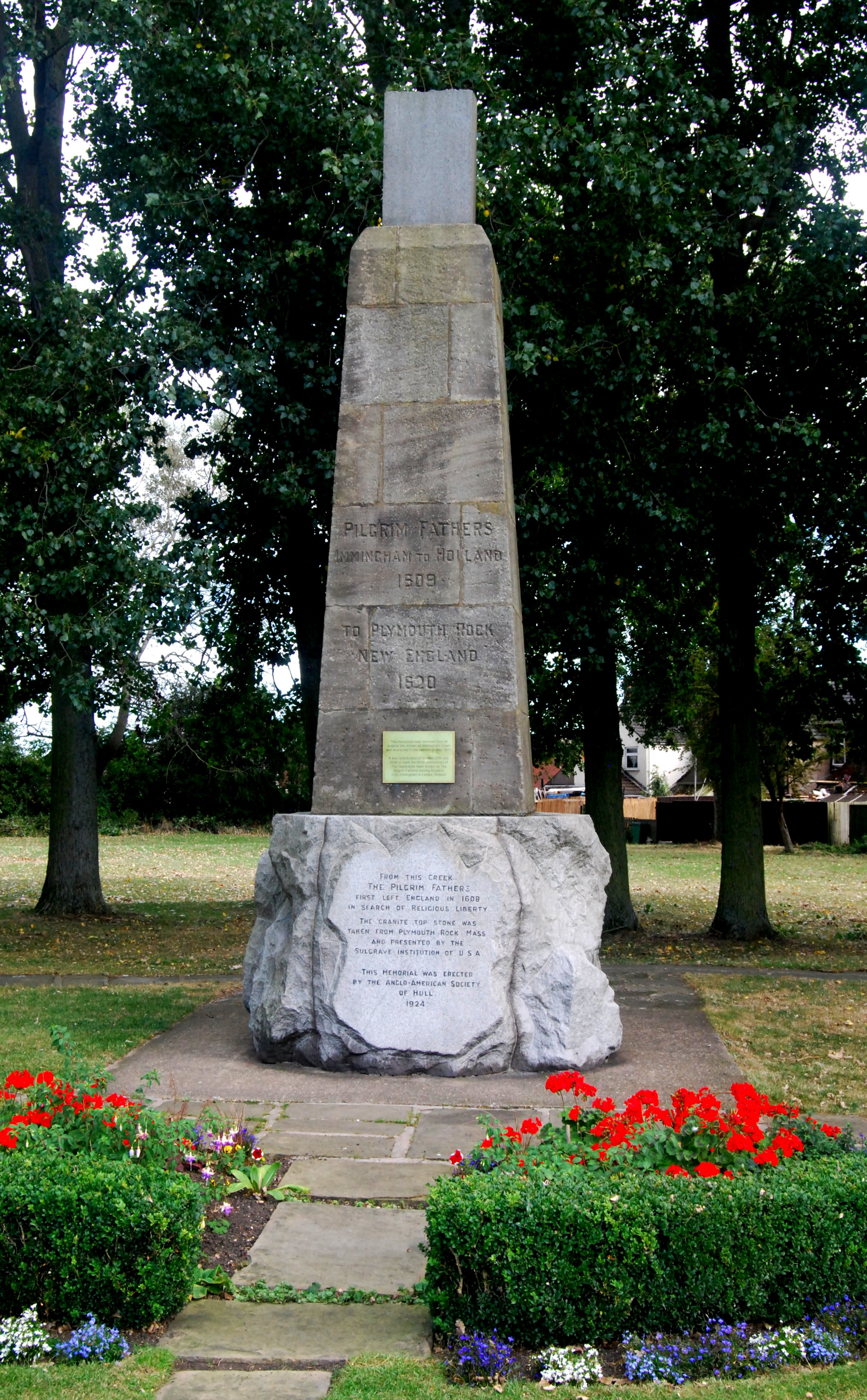
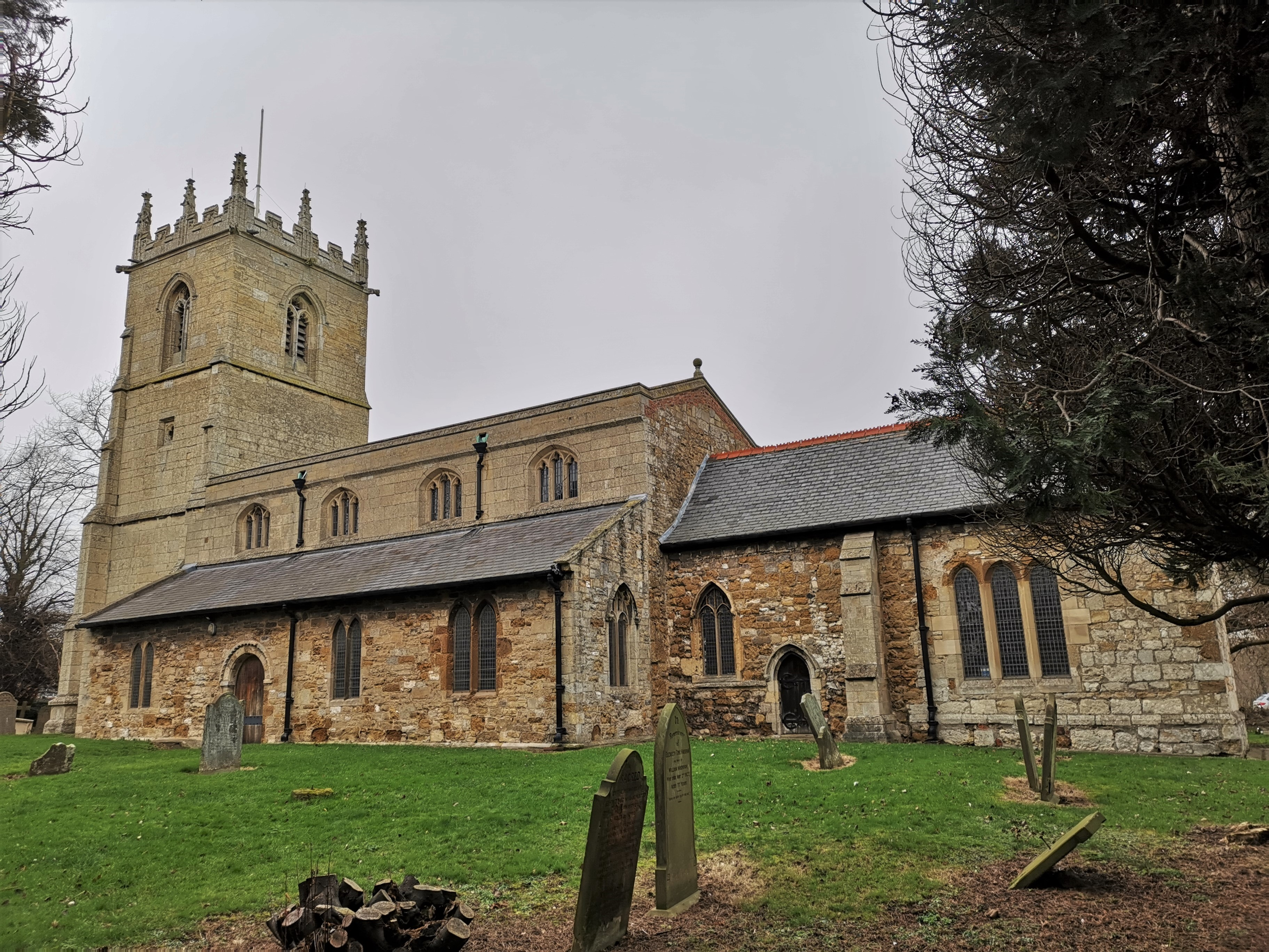
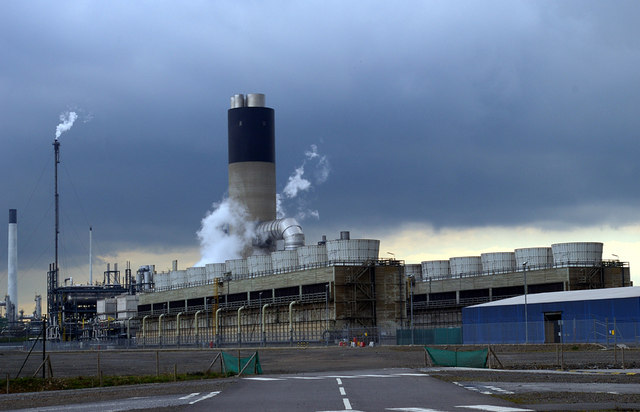
- Port of Immingham Pelham Road The Dock Offices Pilgrims Stone St Andrew’s Church Power Station

- Location within Lincolnshire
- Population: 9,642 (2011 Census)
- OS grid reference: TA178145
  - London: 150 mi (240 km) S
- Unitary authority: North East Lincolnshire
- Ceremonial county: Lincolnshire
- Region: Yorkshire and the Humber
- Country: England
- Sovereign state: United Kingdom
- Post town: IMMINGHAM
- Postcode district: DN40
- Dialling code: 01469
- Police: Humberside
- Fire: Humberside
- Ambulance: East Midlands
- UK Parliament: Brigg and Immingham

Immingham is a port town and civil parish in North East Lincolnshire, England, on the south-west bank of the Humber Estuary, six miles (ten kilometres) northwest of Grimsby.

It was relatively unpopulated until the early 1900s, when the Great Central Railway began developing Immingham Dock; as a consequence of the docks, and post-Second World War large scale industrial developments, Immingham became a significant town during the 20th century. The Port of Immingham & Grimsby was the largest port in the United Kingdom by tonnage with 54 million tonnes of cargo passing through in 2019.

== Geography ==
=== Council ward ===
The Immingham Ward of North East Lincolnshire Council includes Stallingborough, Healing and Habrough. As of 2018, its elected councillors are Stewart Swinburn (Conservative), David Bolton (Labour), and David Watson (Labour).

Population of the ward in 2001 was 11,804 persons (2001 census), and 11,507 persons in 2011 (2011 census).

European route E22 passes through Immingham on the A180 and A160 via Immingham Dock.

=== Civil parish ===
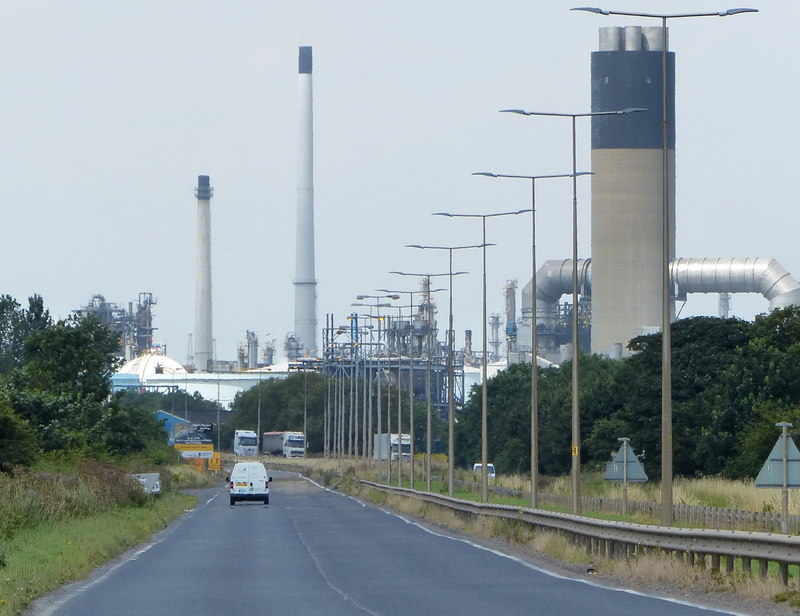
Approaching Immingham on the A180 Road

The civil parish of Immingham is located on the south bank of the Humber Estuary six miles (ten kilometres) west-northwest of Grimsby. The civil parish is bounded by South Killingholme to the north-west, with the drain watercourse outfalling at South Killingholme Haven forming the boundary – also the county boundary between North Lincolnshire and North East Lincolnshire. The south-eastern boundary is with the civil parish of Stallingborough, with the North Beck Drain forming most of the boundary. The parish extends to the south-west as far as Roxton, with boundaries to the south-west and south with the civil parishes of Habrough and Keelby.

The civil parish is low lying, extending from below 5 metres (16 ft) above sea level near the Humber foreshore, to a peak of 21 metres (69 ft) in Roxton wood in the south-west corner. The main features within the parish are the Humber shoreline, running roughly north-west to south-east, the Immingham Dock and estate, and adjacent south of the dock the town of Immingham. The A180 and Stallingborough-Habrough section of the mainline railway west out of Grimsby (Great Grimsby and Sheffield Junction Railway) pass roughly east–west through the southern part of the parish. The A1173 connects the town and dock to the A180. Excluding farms there are no other places of habitation outside the town in the civil parish.

There are two abandoned sites of medieval villages in the parish: that of the village of Immingham, north-west of the modern town, near St Andrew's Church; and Roxton in the southern extremity of the parish.

Population of the civil parish was 9,861 in 2001, and 9,642 in 2011.

=== Town ===
The mayor of Immingham is Kevin Houghton who was elected to follow Stefan Allan, who was elected on 15 May 2019, and then re-elected the following year. Allan currently serves as Houghton's deputy. Before his election as mayor, Allan served as the deputy to preceding mayor and mayoress George Fox, and his wife Veronica Fox.

The town of Immingham is a compact urban area of approximately 1 square mile (2.6 km^{2}), situated south-west of the dock in the middle of the parish. It is bisected by the B1210.

The town has a retail centre, "Kennedy Way", with stores such as Tesco and Aldi, a leisure centre with swimming pool and gym, and several schools.

On the north-eastern outskirts of the town there is a Knauf UK GmbH plant that makes plasterboard.

=== Transport ===
Immingham was formerly served by two railways, the Barton and Immingham Light Railway mainly carrying freight traffic to and from the dock, and the Grimsby and Immingham Electric Railway carrying passengers between the town and the dock. Both were withdrawn by the early 1960s. In the present day, the nearest railway stations are at Habrough and Stallingborough on the former Great Grimsby and Sheffield Junction Railway, now part of the Barton line.

A half-hourly bus service currently operated by Stagecoach East Midlands links Immingham with Grimsby.

== Media ==
Local news and television programmes are provided by BBC Yorkshire and Lincolnshire and ITV Yorkshire. Television signals are received from the Belmont TV transmitter.

Local radio stations are BBC Radio Humberside, Hits Radio East Yorkshire & North Lincolnshire, Hits Radio Lincolnshire broadcasting on DAB and Greatest Hits Radio Yorkshire.

The Grimsby Telegraph is the local newspaper that serves the town.

== History ==
=== Etymology ===
The name Immingham is thought to mean the "Homestead of the people of Imma"; (de)constructed from the elements "Imma" + inga + ham.

The place was referred to as Imungeham in the Domesday Book, and recorded as Immingeham in around 1115.

The termination "-ham" is Anglo-Saxon in origin. The patronymic, (Note: The name "Imma" is found in use both as a male and female name. A Northumbrian aristocrat named Imma appears in Bede's Historia ecclesiastica gentis Anglorum (731 AD); whilst a female Imma is known as the daughter of Charlemagne, spouse to Eginhard (Einhard, 770–840 AD)) (interpreted as "Imming" or "Emming") has been noted as occurring elsewhere, such as in Imminghausen (Immenhausen), or Emmingen (Emmingen-Liptingen) (Germany).

=== Early history ===
Immingham is mentioned (as Imungeham) as a manor in the 11th-century Domesday Book.

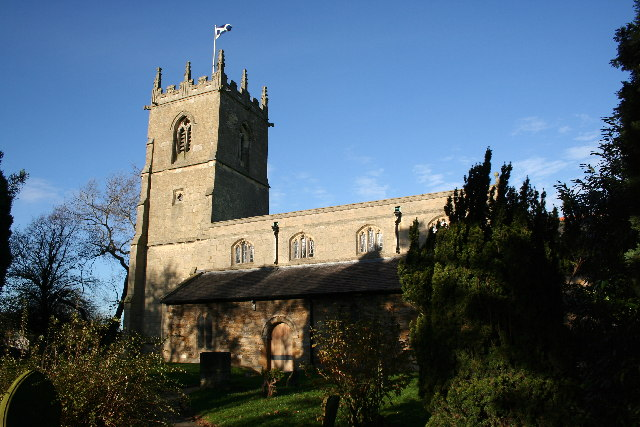
St Andrew's Church

Saint Andrew's church dates to the early medieval period, with much of the structure dating to the 13th century, with parts of the nave as early as the 11th or 12th century. The tower was constructed in the 16th/17th century, to a similar design to that found in nearby Aylesby, Wootton and Healing. The structure was restored in the 1880s and 1920. A decorated octagonal font in the church dates to the 15th C. The remains of a stone cross outside the church also dates to the medieval period. (Note: The earthworks have been partially incorporated into a modern golf course.)

There is archaeological evidence of the medieval settlement. Earthwork remains indicating a settlement and agricultural use exist near south of the church; earthwork remnants of a former shrunken village exist to the north of the church. Archaeological evidence of saltmaking has been found north of the village (formerly in the parish of Harbrough, now within the dock estate), references to a saltmaking site here exist from the Domesday book, and in a late 12th-century document describing the gift of land including the saltpan to Newhouse Abbey.

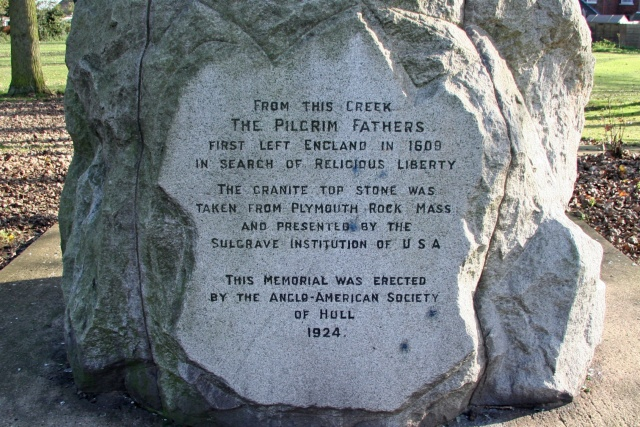
Pilgrim Fathers' memorial

In 1608 the village briefly became a location in the story of the Pilgrim Fathers of America; their vessel was forced to put ashore due to bad weather, sailing up Killingholme Creek; the women of the party were allowed to sleep in the village church for the night, but news of this reached the authorities, with the consequence that the womenfolk were arrested, whilst the others escaped to the Netherlands. A popular protest secured the release of the women, who were then able to rejoin their families, and continue the journey.

In the later medieval period Immingham declined from 66 households in 1523 to 46 in 1723, in common with other Lincolnshire places on or near the Humber banks. The silting of the haven leading from the Humber has been supposed as one possible cause.

Churchfield Manor, in the north-west of the town dates to the late 1600s/early 1700s. Belmont cottage south of the church dates to the early 1800s. Both are now listed structures.

The Ings at Immingham were enclosed in 1840. A coastguard station erected in 1850. The Great Grimsby and Sheffield Junction Railway (opened 1845) passed through the parish south of Immingham.

In the 1870s the parish of Immingham had a population of 237, whilst Roxton was still known as a small hamlet. The parish had an area of 3,195 acres (1,293 ha) which was mostly good grazing land – much of which was owned by the Earl of Yarborough. In addition to the church the village also had Wesleyan and Primitive Methodist chapels.

=== 1900–1950 ===
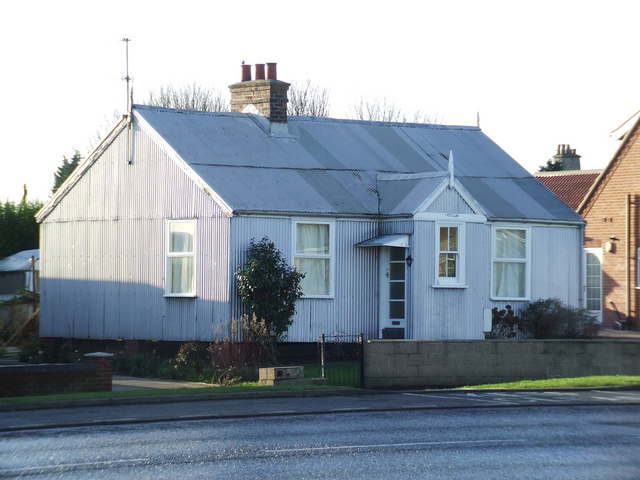
"Tin house" Iron clad housing built 1907. (2009)

Building of the Immingham Dock began in 1906, and it was opened by King George V on 22 July 1912. In part funded by the Great Central Railway, the dock property was 2 1/2 by 1 mile (4.0 by 1.6 km); covering 1,000 acres (405 ha), with 45 acres (18 ha) of water. A railway line to the north-west, the Barton and Immingham Light Railway was opened in 1912. The docks were connected to their primary supply of labour in Grimsby by the Grimsby & Immingham Electric Railway, opened 1912. As part of the development of the new port some wood framed, corrugated iron clad housing was constructed; several of these survived to the 21st century, and one of these dated 1907 is now a listed structure.

During the First World War, Immingham served as a base for British D class submarines. There was also an anti-aircraft battery in the town, manned with 1 pounder and later a 12-pounder gun.

By the 1920s the village of Immingham had been eclipsed in importance by the port; a publication of the Cambridge University Press opined:

Immingham is solely a commercial port; its official title of Immingham Dock describes it. There is no town and only a small population resident in this artificial creation

— R.N. Rudmose Brown, 1928.

By the early 1930s housing development was scattered across several locations: most was along Pelham Road, of which the majority was east of the original village (St Andrew's church), centred around the County Hotel, and close to the dock estate; further development had taken place south and south-east of the church, also on Pelham Road, in two locations each centred on one of the two nonconformist chapels. Almost all the housing was terraced, with the more generous ground plans found moving south-west along Pelham Road. By the mid-1930s the village had grown as much to require a comprehensive school which opened in 1936.

During the Second World War, John Dowland and Leonard Harrison received the George Cross for defusing a bomb that had fallen onto the grain ship SS Kildare in February 1940 in Immingham Dock. Anti-aircraft batteries were located around the dock during the war, as well as at Homestead Park, and near Immingham Grange.

The Humber Force, part of the Home Fleet which had two cruisers and a destroyer flotilla, including HMS Afridi (F07) was based at Immingham during the war, as well as submarines including HMS Seal (N37).

=== 1950–present ===
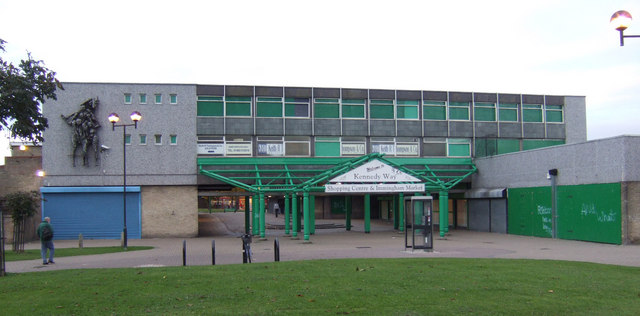
Kennedy Way Shopping Centre (2007)

At the beginning of the 1950s the village of Immingham had little expanded. Development of new industries on the South Humber bank after the Second World War caused further growth of the town. By 1981 the population had risen to 11,506; making it North Lincolnshire's fourth town, after Grimsby, Cleethorpes and Scunthorpe.

The expansion of the village included: Eastfield County Junior School built in 1970; expansion of the comprehensive school, 1973; a shopping centre "Kennedy Way" constructed in 1965–7; and north of the centre 18 blocks of five storey flats constructed by George Wimpey from 1965; a Civic Centre also opened in 1965.

Standard housing also expanded: By 1968 there were many new side streets, in particular a new estate encompassed by Pilgrim Avenue; development along Pelham Road had become almost continuous, and the new village now expanding north-west towards the old Immingham. Further growth took place in the late 1960 and 1970s: north-west of Pelham Road, with the village continuous towards Church Lane; a new estate south-east of Pilgrim Road; as well as further infilling to the south-west.

Immingham Dock Station, originally part of the Barton and Immingham Light Railway closed in 1969, whilst Immingham Museum was established in 1970. (Note: As of 2015 housed in the Civic Centre.) In 1979 the Kennedy Way centre was extended to house a further supermarket and other shop units. The local council added a Sports centre in 1980. The expansion of the new town had peaked by the mid-1980s, with only minor extra expansion in the next two decades to 2006.

In 2007 Immingham School was renamed Oasis Academy Immingham.

Supermarket retailers Somerfield took over a former Kwik Save shop at Kennedy Way c.2006; the branch became part of the Co-op after the takeover of the chain in 2010; in 2014 the Co-op announced it was to close the shop (closed September 2014). Supermarket chain Aldi acquired the site in 2014 with the aim of opening a new store in 2015; the store was opened in May 2015 by the Mayor of Immingham.

The town's Yorkshire Bank closed in August 2009 after 40 years of operation. the Norwich and Peterborough Building Society closed their Immingham office in March 2010; Barclays Bank closed their branch in the centre in late 2010.

In 2012 planning permission was granted for a new large Tesco store to the north of Immingham Civic Centre, (originally consented 2009.), and refurbishment and alterations to the Kennedy Way shopping centre. Preparatory work on a £10 million Tesco supermarket began 2014, with the Immingham Sports Centre to be demolished; a new sports facility was to be provided at Oasis Academy. A 1,988 square feet (184.7 m^{2}) Poundstretcher opened in November 2014 at the development, and B & M store in December 2014. The new "Multi User Games Area" (MUGA) opened March 2015.

In January 2015 Tesco announced cost-cutting plans following falling sales, and halted development of 49 stores, The built but unopened store in Immingham was mothballed, having had its opening previously delayed. As of late 2015 the unopened Tesco supermarket was being retained by Tesco. On 20 September 2018 Tesco opened one of their first Jack's stores in the unused building.

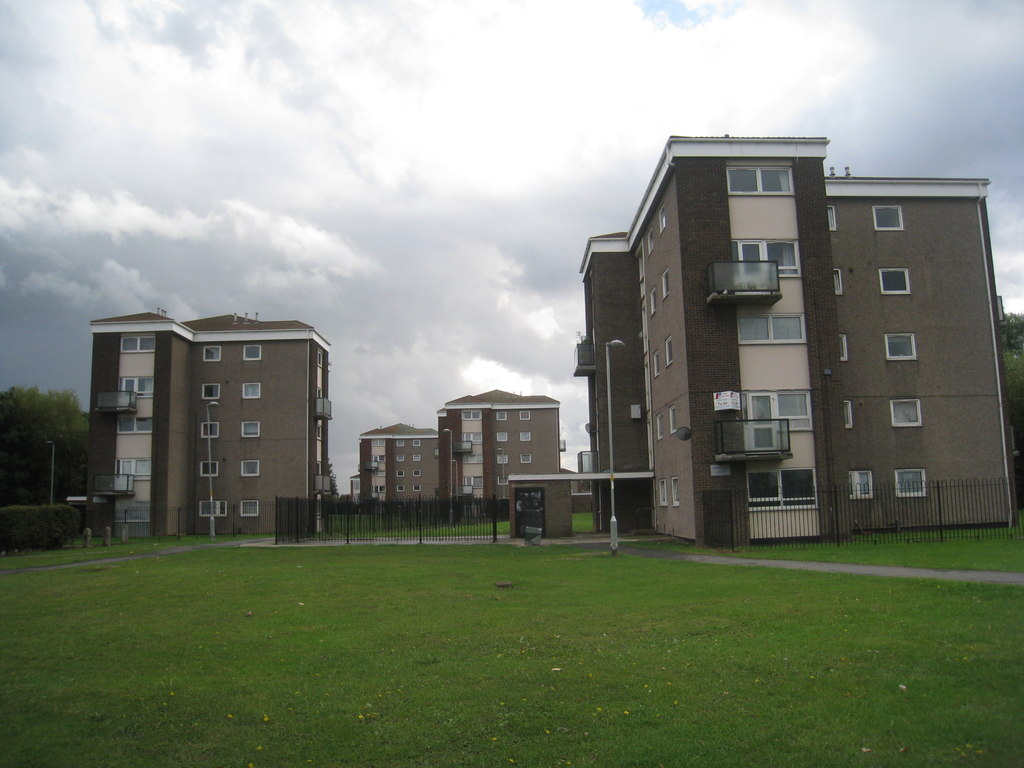
The Washdyke Estate was built by George Wimpey in the 1960s and demolished from 2017 to 2018

In early 2016 work began on the reconstruction of Immingham Civic Centre – an aim was to concentrate public services at one location including Immingham Town Council, North East Lincolnshire Council offices, Humberside Police offices, Shoreline (housing agent) offices, a Library and the Immingham museum, which portrays the role of the Great Central Railway in the building of the docks and construction of the local rail network. The museum, which is home to the Great Central Railway Society archive, is open from 1pm to 4pm, Wednesday to Saturday from March through to November.

== Governance ==
Immingham Town Council

Type
- Type: Town Council

Leadership
- Mayor: Cllr Kevin Houghton
- Town clerk: Andy Hopkins

Structure
- Seats: 15 Councillors
- Labour: 7 / 15
- Independent: 6 / 15
- Conservative: 2 / 15

Elections
- Voting system: Plurality-at-large
- Last election: 7 May 2019
- Next election: 2 May 2023

Meeting place
- Civic Centre, Immingham

Website
- www.immingham-tc.gov.uk

At the lowest level of governance is Immingham Town Council. Immingham has three electoral wards, electing a total of 15 councillors. These councillors are responsible for burial grounds, allotments, play areas and some street lighting. Elections to the town council are held every four years and the most recent elections were held in May 2019. The Mayor of Immingham is elected annually by the members of the town council.

At county level the town is part of North East Lincolnshire Council unitary authority area, having the powers of a non-metropolitan county and district council combined. The town is represented by three Unitary councillors on North East Lincolnshire Council. The county council provides a full range of local government services including Council Tax billing, libraries, social services, processing planning applications, waste collection and disposal, and it is a local education authority.

In the United Kingdom Parliament, Immingham is part of the Brigg and Immingham constituency, represented by Conservative MP, Martin Vickers. The Brigg and Immingham constituency also includes other towns in the area including Barton-upon-Humber.

== Roxton ==
There was once a village at Roxton. The medieval village is evidenced by earthworks, as well a nearby cropmarking to the east. Additionally there may once have been a moated enclosure between Immingham and Roxton, now lost and not visible on modern maps.

== Notable people ==
- Sean Storey, professional snooker player
- Ian Huntley (born 31 January 1974, Grimsby), Soham murderer, lived at Immingham until the mid-1990s.

== See also ==
- Immingham Augustinian Friary
- Industry of the South Humber Bank
- Ming City Rockers
- Port of Grimsby
- Port of Immingham
