= Vitol =

Dutch energy and commodity trading company

- Type: Private
- Industry: Commodity trading; Energy; Oil and gas
- Founded: 1966; 60 years ago Rotterdam, Netherlands
- Founder: Henk Viëtor
- Headquarters: Geneva, Switzerland; Rotterdam, Netherlands
- Number of locations: 40
- Area served: Worldwide
- Key people: Russell Hardy (CEO)
- Products: Crude oil & petroleum products; Natural gas & LNG; Coal; Electric power; Metals; Carbon credits
- Services: Physical commodity trading; Refining & power generation; Terminals & storage; Shipping & chartering; Exploration and production
- Revenue: ▲US$343 billion (2025)
- Net income: ▼US$4.2 billion (2025)
- Total equity: ▼US$29.1 billion (2025)
- Owner: Vitol Holding II S.A.
- Number of employees: ~2,000 (2025)
- Subsidiaries: Petrol Ofisi; VTTI (45%); Varo Energy; VPI Holding; Saras S.p.A.
- Website: www.vitol.com

Vitol (pronounced Vee-Tol) is a Swiss-based Dutch multinational energy and commodity trading company that was founded in Rotterdam in 1966 by Henk Viëtor. Vitol has over 40 offices worldwide, with its largest operations in Geneva, Houston, London, and Singapore.

Vitol maintains secrecy around its business activities. The company, however, does provide some more financial information to its lenders and to a few other entities with which it trades. The company ships more than 350 million tonnes of crude oil per year and controls 250 supertankers and other vessels to move it around the world. On average it handles more than 7.3 million barrels a day of oil and products, roughly equivalent to the daily consumption of Japan, the world's fourth-largest oil consumer after the United States, China, and India.

Vitol is a privately held company by about 400 partners who are current and former employees, who are known for their intense culture of privacy and secrecy. It is reported that Vitol made a payout of $2.9 billion to all its partners in 2021, increasing to $6.4 billion in 2023 and $10.6 billion in 2024.

The company has been involved in multiple controversies related to corruption and bribery. The company bribed Serbian war criminal Arkan for oil contracts, was convicted of grand larceny for circumventing sanctions on Saddam Hussein's regime to buy Iraqi oil, and helped the Iranian regime bypass sanctions. Multiple Vitol oil traders have been convicted on bribery and corruption charges.

== Activities ==
In 2021, Vitol's revenues doubled to around $279 billion, after oil demand spiked after the end of pandemic lockdowns. In 2021, its website stated it traded 7.6 million barrels of crude and other oil products. In 2022, Vitol Group said it would stop trading Russian crude and oil products by the end of that year.

In 2024, it owned and operated five power plants in the UK through VPI, a partially owned subsidiary. In April 2024, it remained the world's largest independent commodity trader. It does not publicly release financial results, but in 2023, it reportedly made $13 billion in net profit, according to the Financial Times. It had made $15.1 billion in 2022, and $4 billion in 2021. In 2024, it had approximately 450 senior partners in London, Geneva, Singapore, and Houston. In 2022, it had shareholder equity of $25.8 billion. In early 2024, Vitol held a 10.4% stake in Saras S.p.A., the owner of the Sarroch refiner plant in Sardinia. That April, Italy's government partly approved Vitol's plan to take over the company for $1.83 billion. State-run GAIL (India) Ltd. signed a 10 year import deal with Vitol in early 2024, for liquefied natural gas.

In January 2025, Vitol acquired Noble Group. Vitol secured one of the first two special licenses issued by the United States, in January 2026, to negotiate sales and to export oil from Venezuela. The company expected to begin its service with delivery of a naphtha, used as a diluent, from the U.S. to Venezuela, at mid-month.

=== Trading ===
In addition to the global crude and product trading businesses, the company trades coal, natural gas, power, ethanol, methanol, gasoline, LNG, LPG, naphtha, bitumen, base oils and carbon credits. In 2023, Vitol was the world's largest independent energy trader. The company confirmed in 2024 that it was expanding into metals, with the CEO calling it a "relatively small addition to our business." It had received net profits over $28 billion over the prior two years. It had previously, in the 1990s, had little success with metals trading when it purchased Euromin.

=== Terminals and infrastructure ===
In total, Vitol has around 16 million cubic meters of storage capacity across the globe.

Vitol (45% stake), along with IFM Investors (45% stake) and Abu Dhabi National Oil Company (10% stake), own VTTI B.V., a storage and terminals business with a capacity of around 8.7 million cubic meters (MCM) in 11 countries: Netherlands (1.328 MCM + 1.118 MCM), Latvia (1.195 MCM), UAE (1.180 MCM), Belgium (0.965 MCM), Malaysia (0.893 MCM), Cyprus (0.544 MCM), USA (0.452 MCM), Argentina (0.218 MCM), Kenya (0.111 MCM), Russia (0.049 MCM), Nigeria (0.016 MCM). MISC Berhad held a 50% stake in VTTI from May 2010 until August 2015. In April 2022, Vitol announced its intention to stop trading Russian petrol by the end of 2022 due to international sanctions during the Russo-Ukrainian War.

In January 2012, Vitol acquired a stake in a subsidiary of the South African shipping firm Grindrod, which gives it access to a coal terminal in Mozambique.

=== Refining ===
In addition to offices in Dubai and Bahrain, Vitol's key strategic asset in the Middle East is the Fujairah Refinery Company Limited (FRCL), which operates an 82,000 barrel per day refinery and a 1,034,000 cubic meter tank farm. FRCL has further development plans in place, which include a 140,000 cubic meter expansion of the tank farm, refurbishment of existing refining units and the installation of additional processing units. Vitol also has invested in refining assets in Bayernoil (Germany), Cressier (Switzerland), Antwerp (Belgium) and Geelong (Australia). In 2018, Vitol bought the 85,000 barrel per day Rotterdam Condensate Splitter from Koch Industries.

=== Exploration and production ===
Vitol, through its wholly owned subsidiaries Arawak Energy Limited and Vitol E&P, has interests in various exploration and production projects worldwide. Arawak Energy is mainly focused on the FSU where it produces oil and gas in Ukraine, Kazakhstan and Azerbaijan, while Vitol E&P holds a portfolio of exploration and development assets along the West African Transform Margin in Ghana and the Ivory Coast. In February 2014, it was reported that Vitol, in concert with the Abu Dhabi Investment Council, had bought the downstream businesses of Shell Australia (excluding aviation) for a total of approximately AU$2.9 billion. The purchase included Shell's Geelong Refinery and its 870-site retail business, along with its bulk fuels, bitumen, chemicals and part of its lubricants businesses in Australia. The business trades as Viva Energy, although the Shell brand remains on many of its retail products. Further, in January 2015, Vitol in collaboration with Eni signed a $7 billion agreement with the government, for the production of oil and gas at Cape Three Points in Western Region of Ghana. The contract is expected to help meet Ghana's burgeoning energy needs. Vitol purchased a 25% share of the Marine XII production block offshore Republic of the Congo in March 2025 from operator ENI, partners include Lukoil of Russia.

=== Aviation ===
Vitol Aviation is focused on Europe, North America and Africa, serving the world’s largest airlines and military customers with 5.7 million tonnes of jet fuel a year.

=== Power ===
In 2013, Vitol invested in its first power plant, VPI Immingham in the UK. The combined heat and power plant (CHP) is one of the largest of its kind in Europe, capable of generating 1,240 MW and up to 930 tonnes of steam per hour which is used by nearby refineries. The gas-fired plant provides approximately 2.5% of UK peak electricity demand.

=== Renewable ===
In 2021, Vitol had 1.2 GW of renewable power generation currently operational, planned & with further investments across the energy spectrum.

== Figures ==
In 2018, Vitol traded:

- Oil: 367 million tonnes of crude oil and product sales
- Natural Gas: over 20 billion cubic meters of physical gas globally
- LPG: 14 million tonnes
- Naphtha: 15 million tonnes
- Gasoline: 1 million barrels of physical gasoline traded per day
- Coal: over 30 million tonnes
- Power: 93 TWh of power sales contracted
- Carbon: 49 mm tonnes of contracted carbon volume
- Methanol: 1.4 million tonnes
- Chemicals: 4 million tonnes (Benzene and Paraxylene)

== Controversies ==
A 2001 article in The Observer stated that in 1995 Vitol had secretly paid US$1 million to Serbian war criminal Arkan to settle a deal with a Serbian Oil company, Orion. Vitol has denied all charges, arguing that no government agency has ever prosecuted the company in this respect.

In 2007, Vitol pleaded guilty to grand larceny in a New York court for paying surcharges to Iraq's national oil company during Saddam's regime and circumventing the UN oil-for-food program. Vitol subsequently paid $17.5 million in restitution for its actions.

According to an article in the Financial Times, Vitol was the company to organise the first controversial sale of Libyan rebel oil to Tesoro Corporation in early April 2011. According to the Financial Times, the company was approached by the Qatari national oil company to sell a cargo of crude oil supplied by the Libyans in exchange for technological supplies and fuel for the National Transitional Council of Libya.

In September 2012, it was alleged that the company had bought and sold Iranian fuel oil, bypassing an EU embargo against Tehran. Vitol bought 2 million barrels using a ship-to-ship transfer off the coast of Malaysia from a National Iranian Tanker Company vessel and sold it to Chinese traders. It was also stated that Vitol is based in Switzerland, which did not implement international sanctions, so Vitol had skirted the charges. In 2013, The Telegraph alleged that the company had been using, for over a decade, an Employee Benefit Trust, avoiding paying income tax for its UK staff.

In 2018, The Dispute Settlement and Sanctions Committee of CRE, the French Energy Regulatory Commission, fined VITOL S.A. €5 million for engaging in market manipulation on the French Southern virtual Gas Trading Point (“PEG Sud”) between 1 June 2013 and 31 March 2014. Vitol appealed this decision, but the French Council of State confirmed the sanction in June 2021.

In 2020, Vitol Inc. agreed to pay a combined total criminal penalty of $135 million to resolve bribery charges with law enforcement authorities in the United States and Brazil. The resolution arises out of Vitol schemes to pay bribes to officials in Brazil, Ecuador and Mexico.

In 2023, both Shell and Vitol were accused by Oleg Ustenko, the economic advisor to the Ukrainian president, of prolonging the war in Ukraine through exploiting a loophole in EU sanctions to bring products derived from Russian oil into Europe, through Turkey. Vitol, in April 2022, had pledged to cease trading Russian origin crude oil and product.

In 2024, a Vitol oil trader was convicted in the United States on corruption charges related to more than $1 million in bribes he paid to officials in Ecuador and Mexico. In January 2026, in the aftermath of the second Donald Trump administration's capture of Venezuelan president Nicolas Maduro and deal with the Venezuelan regime about oil, the first US sale of Venezuelan oil went to Vitol. One of Vitol's senior traders had contributed $5 million to Donald Trump's 2024 re-election campaign and had been at a high-profile meeting at the White House in January 2026 shortly before Vitol got the contract.

== Vitol Asia Pte Ltd ==
Vitol Asia Pte Ltd operates as an energy and commodities company, and offers refining, trading, shipping, and storage of crude oil and energy products.

The company was founded in April 1990 and is headquartered in Singapore. The CEO of this subsidiary has been Mike Muller since 10 September 2019.
