= Andy O'Brien =

Andy or Andrew O'Brien may refer to:

- Andrew O'Brien (politician) (fl. 1990s-2010s), US Department of State official
- Jim O'Brien (rugby, born 1897) (Andrew James O'Brien, 1897–1969), New Zealand rugby footballer
- Andy O'Brien (footballer) (born 1979), Irish footballer
- Andy O'Brien (hurler) (born 1988), Irish hurler
- Andy O'Brien (journalist) (1910–1987), Canadian sports journalist
- Andy O'Brien (politician) (1915–2006), Irish Fine Gael senator

== Fictional ==
- Andy O'Brien (EastEnders), a character in EastEnders
