= Williams Olefins Plant explosion =

2013 explosion in Geismar, Louisiana

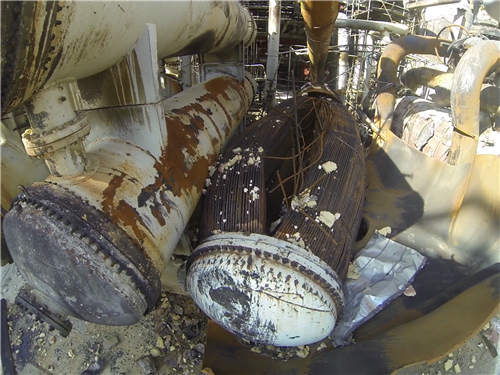
- Post-blast photograph of the heat exchanger which ruptured catastrophically, causing extensive explosion and fire damage to the plant.
- Date: June 13, 2013
- Time: 8.37 am CDT (UTC−05:00)
- Location: William Olefins Inc., 5205 LA 3115, Geismar, Louisiana.; 30.234238°N 91.052937°W
- Deaths: 2
- Injuries: 114
- Location of the Williams Olefins Plant in Louisiana.

The Williams Olefins Plant explosion occurred on June 13, 2013 at a petrochemical plant located in Geismar, an unincorporated and largely industrial area 20 miles (32 km) southeast of Baton Rouge, Louisiana. Two workers were killed and 114 injured. The U.S. Occupational Safety and Health Administration (OSHA) and the U.S. Chemical Safety and Hazard Investigation Board (CSB) launched investigations to determine how and why the heat exchanger failed. The Chemical Safety Board concluded that a standby heat exchanger had filled with hydrocarbons. This heat exchanger was isolated from its pressure relief; shortly after the heat exchanger was heated with hot water, the hydrocarbons flashed to vapor, ruptured the heat exchanger, and exploded.

The effects of the explosion were felt several miles away. A shelter-in-place order was issued to residences and businesses within a two-mile (3.2 km) radius of the plant.

== Background ==
The Williams Olefins Plant was established in 1968 by Allied Chemical and transferred to Williams Olefins following a merger with Union Texas Petroleum in September 1999.

The plant produces ethylene, propylene and other products through steam cracking of ethane and propane. This process uses high temperatures to break long-chain hydrocarbons into shorter-chain olefins. The ethane is diluted with steam and briefly heated in a furnace without the presence of oxygen. Typical reaction temperatures are very high, at around 1,560 °F (850 °C), but the reaction is only allowed to take place very briefly. After the cracking temperature has been reached, the gas is quickly quenched in the heat exchanger to stop the reaction. The plant produces 40,000 tons (36,000 tonnes) of propylene and 650,000 tons (590,000 tonnes) of ethylene every year for use in the plastics industry.

The explosion was the first major incident in the plant's history, although there had been numerous leaks of flammable gases in recent years. On December 18, 2012 workers discovered "a visible leak" of propylene gas. According to a report submitted by Williams Olefins to the Louisiana Department of Environmental Quality (DEQ), 514 pounds (233 kg) of propylene gas escaped. Williams Olefins said, "Piping corrosion under insulation is believed to be a significant factor in this incident [...] This was a small isolated corrosion location that had not been previously found." The Times-Picayune of New Orleans reported that there had been leaks of 100 pounds (45 kg) each of ethylene and volatile organic compounds in 2010, 93 pounds (42 kg) of benzene in 2009, and 4,000 pounds (1,800 kg) of propylene in 2008.

== Explosion ==
The event was investigated by the Chemical Safety Board, and their report pieced together the event. At the Williams Geismar Olefin Plant, propylene was extracted from a stream of hydrocarbon by heating the mixture in one of two reboilers, followed by fractional distillation. The reboilers were of a shell and tube design, with the hydrocarbon stream in the shell side, and hot water in the tubes.

While the reboilers were originally designed to be used concurrently, a modification was performed in 2001 to allow each reboiler to be used independently from the other, allowing a fouled reboiler to be cleaned without shutting the unit down. Valves were installed to isolate each reboiler from the other, and they had the effect of preventing the isolated reboiler from accessing the pressure relief valve at the top of the propylene distillation column.

Reboiler B, that ultimately failed, had been purged with nitrogen and isolated from process with a single closed block valve after maintenance activity in February 2012. Some amount of liquid propane was determined to have entered Reboiler B despite this closed block valve. On June 13, 2013, Reboiler A that was in operation was believed to be fouled, and the operations supervisor intended to start the process (engaging operations and maintenance personnel) to switch to Reboiler B. According to process logs, hot water started flowing into Reboiler B at 8:33 am, and the reboiler exploded 3 minutes later after the hydrocarbon process fluid flashed to vapor, ruptured the shell of the heat exchanger, and ignited.

The explosion killed an operator at the scene, and the operations supervisor died from burns the next day. An additional 167 people on-site were injured and 30,000 lb. of hydrocarbons was released, with the fire lasting for 3.5 hours.

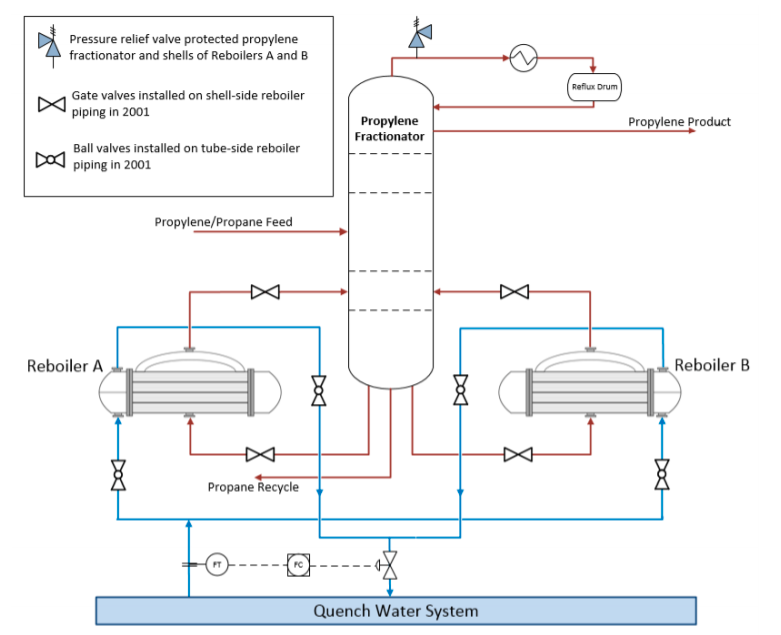
Schematic of the propylene fractionator system that shows how Reboilers A & B are not separately vented to the pressure relief valve. This schematic was originally published in the CSB report.

== Investigations ==
=== Internal investigation ===
On October 3, 2013 Williams Olefins announced the results of their internal investigation. The company said that a rupture in the heat exchanger caused a vapor cloud "which was ignited by an unknown source, causing the explosion."

=== OSHA investigation ===
On December 11, 2013 OSHA cited Williams Olefins for six Process Safety Management standard violations, including one willful, and fined the company $99,000. Dorinda Folse, OSHA's Baton Rouge area director, said: "Williams Olefins violated safety and health standards which, when followed, can protect workers from hazardous chemicals. It is the employer's responsibility to find and fix workplace safety violations and to ensure the safety of its workers. Failing to do so cost two workers their lives." The five serious violations, where there was "substantial probability that death or serious physical harm could result from a hazard about which the employer knew or should have known", were:

- inadvertently mixing hot quench water with propylene
- failing to provide appropriate pressure protection for a pressure vessel
- failing to complete a process hazard analysis to address the opening of hot quench water flow into a pressure vessel
- failing to properly document workplace training
- failing to promptly correct deficiencies related to process safety management discovered by an internal compliance audit team

The willful violation—defined as one "committed with intentional, knowing or voluntary disregard for the law's requirements, or with plain indifference to worker safety and health"—was the company's failure to develop clear, written procedures for how to change and put idle pressure vessels into service.

=== Chemical Safety Board investigation ===
The Chemical Safety Board issued a detailed report, and some of the key lessons include:

- Overpressure protection is critical to protect pressure vessels from rupture.
- Valves can leak or be operated inadvertently, as opposed to pipe blinds.
- The importance of a robust safety culture, and the use of tools such as process hazard analyses (PHAs), management of change reviews (MOCs), and pre-startup safety reviews (PSSRs) at identifying potential hazards, evaluating their potential effects, effectively addressing them, followed by verification.

== Lawsuits ==
In the first civil trial regarding the explosion, four workers filed suit against Williams Olefins LLC and parent company Williams Companies, Inc. for their alleged negligence. They were awarded a total of 16 million dollars. One man, who suffered severe back and leg injuries, was awarded $10 million, one was awarded $3.5 million and two more received around half a million dollars each.

In a settlement for Clean Air Act violations, the government settled for $750,000, treating "three of the alleged violations as single-day violations". This minimized the statutory fine. The court viewed this as potentially merely a 'slap on the wrist'.

== See also ==
- 2010 Tesoro Anacortes Refinery disaster
- List of disasters in the United States by death toll
