= Texas City explosion =

Texas City explosion may refer to:

- Texas City disaster (1947), an industrial accident
- Texas City refinery explosion (2005), an oil refinery fire
