= Blowdown =

Blowdown or Blowing down may refer to:

- Windthrow or forest blowdown, a felling of trees by windstorm
- Blowdown stack, a vertical containment structure at a refinery or chemical plant
- Blowdown, a process plant controlled or emergency depressurization
- Boiler blowdown, a steam-boiler process to remove impurities
- Blowdown, a television series focusing on explosive demolition
- Diving bell or hyperbaric chamber blowdown (diving), the compression of the pressurised chamber atmosphere, or displacement of ambient pressure water by adding high pressure gas through a blowdown valve.
- in mathematics, the inverse of blowing up
- "Blowing Down", song from the Digable Planets studio album Blowout Comb
