= Cui =

Cui or CUI may refer to:

== People ==
- Cui (surname), a Chinese surname
- Cui Shian (born 1957), governor of Macau
- César Cui (1835–1918), Russian composer

== Education ==
- Catholic University of Ireland
- COMSATS University Islamabad
- Concordia University Irvine

== Science and technology ==
- Character-based user interface
- Copper(I) iodide (CuI)
- Corrosion under insulation
- Cubic inch, a unit of volume
- CUI Devices, an electronic components manufacturer
- Hamburg Centre for Ultrafast Imaging, a German research institute

== Other uses ==
- Cui (character), a character in Dragon Ball media
- Controlled Unclassified Information, in the United States
- Cuiba language
- Cui-ui, a fish endemic to Pyramid Lake in northwestern Nevada
- Cui (or cuy), a Peruvian term for the guinea pig, when used as food

== See also ==
- Cui bono, "To whose benefit?", a Latin adage used to suggest a hidden motive
- Choi (Korean version of the Chinese surname Cui)
