= Honeywell UOP =

American petroleum technology company

- Company type: Subsidiary
- Industry: Engineering
- Predecessor: Universal Oil Products; National Hydrocarbon Company
- Founded: 1914; 112 years ago
- Headquarters: Des Plaines, Illinois, United States
- Number of locations: 30
- Key people: Rajesh Gattupalli (President)
- Products: Catalysts; Adsorbents; Process Technology
- Number of employees: 5000
- Parent: Honeywell
- Website: www.uop.com

Honeywell UOP, formerly known as UOP LLC or Universal Oil Products, is an American multi-national company developing and delivering technology to the petroleum refining, gas processing, petrochemical production, and major manufacturing industries.

The company's roots date back to 1914, when the revolutionary Dubbs thermal cracking process created the technological foundation for today's modern refining industry. In the ensuing decades, UOP engineers generated thousands of patents, leading to important advances in process technology, profitability consultation, and equipment design.

== History ==
UOP was founded in 1914 to exploit the market potential of patents held by inventors Jesse A. Dubbs and his son, Carbon Petroleum (C. P.) Dubbs. Perhaps because he was born in Pennsylvania oil country, Jesse Dubbs was enamored with the oil business. He even named his son Carbon after one of the elemental constituents of oil. Later, Carbon added the P. to make his name "euphonious," he said. People started calling him "Petroleum" for fun, and the name stuck. C. P.'s son and grandson were also named Carbon, but each had a different middle initial.

When founded in 1914 it was a privately held firm known as the National Hydrocarbon Company. J. Ogden Armour provided initial seed money and kept the firm going the first years it lost money. Most of the losses were incurred during lengthy legal battles with petroleum firms that were using technology patented by Dubbs.

In 1919 the firm's name became Universal Oil Products.

By 1931, petroleum firms saw a possible competitive advantage to owning UOP. A consortium of firms banded together to purchase the firm. These firms were Shell Oil Company, Standard Oil Company of California, Standard Oil Company of Indiana, Standard Oil Company of New Jersey, The Texas Company, and N. V. de Bataafsche Petroleum Maatschappij. This worried oil firms that were not part of the group and it helped prompt the Justice Department to begin an investigation of this arrangement as a possible violation of antitrust laws.

The oil firms placed the assets of UOP into a trust to support the American Chemical Society (ACS). In 1959 UOP went public and the income from that sale still provides monies to ACS to administer grants to universities worldwide.

In the 1970s UOP was acquired by The Signal Companies, which merged with Allied Corporation in 1985, becoming AlliedSignal.

In August 1988 Union Carbide Corporation and AlliedSignal formed a joint venture combining the latter's wholly owned subsidiary, UOP Inc., and the Catalyst, Adsorbents and Process Systems (CAPS) business of Union Carbide.

AlliedSignal acquired Honeywell in 1999 and assumed the latter's name. In 2005, what was now known as Honeywell acquired Union Carbide's stake in UOP, making it again a wholly owned subsidiary. The reported payment to Union Carbide was $835 million, valuing UOP at $1.6 billion.

== Facilities ==
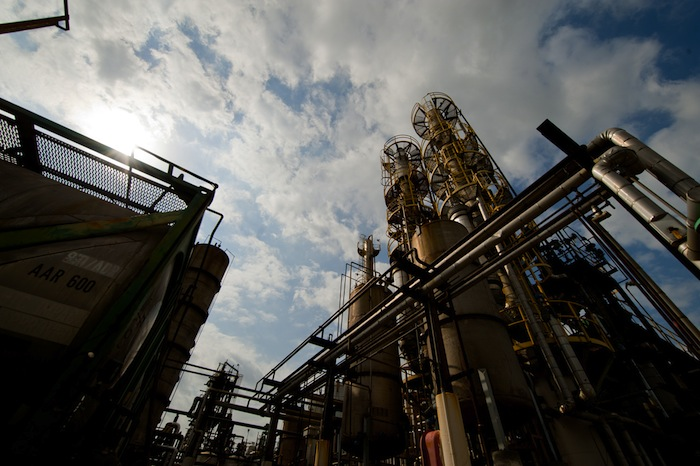
A Honeywell refinery producing green diesel from natural oils in Pasadena, Texas.

The UOP Riverside research and development laboratory in McCook, Illinois was conceived in 1921 by Hiram J. Halle, the chief executive officer of Universal Oil Products (now simply UOP), as a focal point where the best and brightest scientists could create new products and provide scientific support for the oil refining industry. Between 1921 and 1955, Riverside research resulted in 8,790 U.S. and foreign patents and provided the foundation on which UOP built its success.

The company benefited immensely by the addition to its research staff of Professor Vladimir Ipatieff, famous Russian scientist known internationally for his work in high-pressure catalysis. His contribution in catalytic chemistry gave UOP a position of leadership in the development of catalysis as applied to petroleum processing, the first being catalytic polymerization. Vladimir Haensel, a student of Ipatieff’s, joined UOP and developed Platforming in the 1950s. This process used very small amounts of platinum as a catalyst for the high yield of high-octane gasoline from petroleum-based feeds.

In 1963 Universal Oil Products purchased a chemical plant in East Rutherford, New Jersey. The plant was used for solvent recovery operations from waste chemicals. Operations ended in 1979, and ownership of the site was retained by Honeywell. Some of the chemical operations had contaminated adjacent soils, groundwater and waterways in the New Jersey Meadowlands. The New Jersey Department of Environmental Protection and the U.S. Environmental Protection Agency (EPA) ordered cleanup of the plant site, and in 1983 EPA designated the plant as a Superfund site. Honeywell signed agreements and orders to cooperate with EPA in the cleanup operations. As of 2023, several stages of the cleanup have been completed. Remediation of the adjoining wetlands and plans for long-term site maintenance are pending.

The Riverside facility was recognized as a National Historic Chemical Landmark by the American Chemical Society in 1995.

== Technologies ==
=== Adsorption separation technology ===
Distillation is the most common way to separate chemicals with different boiling points. The greater the difference in boiling points, the easier it is to do. However, when boiling points are too similar, this isn't feasible. Adsorption separation might be possible. In adsorption separation, a mixture of chemicals flows past a porous solid called the adsorbent and some chemicals tend to "hang out" longer. A valid analogy is to imagine a busy street with people walking in the same direction past great places to eat. The hungriest people will tend to stop right away. The people that were pretty full will make it far down the street. Now imagine flooding the whole town with water and everyone runs out where you can collect them according to how hungry they were. In technical terms the liquid flush is called the desorbent.

This type of separation was first commonly used in the laboratory to separate small test samples. UOP pioneered a method of separating large volumes of chemicals. They call the counter-current embodiment of it the Sorbex family of processes. These are the major ones designed by UOP:

Parex: separation of para-xylene from a mixture of xylene isomers
MX Sorbex: separation of meta-xylene from a mixed of xylene isomers
Molex: linear paraffins from branched and cyclic hydrocarbons
Olex: olefins from paraffins
Cresex: para-cresol or meta-cresol from other cresol isomers
Cymex: para-cymene or meta-cymene from other cymene isomers
Sarex: fructose from mixed sugars

=== Renewable fuels technology ===
In 2008, UOP revealed its Ecofining process which takes vegetable oils, or lipids, and converts them into replacements for diesel and jet fuels. The resultant fuels from this refining process are indistinguishable from existing fossil-based petro-diesels and jet fuels.

=== Catalytic converter ===
Most of UOP's work is not known to the general public since most applications are within refineries and petrochemical plants. However, one technology UOP helped develop is familiar to automobile owners. During the 1970s, UOP worked on pioneering a combined muffler catalytic converter. To help publicize their work they sponsored CanAm and Formula One teams. The race cars used were developed by Shadow Racing Cars. Many race fans were drawn to the team's innovative designs and underdog status. UOP finally achieved a goal when California adopted the catalytic converter after the UOP governmental relations rep, Donald Gazzaniga, helped push legislation through the state Senate and Assembly.

== See also ==
- Catalytic reforming
- Penex
