= Gorilla Project =

The Gorilla Project refers to a former plan for construction of the first major oil refinery in the United States in over 30 years. In 2008, Hyperion Resources Inc., a Dallas-based energy company, had considered placing the 2,000-acre (810 ha), 400,000-barrel-per-day (64,000 m^{3}/d) capacity refinery near Elk Point, South Dakota and approximately 10 miles (16 km) away from Vermillion, among three other potential locations. Construction was originally intended to begin in 2008, but was progressively delayed. The state construction permit expired on March 15, 2013.

The facility, which would process 400,000 barrels (64,000 m^{3}) of oil a day and use 12 million US gallons (45,000 m^{3}) of water daily from the Missouri River, caused significant controversy among concerned residents of Elk Point and the surrounding area. Prior to the announcement, the project and the company behind it were kept under considerable secrecy. It was known only as "Project Gorilla" while real estate agents made several purchase agreements on land north and east of Elk Point. Jeff Martin, a newspaper editor at the Argus Leader in Sioux Falls, uncovered two domain names, hyperionelkpoint.com and hyperionsd.com, which led to a news story that identified Hyperion for the first time. Elk Point is the forerunner among three other out-of-state locations Hyperion is considering for the refinery.

Opponents are concerned about air, water, and noise pollution; environmental degradation of nearby food crops such as soy beans, corn, and alfalfa; negative effects on the ethanol fuel market and competition with local ethanol-producing farmers; the displacement of thousands of local residents and negative population resettling; potential industrial disasters including explosions, leaks, and spills, reminiscent of the recent explosion at a similar-capacity Texas City Oil Refinery that caused the deaths of 15 workers and injured over 100; contamination and overuse of important water resources from the Missouri River; potential threats of terrorism; and concerns of the sheer size of the facility, which will be over twice the area of Elk Point.

In 2012 Hyperion allowed its development options on 5,000 acres of land in Union County to expire. Infrastructure to supply the refinery did not exist, financing had become difficult, demand had fallen, and with the delay of the Keystone XL pipeline, the feedstock to the proposed refinery would not have been available.
