= Hazardous Material Emergency Alarm System =

Hazardous Material Emergency Alarm Systems (HMEAS) are stand-alone systems for protecting people from exposure to dangerous substances in the workplace.

== Overview ==
HMEAS are designed for a wide variety of commercial and industrial environments, including refineries, industrial processes and warehousing, educational and commercial research facilities as well as hospitals and even restaurants. The systems are designed to both alert and respond – activating warnings and alarms and depending on the extent of the danger, triggering corrective actions that could include material shutoffs, increased ventilation and the opening or closing of access to the exposed area.

Hazardous Material Emergency Alarm Systems (HMEAS) should be designed to meet the safety requirements embodied in the Building and Fire Codes used throughout North America and Europe,
