= DZR =

DZR is a 3-letter acronym that may refer to:

- Daniel Z. Romualdez Airport, also known as DZR Airport, in Tacloban City, Philippines
- Danzan-ryū, a school of jujutsu founded by Henry Seishiro Okazaki
- Deutsche Zeppelin Reederei, a zeppelin airline (1935–1940) and a modern zeppelin tour company (2001–present)
- Dezincification Resistant Brass, an alloy used to make pipe fittings for use with potable water
