= Penex =

Continuous catalytic process used in the refining of cruel oil

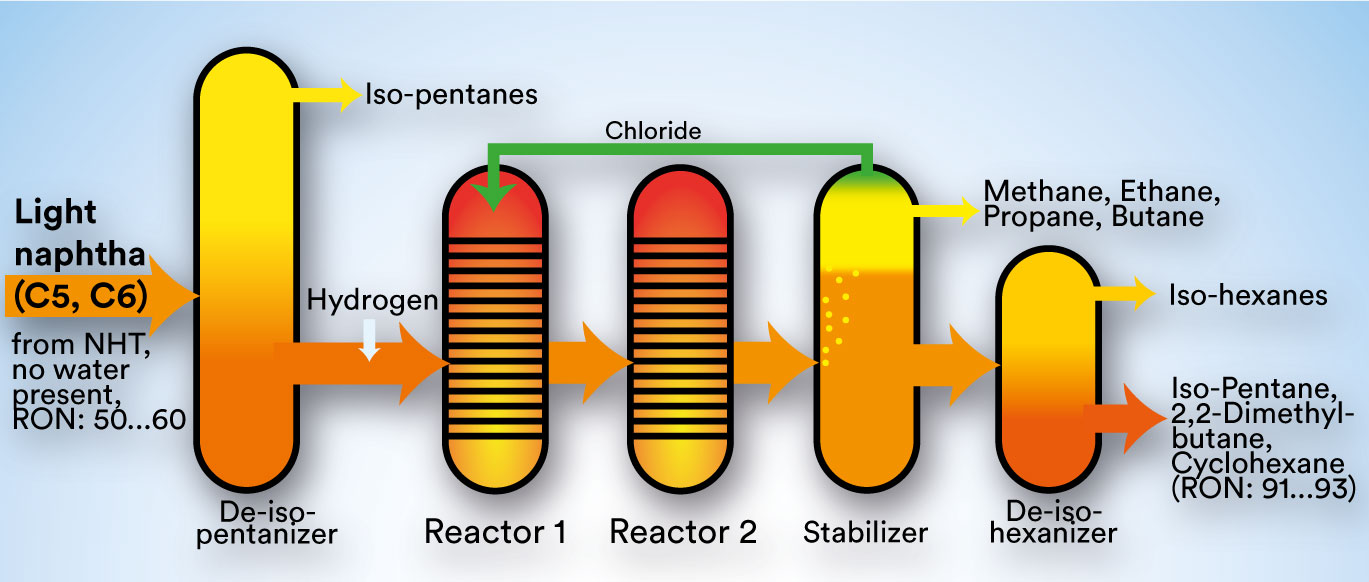
Penex unit (simplified)

The Penex process is a continuous catalytic process used in the refining of crude oil. It isomerizes light naphtha (C_{5}/C_{6}) into higher-octane, branched C_{5}/C_{6} molecules. It also reduces the concentration of benzene in the gasoline pool. It was first used commercially in 1958. Ideally, the isomerization catalyst converts normal pentane (nC5) to isopentane (iC5) and normal hexane (nC6) to 2,2- and 2,3-dimethylbutane. The thermodynamic equilibrium is more favorable at low temperature.

== Background ==
In the petroleum industry, much research has been done on the upgrading of light hydrocarbons. The realisation that normal pentane is one of the most important remaining components of naphtha that can be easily upgraded prompted Phillips Petroleum to investigate the various processes for converting normal (linear) pentane into (branched) isopentane. The decisive factor in the isomerisation of normal pentane is an increase in the total octane number. This improvement in quality makes the result more valuable for blending with today's high-octane fuels. In addition, like other isoparaffins, isopentane has a low sensitivity (research octane minus engine octane) which means improved performance at street octane. Increasing the octane number also allows larger quantities of pentanes to be blended into premium petrol.

In a refinery, light naphtha can come from the distillation column ("straight-run naphtha") or from other processes, for example the cracking units.

== Process ==
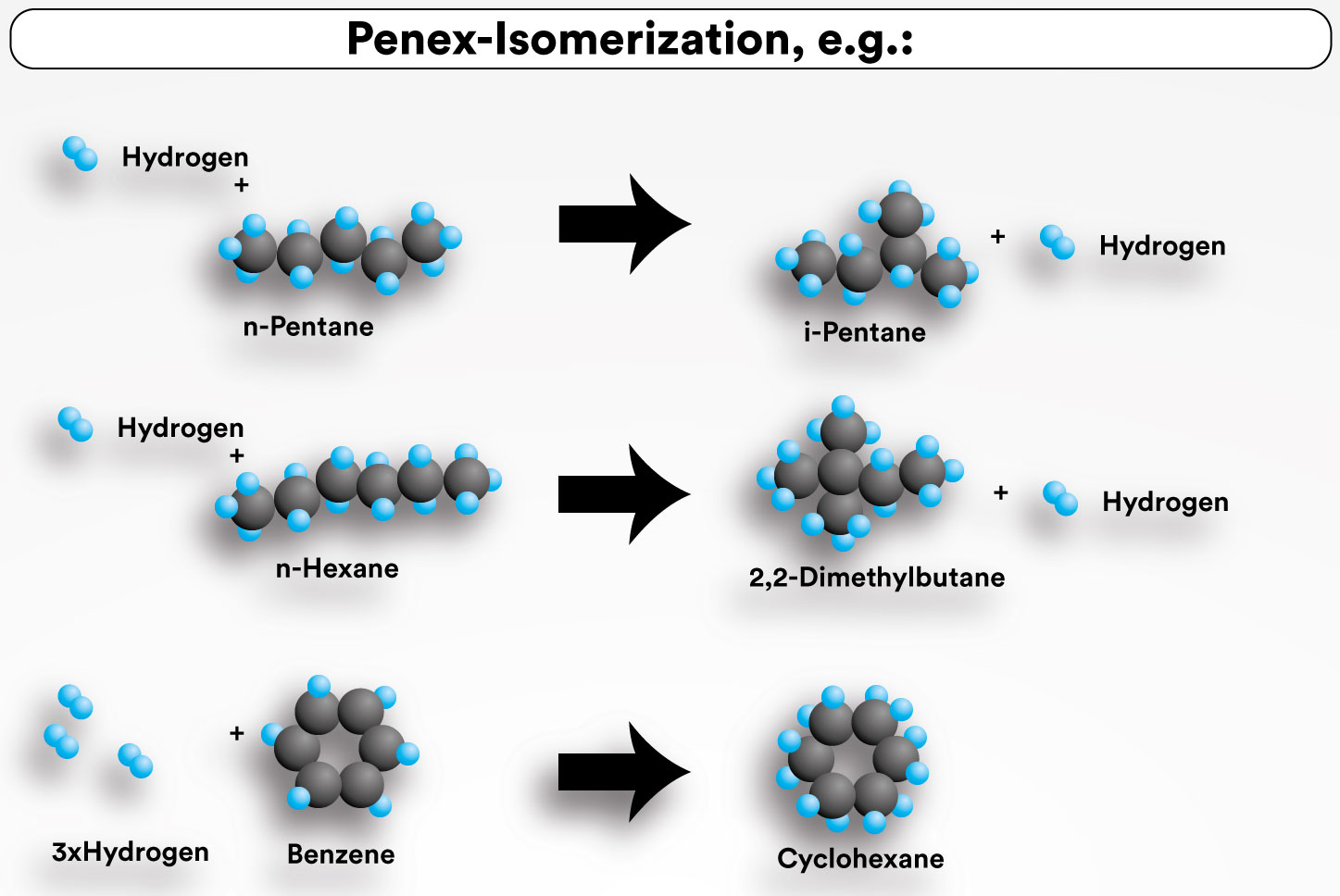
UOP Penex process

During isomerisation, the low-octane normal hydrocarbons are converted into their higher-octane isomers. For this purpose, the feed material is passed over a fixed bed catalyst in the presence of hydrogen. The hydrogen is continuously circulated in the reactor circuit. The Penex process uses fixed-bed catalysts containing chlorides.

As this is an equilibrium reaction, 100% conversion of the normal isomers is not achieved. The maximum octane number of the product is achieved by separating the unconverted normals using a molecular sieve (Molex technology) and returning them to the reactor.

== Results ==
A single pass of feedstock with an octane rating of 50-60 through such a bed typically produces an end product rated at 82-86. If the feedstock is subsequently passed through a DIH (deisohexanizer) column, the end product typically has an octane rating of 87-90.5. If the feedstock is subsequently passed through a Molex-technology column, the end product typically has an octane rating of 88-91. If the feedstock is first passed through a DIP (deisopentanizer) column to remove iso-pentanes, then through the Penex bed, and subsequently through the DIH column, the end product typically has an octane rating of 91-93.

== Field use ==
The Penex Process is licensed by the UOP corporation and currently utilized at more than 120 units at petroleum refineries and natural gas liquids plants throughout the world.
