= 2010 Tesoro Anacortes Refinery disaster =

Explosion in Anacortes, Washington state, U.S.

Tesoro Anacortes Refinery disaster
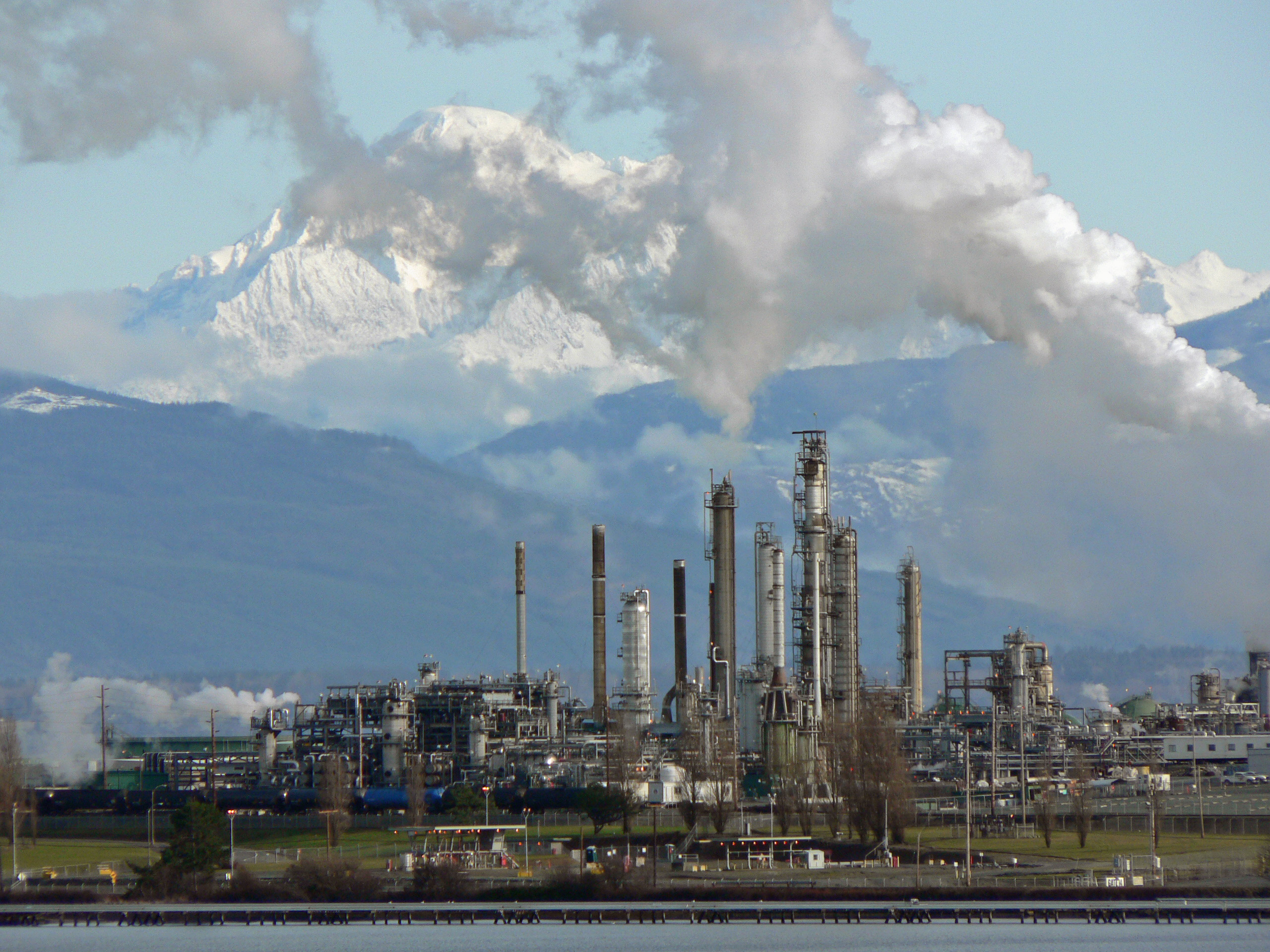
- The Tesoro Anacortes Refinery
- Date: 2 April 2010
- Time: 00:30 PDT
- Location: Tesoro Anacortes Refinery, Anacortes, Washington; 48.493°N 122.565°W
- Cause: rupture of a heat exchanger
- Deaths: 7
- Injuries: 1

The 2010 Tesoro Anacortes Refinery disaster was an industrial accident that occurred at the Tesoro Anacortes Refinery in Anacortes, Washington on April 2, 2010. Seven workers received fatal burns in an explosion and ensuing fire when a heat exchanger violently ruptured after a maintenance restart.

== Explosion ==
At 12:30 a.m. on April 2, while personnel were performing post-maintenance heat exchanger restart operations, a heat exchanger on an adjacent bank catastrophically and violently ruptured. The pressure-containing shell of the heat exchanger burst at its weld seams, expelling a large volume of very hot hydrogen and naphtha, which spontaneously ignited upon contact with the surrounding air. The ensuing explosion was so violent that many in Anacortes felt the shock wave across Fidalgo Bay. A giant fireball lit up the sky above the refinery, and a plume of black smoke was pushed toward the town by a southeast wind. It took about 90 minutes to put the fire out.

== Aftermath ==
The families of the victims and an injured contractor filed a lawsuit against Tesoro. The lawsuit was settled for $39 million, but as of 2020 the company continued to fight a fine and government accusations that it willfully put its workers in harm's way.

The Tesoro refinery had been fined $85,700 in 2009 for 17 "serious" safety violations — meaning there was a risk of "death or serious physical injury" from each violation. Those fines were later reduced to three violations and a $12,250 settlement.

According to the final report released by the CSB, the explosion was caused by high temperature hydrogen attack (HTHA), which severely cracked and weakened carbon steel tubing and led to the rupture. As a result, the CSB recommended the state adopt more rigorous process safety management attributes and features based on the team's regulatory analysis. The Nelson curve for carbon steel was also reduced, prohibiting the use of the material in processes that operate in temperatures above 400 °F (204 °C).

The accident was the state's worst industrial disaster in 50 years. A similar incident occurred in November 1998, when six men were killed in explosion at the Equilon Puget Sound Refinery in Anacortes.

== See also ==
- Williams Olefins Plant explosion
