= Green diesel =

Green diesel may refer to:

- Biodiesel, fuel made from vegetable oils
- Hydrotreated vegetable oil, hydrogenated alkane renewable diesel
- Marked motor oil, diesel containing green fuel dye for taxation

== See also ==
- Biomass to liquid, synthesis of fuel from biomass
- Vegetable oil refining (disambiguation)
