= Turnaround (refining) =

Scheduled downtime of an industrial plant

A turnaround (TAR) is a scheduled event wherein an entire process unit of an industrial plant, such as a refinery, petrochemical plant, power plant, or paper mill, is taken offstream for an extended period for work to be carried out. Turnaround is a blanket term that encompasses more specific terms such as I&Ts (inspection and testing), and maintenance. Turnaround can also be used as a synonym of downtime.

Related terms are shutdowns, and outages sometimes written as Turnarounds, Shutdowns, and Outages (TSO).

== Maintenance budget ==
Turnarounds are expensive, both in terms of lost production while the process unit is offline and in terms of direct costs for the labour, tools, heavy equipment and materials used to execute the project. They are the most significant portion of an industrial plant's yearly maintenance budget and can affect the company's bottom line if mismanaged. Turnarounds have unique project management characteristics.

== See also ==
- Shutdown (nuclear reactor)
- Testing, inspection and certification
- Unit testing
