= Blowdown stack =

Safety design feature for industrial plant buildings

A blowdown stack is an elevated vent or vertical stack that is used to vent the pressure of components of a chemical, refinery or other plant if there is a process problem or emergency. A blowdown stack can be used to complement a flare stack or as an alternative. The purpose is to prevent 'loss of containment' of volatile liquids and gases. Blowdown from several systems may be combined in a blowdown header prior to the stack. A knock-out pot may be provided at the base of the stack to remove any liquids. Blowdown stacks may either be ignited (like a flare) or un-ignited (a ‘cold’ vent). The height of the blowdown stack must be tall enough to ensure the safe dispersal of vapour.

== Blowdown ==
Blowdown is the controlled removal, safe flow and disposal of vapour from a pressure vessel. Blowdown, or depressurisation, removes hazardous inventory from a vessel, reduces the pressure in the vessel and thereby reduces the stresses in the vessel walls. Blowdown is used prior to draining of a vessel for maintenance. It is also undertaken in a plant emergency situation to remove and dispose of hazardous material to mitigate the possibility of incident escalation. When pressure vessels are exposed to a fire, the stresses in the vessel walls are increased, potentially leading to rupture; blowdown reduces the stress levels.

Blowdown is through a pipe connected to the vapour space of the vessel. A normally closed actuated blowdown valve (BDV) opens and allows vapour to pass from the vessel to relief system or blowdown stack. BDVs are configured to open in the event of a failure of the control or actuation system. A restriction orifice plate downstream of the BDV ensures the vessel is blowndown in an appropriate time period. For refinery and associated oil and gas systems the requirement is to reduce the pressure to 100 psig (6.9 barg) in 15 minutes. These restrictions ensure that flowrates do not exceed the capacity of the blowdown system and that Joule-Thomson cooling does not increase the stresses in the vessel or blowdown system, potentially leading to brittle fracture.

== Incidents ==
The failure of the blowdown stack to contain hydrocarbons vented from a raffinate splitter led to the catastrophic Texas City refinery explosion in 2005.

== See also ==
- Gas flare
- Shutdown valve
- Piping
- Oil production plant
- Oil refinery
