= Selective leaching =

Form of corrosion where components of an alloy are preferentially leached

In metallurgy, selective leaching, also called dealloying, demetalification, parting and selective corrosion, is a type of corrosion affecting some solid solution alloys, when in suitable conditions a component of the alloys is preferentially leached from the initially homogenous material. The less-noble metal is removed from the alloy by a microscopic-scale galvanic corrosion mechanism. The most susceptible alloys are the ones containing metals with high distance between each other in the galvanic series, e.g. the copper and zinc in brass. The elements most typically undergoing selective removal are zinc, aluminium, iron, cobalt, chromium, and others.

== Leaching of zinc ==
The most common example is selective leaching of zinc (dezincification) from brass alloys containing more than 15% zinc in the presence of oxygen and moisture, e.g. from brass taps in chlorine-containing water. Dezincification has been studied since the 1860s, and the mechanism by which it occurs was under extensive examination by the 1960s. It is believed that both copper and zinc gradually dissolve out simultaneously, and copper precipitates back from the solution. The material remaining is a copper-rich sponge with poor mechanical properties, and a color changed from yellow to red. Dezincification can be caused by water containing sulfur, carbon dioxide, and oxygen. Stagnant or low velocity waters tend to promote dezincification.

To combat this, arsenic or tin can be added to brass, or gunmetal can be used instead. Dezincification resistant brass (DZR), also known as Brass C352, is an alloy used to make pipe fittings for use with drinking water. Plumbing fittings that are resistant to dezincification are appropriately marked, with the letters "CR" (Corrosion Resistant) or DZR (dezincification resistant) in the UK, and the letters "DR" (dezincification resistant) in Australia.

== Graphitic corrosion ==
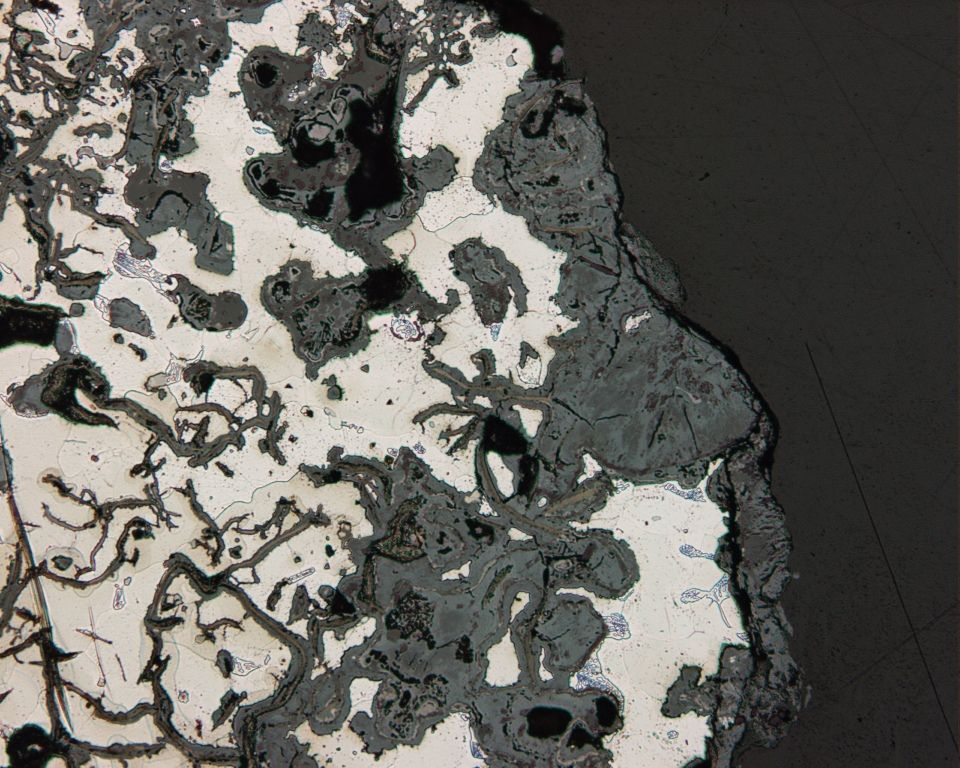
Selective corrosion on cast iron. Magnification 100x

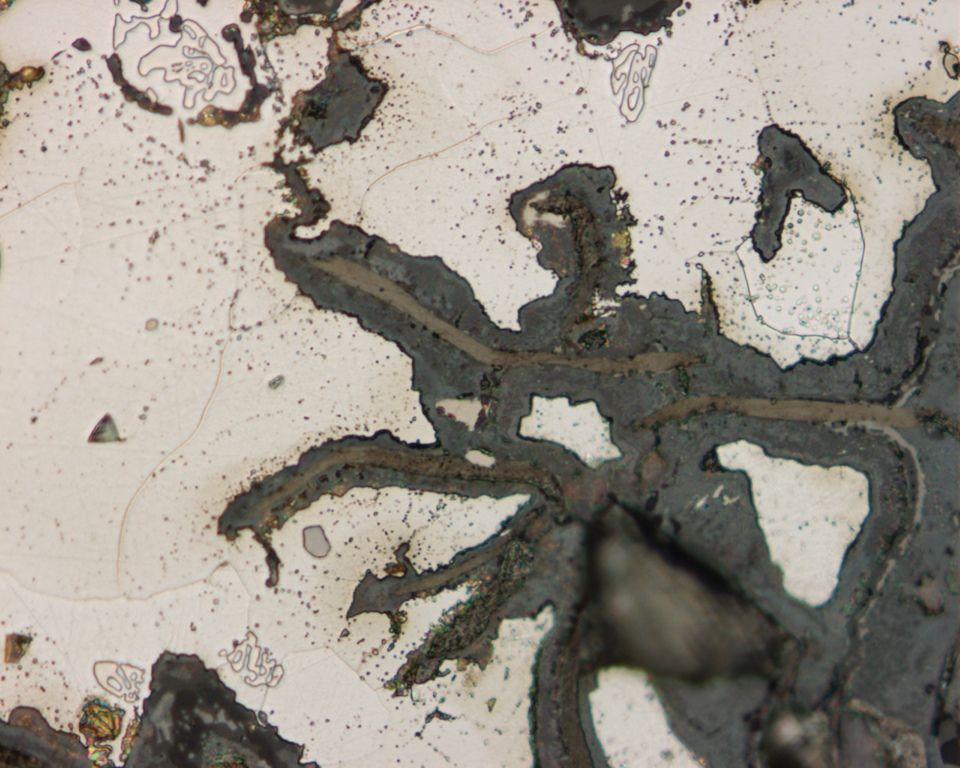
Selective corrosion on cast iron. Magnification 500x

Graphitic corrosion (also known graphitization and spongiosis) is selective leaching of iron from grey cast iron, where iron is removed (or converted to oxides such as FeO(OH)) and graphite grains remain intact, retaining shape but losing most strength. Affected surfaces develop a layer of graphite, rust, and metallurgical impurities that may inhibit further leaching. The effect can be substantially reduced by alloying the cast iron with nickel.

== Leaching of other elements ==
Dealuminification is a corresponding process for aluminum alloys. Similar effects for other metals are decobaltification, denickelification, etc.

Decarburization intentionally removes carbon from the surface of alloy. High-temperature hydrogen attack detrimentally converts carbon into methane.

== Mechanisms ==
=== Liquid metal dealloying ===
When an initially homogeneous alloy is placed in an acid that can preferentially dissolve one or more components out of the alloy, the remaining component will diffuse and organize into a unique, nano-porous microstructure. The resulting material will have ligaments, formed by the remaining material, surrounded by pores, empty space from which atoms were leached or diffused away.

==== Porosity development ====
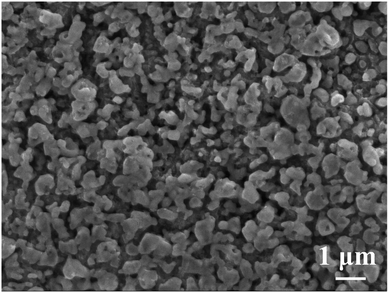
A typical nanoporous microstructure after dealloying (of an AgAl alloy)

The prototypical system for dealloying to create nano-porous metals is the np-Au system, which is created by selectively leaching Ag out of an Au-Ag homogenous alloy.

The way that porosity develops during the dealloying process has been studied computationally to understand the diffusional pathways on an atomistic level. Firstly, the less-noble atoms must be dissolved away from the surface of the alloy. This process is easiest for the lower coordinated atoms, i.e., those bonded to fewer other atoms, usually found as single atoms sitting on the surface ("adatoms"), but it is more difficult for higher coordinated atoms, i.e., those sitting at "steps" or in the bulk of the material. Thus, the slowest step, and that which is most important for determining rate of porosity evolution is the dissolution of these higher coordinated less-noble atoms. Just as the less-noble metal is less stable as an adatom on the surface, so is an atom of the more-noble metal. Therefore, as dissolution proceeds, any more-noble atoms will move to more stable positions, like steps, where its coordination is higher. This diffusion process is similar to spinodal decomposition. Eventually, clusters of more-noble atoms form this way, and surrounding less-noble atoms dissolve away, leaving behind a "bicontinuous structure" and providing a pathway for dissolution to continue deeper into the metal.

== Effects on mechanical properties ==
=== Testing methods ===
Due to the relatively small sample size achievable with dealloying, the mechanical properties of these materials are often probed using the following techniques:

- Nanoindentation
- Micropillar compression
- Deflection testing of bridges
- Thin-film wrinkling

=== Strength and stiffness of nanoporous materials ===
A common concept in materials science is that, at ambient conditions, smaller features (like grain size or absolute size) generally lead to stronger materials (see Hall–Petch strengthening, Weibull statistics). However, due to the high-level of porosity in the dealloyed materials, their strengths and stiffnesses are relatively low compared to the bulk counterparts. The decrease in strength due to porosity can be described with the Gibson-Ashby (GA) relations, which give the yield strength and Young's modulus of a foam according to the following equations:

$$\sigma_y^{foam} = C_{\sigma}\sigma_y^{bulk}(\rho^*)^{n_{\sigma}}$$

$$E^{foam} = C_{E}E^{bulk}(\rho^*)^{n_{E}}$$

where $C_\sigma$ and $C_E$ are geometric constants, $n_\sigma$ and $n_E$ are microstructure dependent exponents, and $\rho^* = \rho^{foam} / \rho^{bulk}$ is the relative density of the foam.

The GA relations can be used to estimate the strength and stiffness of a given dealloyed, porous material, but more extensive study has revealed an additional factor: ligament size. When the ligament diameter is greater than 100 nm, increasing ligament size leads to greater agreement between GA predictions and experimental measurements of yield stress and Young's modulus. However, when the ligament size is under 100 nm, which is very common in many dealloying processes, there is an addition to the GA strength that looks similar to Hall–Petch strengthening of bulk polycrystalline metals (i.e., the yield stress increases with the inverse square root of grain size). Combining this relationship with the GA relation from before, an expression for the yield stress of dealloyed materials with ligaments smaller than 100 nm can be determined:

$$\sigma_y^{foam} = C_{\sigma}A\lambda^{-m}(\rho^*)^{n_{\sigma}}$$

where A and m are empirically determined constants, and $\lambda$ is the ligament size. The $\lambda^{-m}$ represents the Hall-Petch-like contribution.

There are two theories for why this increase in strength occurs: 1) dislocations are less common in smaller sample volumes, so deformation requires activation of sources (which is a more difficult process), or 2) dislocations pile-up, which strengthens the material. Either way, there would be significant surface and small volume effects in the ligaments <100 nm, which lead to this increase in yield stress. A relationship between ligament size and Young's modulus has not been studied past the GA relation.

Occasionally, the metastable nature of these materials means that ligaments in the structure may "pinch off" due to surface diffusion, which decreases the connectivity of the structure, and reduces the strength of the dealloyed material past what would be expected from simply porosity (as predicted by the Gibson-Ashby relations).

==== Dislocation motion in nano-porous materials ====
Because the ligaments of these materials are essentially small metallic samples, they are themselves expected to be quite ductile, although the entire nano-porous material is often observed to be brittle in tension. Dislocation behavior is extensive within the ligaments (just as would be expected in a metal): a high density of partial dislocations, stacking faults and twins has been observed both in simulation and in TEM. However, the morphology of the ligaments makes bulk dislocation motion very difficult; the limited size of each ligament and complex connectivity within the nano-porous structure means that a dislocation cannot freely travel long distances and thus induce large-scale plasticity.

== Countermeasures ==
Countermeasures involve using alloys not susceptible to grain boundary depletion, using a suitable heat treatment, altering the environment (e.g. lowering oxygen content), and/or using cathodic protection.

== Uses ==
Selective leaching can be used to produce powdered materials with extremely high surface area, such as Raney nickel and other heterogeneous catalysts. Selective leaching can be the pre-final stage of depletion gilding.

== See also ==
- Corrosion engineering
