= Pre-start-up audit =

Part of the planning process for projects

The Pre-Start-Up Audit (PSUA) or Pre-startup review is a part of the planning process for projects during which the safety and functionality of the process itself is checked to ensure that all systems should function as intended and potential hazards can be dealt with. This process is commonly used in projects related to construction, reconditioning or repair of equipment and facilities designed to process hazardous substances.

== Overview ==
The PSUA process is commonly found in nuclear, oil, gas, pharmaceutical and petrochemical projects and comprises a combined safety and operability audit to ensure that hydrocarbons or other hazardous materials can be safely introduced into a newly constructed (or reconstructed) plant, asset or facility for the first time.

Furthermore, it is used to assure the owner or operator of that plant, asset or facility that it is capable of starting, controlling and stopping it safely, efficiently and without harm to people, the plant itself or to the environment.

A PSUA is often preceded by a Pre-Start-Up Review (PSUR), some months prior to the scheduled PSUA, in order to evaluate the magnitude of the outstanding work that will need to be completed prior to start-up. This will also provide feedback to the project team of any items that have been overlooked or may seem to be behind schedule.

The PSUA process is often carried out as a part of the operations readiness and assurance (OR&A) process.
