= High-temperature hydrogen attack =

Steel-related engineering problem

High temperature hydrogen attack (HTHA), also called hot hydrogen attack or methane reaction, is a problem which concerns steels operating at elevated temperatures (typically above 400 °F (204 °C)) in hydrogen-rich atmospheres, such as refineries, petrochemical and other chemical facilities and, possibly, high pressure steam boilers. It is not to be confused with hydrogen embrittlement.

If a steel is exposed to very hot hydrogen, the high temperature enables the hydrogen molecules to dissociate and to diffuse into the alloy as individual diffusible atoms. There are two stages to the damage:

1. First, dissolved carbon in the steel reacts with the surface hydrogen and escapes into the gas as methane. This leads to superficial decarburization and a loss of strength in the surface. Initially, the damage is not visible.
2. Second, the reduction in the concentration of dissolved carbon creates a driving force which dissolves the carbides in the steel. This leads to a loss of strength deeper in the steel and is more serious. At the same time, some hydrogen atoms diffuse into the steel and combine with carbon to form tiny pockets of methane at internal surfaces, such as grain boundaries and defects. This methane gas cannot diffuse out of the metal, and collects in the voids at high pressure and initiates cracks in the steel. This selective leaching of carbon is a more serious loss of strength and ductility.

HTHA can be managed by using a different steel alloy, one where the carbides with other alloying elements, such as chromium and molybdenum, are more stable than iron carbides. Surface oxide layers are ineffective as a protection as they are immediately reduced by the hydrogen, forming water vapour.

Later-stage damage in the steel component can be seen using ultrasonic examination, which detects the large defects created by methane pressure. These large defects in a stressed component are usually the cause of failure in service: which is usually catastrophic as hot flammable hydrogen gas escapes rapidly.

== See also ==
- 2010 Tesoro Anacortes Refinery disaster
- Corrosion engineering
- Hydrogen safety
