= Refining =

Process of purification

Refining is the process of purification of a (1) substance or a (2) form. The term is usually used of a natural resource that is almost in a usable form, but which is more useful in its pure form. For instance, most types of natural petroleum will burn straight from the ground, but it will burn poorly and quickly clog an engine with residues and by-products. The term is broad, and may include more drastic transformations, such as the reduction of ore to metal (for which see Refining (metallurgy)).

The refining of liquids is often accomplished by distillation or fractionation; this process is useful, for example, for isolating different fractions of petroleum. Gases can be refined in this way as well, by being cooled and/or compressed until they liquefy. Gases and liquids can also be refined by extraction with a selective solvent that dissolves away either the substance of interest, or the unwanted impurities.

Many solids can be refined by growing crystals in a solution of the impure material; the regular structure of the crystal tends to favor the desired material and exclude other kinds of particles.

Chemical reactions are often used to remove impurities of particular types.

The use of silicon and other semiconductors in electronics depends on precise control of impurities. The zone melting process developed by William Gardner Pfann was used to produce pure germanium, and subsequently float-zone silicon became available when Henry Theuerer of Bell Labs adapted Pfann's method to silicon.

Types of materials that are usually refined:

- metals (see Refining (metallurgy)
- petroleum (see Oil refinery)
- silicon
- sugar (see Sugar refinery)
- flour (see Gristmill)
- table salt
- vegetable oil (see Food oil refinement for food use and Vegetable oil refining for biofuel use)
- air
- glass

== See also ==
- Continuous distillation
- Natural gas processing
- Refinery
- Wafer (electronics)
- Air separation
