= Vegetable oil refining =

Vegetable oil refining may refer to:

- Fat hydrogenation, combining vegetable oil with hydrogen to make it more saturated
- Edible oil refining, process to refin a raw oil to produce an edible oil, which differ from Olive oil production.
- Biodiesel production by transesterification
- Production of hydrotreated vegetable oil, a biofuel
