= Corrosion under insulation =

Corrosion under insulation (CUI) is a severe form of localized external corrosion that occurs in carbon and low alloy steel equipment that has been insulated. This form of corrosion occurs when water is absorbed by or collected in the insulation. The equipment begins to corrode as it is exposed to water and oxygen. CUI is common in refineries and process plants that typically operate equipment at high temperatures. Corrosion occurs where there is thermal cycling. In this instance the moisture condenses back on to the core material until it is flashed off when the plant is brought back into operation. It also occurs in carbon and low alloy steels at temperatures between 10 and 350 °F (−12 and 177 °C), and in austenitic stainless steels and duplex stainless steels at temperatures between 140 and 400 °F (60 and 204 °C)
