= Marvin Mangus =

American geologist and painter

Marvin Dale Mangus (1924–2009) was an American geologist and landscape painter. He was giving the honor of driving a purely symbolic wood stake prior to start of drilling the actual oil well by the Atlantic Richfield Corporation, his employer. The focus of his later art career was glorified role of geologist and other exploration of Alaska. He painted animals and birds and was recognized with awards from The National Park Service

== Early life ==
Marvin Mangus was born in Altoona, Pennsylvania. His grandfather Cyrus and his two grand-uncles were all civil war veterans and lived into their 80s [6, 7 ]. His father, Alfred Ross Mangus (1889–1974), initially worked for the Pennsylvania Railroad in Altoona, but later started Mangus Express Company, a small trucking company based in Altoona. Marvin Mangus was the youngest of three siblings. His brother Alfred was hit by a car and killed [1920-1933]. His sister Izora lived from [1916-2003]

At Altoona Area High School, Mangus was interested at pursuing an art career, but as the Depression lingered on, he studied ceramic science in the Mineral Science Department at Pennsylvania State University. After the US military decided that there it had a shortage of geologists Mangus was asked by the Dean to switch his major to geology. He later completed his Masters of Science in geology in 1946 (19). Mangus saw a slide show presentation by the Alaska Branch of United States Geological Survey, which was based in Washington D.C.. At this time the Alaska Branch of USGS employees resided in Washington D. C., about 180 miles away from Altoona. Mangus stop his work on his PHd. in Geology and started his employment. He met his wife Jane at a Penn State Georgetown Basketball game played in Washington D.C. via mutual Pennsylvania State UniversityAlumni friends. Jane and Marvin married in 1950 at a United Methodist Church in Washington D.C.

At Penn State, he was also a member of the men's gymnastics team, medaling in the 1945 Amateur Athletic Union (AAU)Gymnastics Championship in rope climbing.

== Career ==
Mangus was hired by the USGS Alaska Branch based in Washington DC in 1946. His typical work year consisted of field geology in the Brooks Range from after Memorial Day to before Labor Day, because collection of rock samples was best accomplished when the ground was free of snow. Mangus co-authored several USGS Publications detailing the team's findings in Alaska.

Starting in 1958, Mangus worked with the Atlantic Refining Company. His wife Jane, and sons Alfred and Donald, resided in Guatemala City in 1958–59, and moved to Calgary in 1960–61. In summer 1962 the family moved again, this time to Anchorage, Alaska, where Mangus and three other employees served as the Alaskan staff of Atlantic.

As a field geologist, he traveled to Guatemala, Bolivia, Yukon, and the Northwest Territories of Canada, before finally settling in Anchorage, Alaska in 1962. Mangus mapped the entire Arctic North Slope from the Brooks Range, starting at Cape Lisburne, over to the 141st meridian.

The Richfield Oil Corporation of California also owned the right to drill on "oil leases" for Prudhoe Bay Oil Field Discovery Well. After a merger of Atlantic with Richfield, and the creation of ARCO, Mangus and his colleagues were able to convince the company leadership in Dallas, including CEO Robert Orville Anderson, to drill an exploratory well at Prudhoe Bay. Mangus, as an ARCO geologist, was given the honor of driving a wood stake for the landmark drilling sites for the discovery and confirmation wells of the Prudhoe Bay Oil Field. This wood stake was just a symbolic honor. John M. Sweet was Mangus' supervisor in Canada and Alaska. Sweets' book summarizes history of geologic exploration in Alaska and the details leading to The Discovery of Oil at Prudhoe Bay. and compares the vast size of the Prudhoe Bay Oilfield to others in North America. Robert O. Anderson announced Sag River confirmation well or proof that Prudhoe Bay had oil in July 1968. Currently ARCO is a subsidiary of BP who is majority owner of Prudhoe Bay Oil Field and Alyeska Pipeline Service Company.In 1969, Mangus was with a twelve-man ARCO team that discovered the giant Kavik natural gas field. Only oil is pumped via the pipeline out of Prudhoe Bay and shipped via oil tankers to west coast ports in the USA. Federal law prohibits Alaskan Oil from being sold or bartered to other countries. Almost fifty years later, no natural gas from the North Slope is currently being used by consumers. South Central Alaska which includes Anchorage, Kenai, Palmer, and Wasilla uses natural gas from the Cook Inlet Natural Gas Field owned and operated by ConocoPillips. Some professionals estimate that 25% of known or projected natural gas reserves reside in the North Slope. The adjacent Kuparuk Oil Field is the second largest oil field in North American ( Wikipedia).

Leaving ARCO in 1969, after largest oil find in North America, a.k.a. Prudhoe Bay, Mangus co-founded a private consultanting firm, Fackler, Calderwood, and Mangus (later Calderwood and Mangus, after Fackler took a state of Alaska Geology position). Fackler retired as a State of Alaska employee. Mangus did not anticipate that it would be almost ten years later before T.A.P.S. Trans Alaskan Oil Pipeline would become operational. After the death of his partner, Keith Calderwood, Mangus continued his consulting work solo. Keith died of cancer in his mid 50s. Calderwood had served as President of the Petroleum Club of Anchorage, and Mangus maintained his professional affiliations until his own death. Mangus announced to the media in around 1989 at age 65, that his focus would be painting rather than geology. However he maintained his Alaskan geology license and professional connections. His 50-year pin for AAPG membership was received at his home only a few days after his death.

== Painting ==
In the late 1940s to 1958 Mangus began his art career with still life and landscape painting in Washington D.C., as a member of the Washington Landscape Club, later renamed the Washington Society of Landscape Painters, Inc. He quickly improved his impressionistic painting techniques thanks to lessons and workshops from artists Eliot O'Hara, Roger Ritasse, and William F. Walter. Landscape painting combined his passionate interests in art, geology, history, and his love of the out-of-doors.

Mangus was a Plein Air painter, and whenever possible, he carried his painting supplies into the field to record what he saw and experienced. Mangus completed paintings of most places that he lived or visited, and worked in the media of oils, cassein, acrylics, and watercolor. Although he is best known for his Alaskan images, he often painted scenes from many other locales, including the East Coast/Pennsylvania, Guatemala, Alberta areas where he lived or visited such as Hawaii. He also painted scenes recording the contributions by previous generations of Alaskan geologists. He sometimes gave painting demonstrations to Anchorage school children.

Mangus' artwork has been exhibited in numerous venues, including the Corcoran Gallery of Washington D.C., the Smithsonian Museum Area Show, the Arts Club of Washington, the Baltimore Watercolor Society, All-Alaska Juried shows, and the Centennial Traveling Art Exhibition. As of 2016, thirteen of his paintings are part of the permanent collection of the Municipality of Anchorage, tracked and stored by the Anchorage Fine Arts Museum. The Rasmuson Foundation, The Pennsylvania State University each owns at least one Mangus' painting.

== Prints ==
Since he was not an enthusiast of photo-offset prints, only three were issued during his lifetime. "Breakup, Matanuska Valley, Alaska," was made as a fund raiser for The United Methodist Church, and features a lake with ice melting in the spring. The second, titled "Point Lay, Alaska^{P8}", was made for PBS Anchorage, Alaska Channel 6 as a fund raiser, and depicts a salmon-drying rack. The third was a print of the USS Nimitz aircraft carrier sailing into Cook Inlet, Alaska, created in the mid-nineties to commemorate a special 4 July weekend shore leave. These prints were given away to US Navy crew members and Anchorage VFW Post friends.

== Field geology details ==
Mangus was part of the USGS team of geologists working in partnership with the US Navy to explore and determine what oil resources existed inside and near Navy Petroleum Reserve Number 4. This project started in 1944 and ended in 1953. Several teams of USGS geologist were sent out to different areas to create an organized search of rock outcrops and map the entire area. Mangus started as a team member and later was promoted to one of the team leaders. The US Navy supplied the equipment thus, After World War Two, surplus amphibious M29 Weasel, collapsible boats, bush planes, and C-Rations were used by Mangus and his USGS colleagues, Robert "Bob" L. Detterman, William P. Brosge, Bill Patton, Tom Dutro and others. Mangus liked to perform the cache operations with bush pilot "Sig" Sigurd Wien of Wien Air Alaska.They became lifelong friends because “Sig” Wien flew with Mangus as the only other person on the plane. Bush plane flying was dangerous but Sig Wien was one of the best and well known expert pilot. Later Wien became the CEO of Wien Air Alaska. Mangus was a client via the Federal Government 1946 to 1957 and later in 1962 to 1969 with ARCO.

Some trips were planned in advance so as to use a river flowing downstream for transportation, and then the collapsible boats would be dropped by bush plane. Mangus would push out 55-gallon drums from inside the bush plane. Each drum had been filled with C-Rations and resealed to protect their food contents from marauding bears. The field geologists did not carry radio equipment, so they were isolated for several months without contact with others. There was normally no bush plane contact to deliver either supplies or mail. No commercial radio stations nor devices to play music. So normally quiet Tim was either reading or conversations with team members. Thus lifelong friendships occurred from the USGS explorations from 1946 to 1957.

The geologists lived in white canvas tents and would often go three months in the remote wilderness without a shower or radio. They would climb to a site, select rock samples, and carry them back to their boats or amphibious M29 Weasel. Records were kept on where samples were taken for the official USGS reports, and the samples were then shipped back to Washington D.C.

Mangus joined Atlantic Refining Company of Philadelphia in 1958. His family of four lived in Guatemala City for about two years from summer of 1958 to summer of 1961. Transfers occurred during the summers as not to interrupt school for his two sons. One field season was in Guatemala and the Yukatan Peninsula of Mexico. The next year was field geology in Bolivia and Peru.

Atlantic Refining Company relocated the Mangus family to Calgary Alberta Canada in June 1960. Mangus performed field geology in Northwest Territories adjacent to the Alaska border to research the possibility of oil and gas on the east side of the border with Alaska. His supervisor in Calgary was John Sweet, who was born in Pennsylvania and their birthdays were about a week apart.

In 1961, Mangus was in a helicopter that hit a tree in remote Canada, and fell about 40 to 50 feet. The occupants hiked for three days to the nearest native settlement. As a result of the crash, he had back surgery in Canada and the long-term effects of a fused spine bothered him for the remainder of his life.

Mangus was transferred to Anchorage Alaska in June 1962 with his wife and two sons. John Sweet and his wife and his five children were transferred at the same time. John Sweet was his supervisor and there were only two employees with Atlantic Refining Companyin Alaska. More details of their relationship is described in John Sweet's book. Mangus continued to lead field geologic parties for search for oil throughout Alaska. He estimated about seven years of living in tents or remote sites. This occurred over a 28-year period.

== Awards ==
- 1993 GEOSC from The College of Earth And Mineral Sciences of The Pennsylvania State University Alumni Award
- Arts in the Parks "Top 100" 1989 and 1996 for a painting entitled “Yukon Quest” United States Park Service.
