= John Deuss =

Dutch businessman (born 1942)

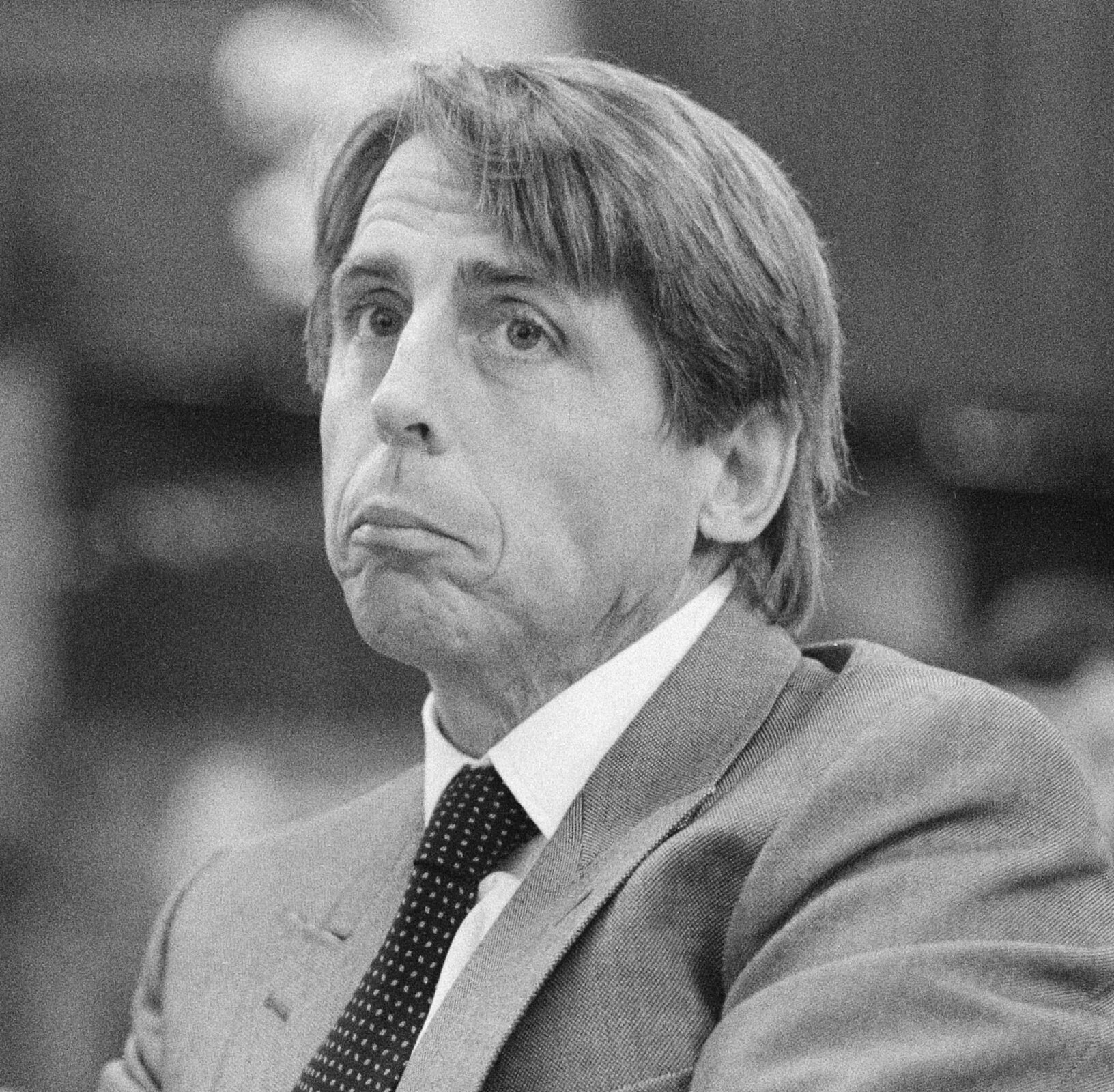
- Deuss at the 1989 Rotterdam Oil Symposium
- Born: Johannes Christiaan Martinus Augustinus Maria Deuss; 28 August 1942 (age 84); Nijmegen, Netherlands
- Occupations: founder and former CEO of JOC Oil, Transworld Oil, First Curacao International Bank, former CEO and chairman of Bermuda Commercial Bank, co-founder of Chief Executive (magazine)

Johannes Christiaan Martinus Augustinus Maria "John" Deuss (born 28 August 1942) is a Dutch businessman who started a variety of businesses, most notably an oil trading company that he attempted to build into an integrated oil company by diversifying into oil exploration, oil refining and operating a large chain of gas stations.

He founded JOC Oil, later rebranded as Transworld Oil, founded and wholly owned First Curacao International Bank, was the chairman, CEO and owner of 47% of Bermuda Commercial Bank. In 1985 he bought 576 service stations in Pennsylvania and New York plus a refinery in Pennsylvania for $420 million from ARCO. He rebranded the stations to their former name Atlantic. Deuss later sold the stations plus refinery, pipelines and terminals in 1988 to Sunoco for $513 million.

He has been involved in a number of public controversies including accusations of selling oil to the apartheid regime of South Africa and owning a bank which permitted carousel fraud.

== Early life ==
Johannes Christiaan Martinus Augustinus Maria Deuss, known as John Deuss, was born in Nijmegen in the Netherlands in 1942.

His father was a manager at General Motors in Amsterdam. He has one younger sister Martina "Tineke" Deuss.

Deuss finished eight grades of school after which he started his career. He owned a Citroen dealership around his early twenties and later started importing Hino trucks and cars from Japan. In partnership with Hino he attempted to establish an assembly plant for Hino trucks in the Netherlands, but the venture failed after Hino was acquired by Toyota. Deuss was forced to declare bankruptcy.

== Career ==
At the age of 25, soon after his bankruptcy in the automotive industry, Deuss became a commodity trader, entering the oil market with his company JOC Oil. Of his first ever deal he said: I had diesel from Agip from Italy brought to Rotterdam with a small storage on a tanker. Everything starts simple. If you have success, it grows. You have one transaction. Then you do a second one.

He signed a contract in 1976 with the USSR's national oil company Soujuznefteexport to export crude over a number of years. The deal broke down in controversial circumstances after Deuss sold 39 consignments but only paid for the first six. Years of litigation followed, with hearings in the Bermuda Supreme Court, the Bermuda Court of Appeal and the Judicial Committee of the Privy Council.

Deuss moved to Bermuda and in 1973 set up the First Curaçao International Bank (FCIB) in the Antilles. JOC Oil was located in Bermuda for tax reasons and made deals globally in places such as Cuba, Denmark, Ghana, Indonesia, Iran, Iraq, Malta, Mexico, Taiwan and Zaire. Deuss employed former CIA agent Theodore Shackley as a risk analyst.

Since JOC Oil was embroiled in legal difficulties, Deuss created a new company, Transworld Oil. In 1984, The Observer revealed that Deuss had broken the United Nations sanctions imposed on trade with apartheid South Africa. He was shipping Soviet and Iranian oil to South Africa using stealth and deception until in 1987 Transworld announced it had stopped supplying the apartheid regime. A castle he owned in the Netherlands, in the village of Berg en Dal, was firebombed in protest by a group called Pyromaniacs against Apartheid. Researcher Steve LeVine later estimated that Deuss had made between $280 million and $500 million from these deliveries. The Shipping Research Bureau tracked the shipments at the time and after South African archives were declassified, the statistics showed that Deuss and Transworld Oil had supplied over half of South Africa's oil in 1982.

Carousel fraud explained

In early 1988, Deuss attempted to corner the global oil market. Having conferred with Mana Al Otaiba, Minister of Petroleum and Mineral Resources of the United Arab Emirates, and gained an assurance that the Organization of the Petroleum Exporting Countries (OPEC) would reduce production, Deuss bought up almost all crude shipments from the Brent oilfield for $425 million. He expected oil prices to rise since he controlled the available supply, but Shell and Exxon had secretly teamed up to organise extra shipments; Shell trader Peter Ward said "Deuss is a buccaneer [...] Let's teach him a lesson". When Shell leaked their plan to the media, Deuss realised he had been outmanouevred and was forced to sell the shipments at a loss of $600 million.

After the dissolution of the Soviet Union in the early 1990s, Deuss saw an opportunity for profit in Kazakhstan. He proposed selling oil from the Tengiz Field to Chevron Corporation, via the Caspian Pipeline Consortium. As president of the Oman Oil Company, Deuss negotiated with the Kazakh and Russian governments to set up the consortium, but Chevron refused to negotiate with him and was backed by the US government. Eventually, Russia dropped its support for Deuss and he stepped away so that the project could continue.

In 2006, his Dutch castle was raided and he was arrested then extradited from Bermuda to the Netherlands to face charges of receiving stolen goods, running a criminal organization and money laundering. In a co-investigation, Dutch prosecutors had requested an international arrest warrant after British police had observed that everyone arrested in the previous two years for carousel fraud had been a customer of the FCIB. The fraud was estimated to cost around £30 billion across Europe every year. The bank was raided in Willemstad and had its assets frozen, whilst people (including Deuss' sister Tineke) were arrested in England, the Netherlands and Wales. Deuss was convicted of banking without a license and not reporting unusual transactions, which resulted in a six-month suspended sentence and a fine of 327,000 euros. In 2013, Deuss and his sister paid a settlement of 35 million euros to the Dutch authorities and in 2020, they paid an undisclosed amount to the Public Prosecution Service in Curaçao.

== Personal life ==
Deuss took an interest in show jumping, breeding horses in Bermuda and also Connecticut and Florida.

== See also ==
- Marc Rich
- Ian Taylor (British businessman)
