= Atlantic Petroleum =

American oil company

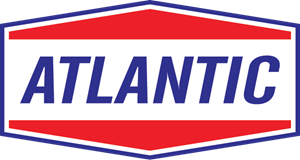
- Type: Private (1866–74, 1911–66); Subsidiary (1874–1911)
- Industry: Petroleum
- Founded: 1866 as the "Atlantic Petroleum Storage Company"
- Defunct: 1966; 60 years ago
- Fate: Acquired by Standard Oil in 1874; in 1966 merged with Richfield Oil Corporation to form ARCO
- Successor: ARCO (1966–1985)
- Headquarters: Philadelphia, Pennsylvania, U.S.
- Area served: United States
- Products: Gasoline
- Owner: Standard Oil (1874–1911)

Atlantic Petroleum was an oil company in the Eastern United States headquartered in Philadelphia, Pennsylvania, and a direct descendant of the Standard Oil Trust. It was also one of the companies that merged with Richfield Oil Corporation to form Atlantic Richfield Company later known as ARCO.

After an unsuccessful spinoff from ARCO, Atlantic was acquired by Sunoco in 1988. The remainder of ARCO was later acquired by BP, but BP later sold most of Arco's retail assets and brand name to Tesoro, later briefly renamed to Andeavor, and eventually acquired by Marathon Petroleum, which owns the ARCO brand to this day.

== History ==
=== Early years & Standard Oil ===
Atlantic was founded as the "Atlantic Petroleum Storage Company" in 1866, in the then-fledgling oil business. In 1874, the company, now known as "Atlantic Refining", was purchased by John D. Rockefeller and integrated as part of Standard Oil. The acquisition gave Rockefeller a major presence on the East Coast in his growing empire.

In 1886, after acquiring many other oil companies, the Standard Oil Trust organized territories for their companies. Atlantic's territory covered the entire state of Delaware, the southern half of New Jersey, and the southeasternmost corner of Pennsylvania, essentially giving Atlantic the entire Philadelphia area.

Due to antitrust issues that would eventually lead to the demise of the Trust in 1911, Atlantic absorbed fellow Standards Acme Oil of Pennsylvania and Pittsburgh-based Standard Oil (of Pennsylvania) in 1892.

=== Post-Standard years ===
As a result of the Sherman Antitrust Act, the Standard Oil Trust was broken up, and Atlantic was one of 11 companies to acquire rights to the Standard name. (In all, 35 companies were formed from the breakup, the most notable ones without rights to the Standard name being the Ohio Oil Company, which became Marathon and South Penn Oil Company, which though various mergers and acquisitions became Pennzoil.) Atlantic's rights were in the entire states of Pennsylvania and Delaware, as it had given up the southern half of New Jersey to Jersey Standard (later Exxon, now ExxonMobil).

However, like fellow baby Standard Conoco (now ConocoPhillips), Atlantic found more marketing power in its own name than the Standard name (a rarity at the time), and declined the option to use the name. The rights to the Standard name in Pennsylvania would be acquired by a newly formed Standard Oil of Pennsylvania, which would be acquired by Exxon in the late 1930s. ExxonMobil still owns the rights to the Standard name in Pennsylvania and Delaware.

Over the years, Atlantic would expand up across the East Coast of the U.S., mainly through acquisitions.

=== The ARCO years ===
Trying to establish a national presence, Atlantic merged with West Coast oil company Richfield Oil in 1966. The combined company became known as the Atlantic Richfield Company, eventually being better known by its acronym ARCO. Also beginning in 1966, chiefly in the Delaware River basin urban regions of southeastern Pennsylvania, New Jersey, and Delaware, ARCO sponsored a traffic-reporting service called "The ARCO Go Patrol," originally it was the "Atlantic Go Patrol".

While the merger with Richfield and eventual rebranding of the stations to ARCO was successful, it did essentially make the company a bi-coastal chain, having no presence from east of the Rocky Mountains to west of the Appalachian Mountains (save for Western Pennsylvania, since Atlantic was prominent in that state). This was remedied with the purchase of Sinclair Oil in 1969. To stay in compliance with antitrust laws, the Eastern assets of Sinclair as well as Atlantic's old assets in the Southeast were sold to BP. The remaining Sinclair service stations were rebranded as ARCO.

=== Revival and demise ===
The former Sinclair retail operations struggled, and ARCO abandoned its national ambitions, pulling out of a number of states beginning in the mid-1970s. Meanwhile, ARCO began to find success in Richfield's old West Coast territory as a low-cost gasoline provider. In the early 1980s, ARCO began blending methanol into its gasoline in the Northeast. Concerns over possible damage to automobile fuel systems limited consumer acceptance of the methanol blend and damaged the company's image. Management decided to concentrate on the West Coast market and ARCO sold off its Northeastern interests in 1985. Some were acquired by Shell, notably in New Jersey, but the larger portion went to a new company controlled by Dutch banker and oil trader John Deuss. The new company revived the Atlantic name, discontinued the use of methanol in its gasoline and launched its own convenience store brand, A-Plus.

While Atlantic was able to rebuild its station network during the short time it was owned by Deuss, Deuss's legal problems overseas involving carousel fraud, supplying apartheid South Africa with oil, and an unsuccessful attempt to corner the oil market by colluding with OPEC eventually led to Atlantic to struggle financially. In 1988, Deuss sold Atlantic to fellow Philadelphia oil company Sunoco.

For the next few years Atlantic was marketed separately from Sunoco as a lower-cost brand, and even introducing a new logo. However, in 1993, the decision was made to consolidate the two under one banner to reduce marketing costs, electing to use the more well-known Sunoco brand. In the mid-1990s, Atlantic stations began to be rebranded as Sunoco outlets. The last known Atlantic station, in Chambersburg, Pennsylvania, was rebranded as Sunoco in 1996.

Despite multiple oil companies operating multiple brands in the decades since (primarily due to mergers & acquisitions) such as ExxonMobil, Chevron Corporation, BP, Phillips 66, and current ARCO parent Marathon Petroleum, Sunoco has elected not to revive the Atlantic brand.

== Legacy ==
Many remnants of Atlantic still show with both Sunoco and ARCO (which is now owned by Marathon Petroleum and still uses the ARCO name except in Northern California, Oregon and Washington, where BP continues to operate ARCO stations). Besides the obvious reference with ARCO, Sunoco retained the A-Plus convenience store chain since Sunoco didn't have a chain of its own. Because of Sunoco's sponsorship as the "Official Fuel of NASCAR", A-Plus is currently "The Official Pit Stop of NASCAR". A-Plus has since been largely divested to 7-Eleven.

In addition, Sunoco still owned the former Atlantic Point Breeze refinery in Philadelphia, and had consolidated it with the former Gulf Oil Girard Point refinery (which Sunoco had acquired from Chevron) that was adjacent to the old Atlantic Point Breeze refinery. This Sunoco asset has since been reorganized as a separate company called Philadelphia Energy Solutions in which it holds a stake but is majority owned by Carlyle Group.

== See also ==
- Standard Oil
- ARCO
- Sunoco
- A-Plus
