= Phelps Anderson =

American politician and businessman

Member of the New Mexico House of Representatives from the 66th district
- In office January 15, 2019 – December 31, 2022
- Preceded by: Bob Wooley
- Succeeded by: Jimmy Mason
- In office January 1977 – 1980

Personal details
- Born: Roswell, New Mexico, U.S.
- Party: Independent (2021–present)
- Other political affiliations: Republican (before 2021)
- Relations: Robert O. Anderson (father)

Phelps Anderson is an American politician and businessman who served as a member of the New Mexico House of Representatives from the 66th district, which includes Roswell, New Mexico.

== Early life ==
Anderson was born and raised in Roswell, New Mexico, the son of oil magnate Robert Orville Anderson.

== Career ==
Prior to entering politics, Anderson worked as a businessman, managing his family's investment in oil and real estate. He was first elected to the New Mexico House of Representatives in 1976 and served until 1980. Anderson was an unsuccessful candidate for New Mexico's 2nd congressional district in 2002. He was elected to the New Mexico House of Representatives in 2018 and assumed office on January 15, 2019.

In 2021, Anderson left the Republican Party and registered as an independent.
