= B. R. Pettit =

American sculptor (1947–2006)

Billy Ray Pettit (1947–2006) was an American sculptor, best known for his bronze sculptures, which feature the rugged mountain men of the American West. His style was realistic, and much of his work portrayed aspects of pioneer life, the joys of the Rocky Mountain Rendezvous, and American Indian themes.

During his lifetime, Pettit created about seventeen bronze sculptures, with the most famous being "Old Bill" Williams. The eight-foot monument stands as a sentinel in the town of Williams, Arizona, the "gateway to the Grand Canyon." The statue has become an icon of historic Route 66. Pettit experienced fame when Senator Barry Goldwater unveiled the monument on April 26, 1980. The Bill Williams Mountain Men presented a 16-inch version of the sculpture to newly inaugurated President Ronald Reagan in January 1981, who kept it in the Oval Office.

== Early life and education ==
Pettit was the son of a building contractor, Ben Pettit, and his wife, who moved their family from Waldron, Arkansas to Williams, Arizona in 1953. As a boy living in the rugged mountains and pine forests of Williams, B.R. Pettit learned to love the lifestyle and history of mountain men.

He studied art in college at Northern Arizona University. He worked closely on sculpture with Dr. Winthrop Williams there as the university is known for its large bronze foundries for casting such work. Pettit taught art for a short time as he worked on his Master's Degree.

== "Ole Bill" Williams ==
Pettit completed an 8-foot sculpture of "Old Bill" Williams for his master's thesis; he donated his time and the materials were paid for by the city and local organizations, which had commissioned it for the Bill Williams Monument Park in Williams, Arizona. The monument was unveiled near Route 66 by US Senator Barry Goldwater in 1980, the first year of what is now the annual event of Rendezvous Days.

Pettit later said in a 1995 newspaper interview: "I'd always wanted to build a statue of William Sherley Williams, to help honor the famous trapper and mountain man who this city is named after." The sculptor continued using his detailed historical knowledge to create portraits of the mountain men's struggles and joys.

Altogether he made about 17 bronze sculptures, several of the mountain men.

In January 1981, the Bill Williams Mountain Men, dressed in full garb, carried a sixteen-inch, bronze version of Ole Bill Williams to Washington DC. The group presented the sculpture to the new president, Ronald Reagan at his inaugural celebrations. Pettit's piece was a favorite of President Reagan, as he displayed it prominently in the Oval Office during his terms. Afterward, he took the sculpture with him to California, where it was displayed in the Reagan living quarters. That bronze is now held in the collection of the Reagan Library.

Pettit died at age 59 in 2006 in Williams from Addison's disease.
