= Richfield Oil Corporation =

American petroleum company (1911–1966)

- Industry: Petroleum
- Founded: November 29, 1911
- Defunct: January 3, 1966
- Fate: Merged with Atlantic Petroleum
- Successor: Atlantic Richfield Company
- Headquarters: Richfield Tower, Los Angeles

Richfield Oil Corporation was an American petroleum company based in California from 1911 to 1966. In 1966, it merged with Atlantic Refining Company to form the Atlantic Richfield Company (later renamed ARCO).

== History ==
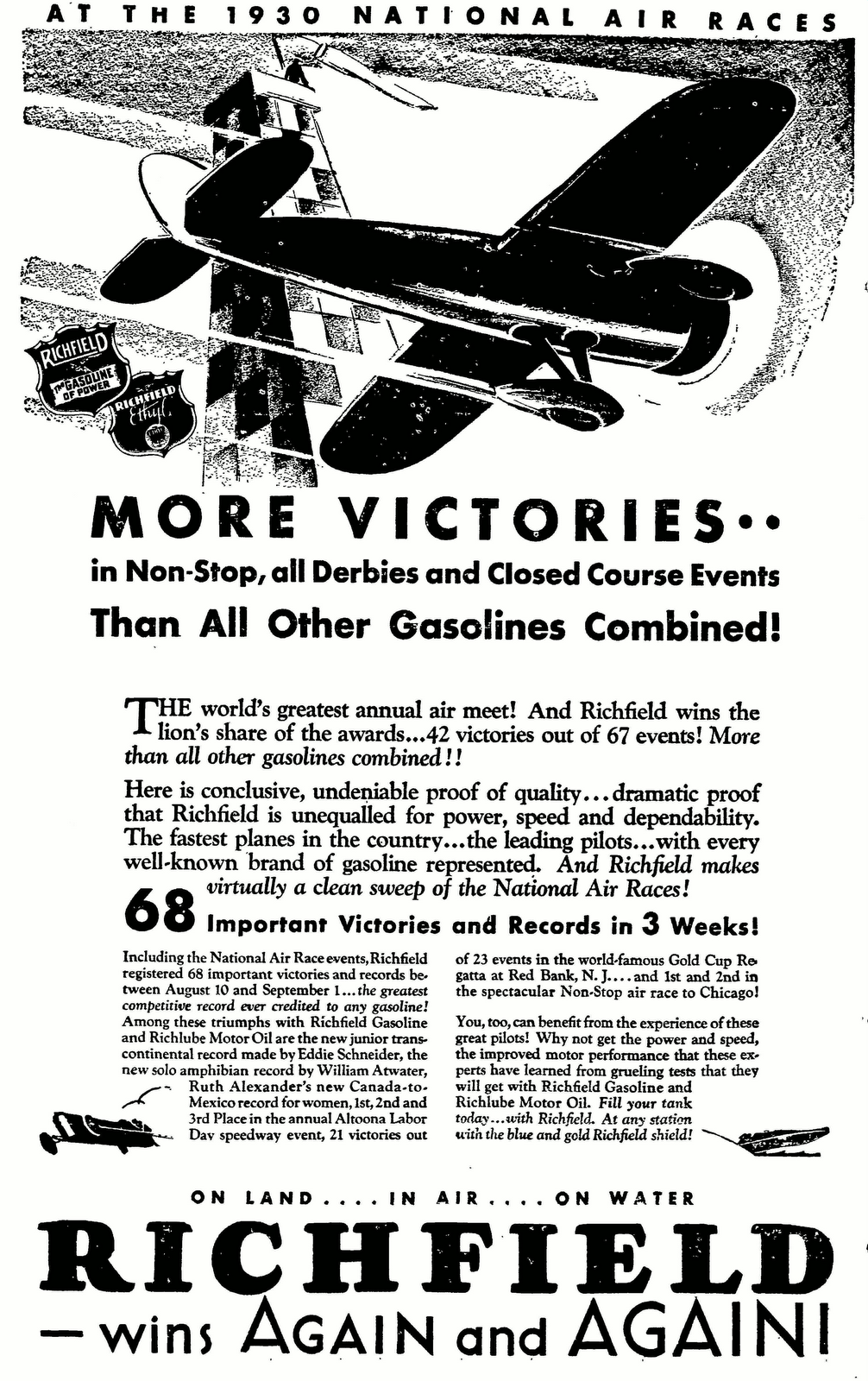
At The 1930 National Air Races. Oakland Tribune, September 9, 1930

The Richfield Oil Corporation was founded in 1911, and opened its first automotive service station in Los Angeles in 1917. Pacific Western Oil Corporation was successor to Petroleum Securities Co. and, when incorporated in 1928, continued Petroleum Securities Company's existing contract to supply crude oil to Richfield.

The 12-story black and gold Art Deco style Richfield Tower in Los Angeles, constructed in 1929, served as the corporate headquarters until its demolition in 1968.

After quick expansion, Richfield Oil Corp fell to the Great Depression and went into receivership in 1931. William C. McDuffie, recently elected president, who was also president of Pacific Western Oil, was appointed receiver on January 15, 1931 on complaint from Republic Supply Co. which owned $275,000 of the bonds.

Cities Service Company (now Citgo) offered one share of stock for every four of Richfield's and acquired a majority of the stock.

In 1932, Consolidated Oil Corporation (who was subsequently renamed Sinclair Oil Corporation), in 1932, offered to buy Richfield Oil. While this offer was not accepted, Harry Ford Sinclair, president of Consolidated Oil, continued to pursue Richfield Oil which prevented Standard Oil of California (Chevron) from taking over the company.

Consolidated Oil Corp, in 1935, bought Richfield's eastern United States operations. This maneuver removed Standard Oil of California's interest in Richfield Oil. The east coast gas stations would later be rebranded as Sinclair stations.

Richfield Oil Corp emerged from receivership in 1936 after Rio Grande, which was controlled jointly by Consolidated Oil Corp (Sinclair) and Cities Service Company (Citgo), agreed to merge with Richfield.

In 1938 Richfield opened the Carson Oil Refinery.

During World War II, on February 23, 1942, two Richfield Oil storage tanks on the Ellwood oil field west of the city of Santa Barbara, California, were bombarded by the Imperial Japanese Army. This attack by the Japanese submarine I-17 was the first attack on the continental America during the war.

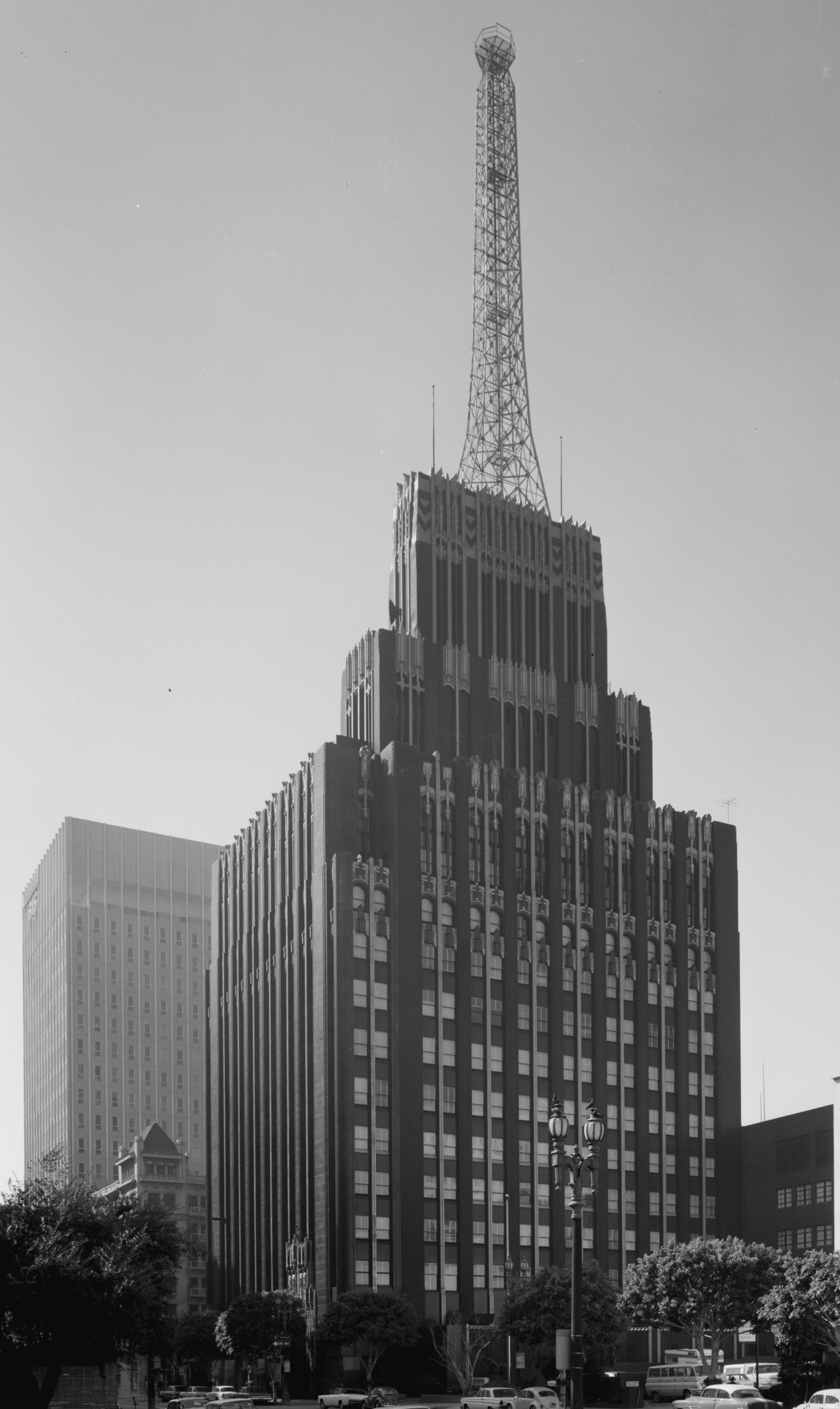
The 1929 Richfield Building in Los Angeles, designed by Morgan, Walls & Clements. It was demolished in 1969 to make way for the new ARCO Plaza.

Richfield Oil sponsored Disneyland's model freeway Autopia from 1955 to 1970.

The company merged with Atlantic Refining to form Atlantic Richfield Corp, later known as ARCO, in 1966. After spinning off Atlantic Refining to Sonoco, ARCO was purchased by BP plc in 2000.

The Richfield Oil Corp was the first to discover commercial quantities of oil in the state of Alaska. This occurred in 1957 on the Kenai Peninsula. Richfield's success at Kenai helped push their leasing tracks at Prudhoe Bay, which later served to hugely benefit the merged ARCO.

=== Merger with Atlantic Refining Company ===
Atlantic Refining Company found itself needing more oil production. It first merged with Hondo Oil & Gas Company in 1962 and, with the former Hondo president Robert O. Anderson at the helm of the merged companies, Atlantic Refining continued to look for good merger and acquisition partners. On a random fishing trip with Richfield Oil Chairman Charles S. Jones, Robert O. Anderson, by then Chairman of Atlantic, arranged a merger to form the Atlantic Richfield Company. The merger that would eventually become ARCO was completed in 1966.

== Company histories ==
Charles S. Jones. From the Rio Grande to the Arctic: The Story of the Richfield Oil Corporation. University of Oklahoma Press, 1972.
