= Bill Williams Mountain Men of Williams, Arizona =

Re-enacters

Founded in 1954, the Bill Williams Mountain Men of Williams, Arizona are a group of business people, doctors, judges and ranchers who re-enact the life and rides of 19th-century fur trappers. They dress in buckskin outfits, hats, boots or moccasins, and ride the trails to raise money for various charities and scholarships. The Bill Williams Mountain Men explore the mountains, canyons, and deserts of Arizona during their annual spring 200-mile Rendezvous Ride, held since they organized in 1954.

The group is named after "Old Bill Williams", a legendary fur trapper who hunted in the mountains of the area. They supported the creation of an eight-foot bronze statue of Williams, created by the sculptor by B. R. Pettit, to stand in a park honoring the mountain man in Williams, Arizona, which was named for him. In 1981 they presented a 16" copy of a bronze statue of Williams to the newly elected US president, Ronald Reagan, at his inaugural celebration. They ride the trail and sleep under the stars, re-enacting the rides and rendezvous of the trappers, who would come down from the mountains in the spring to sell their furs. The group participates in numerous parades and visits hospitals and schools to help keep the memory and adventures of the mountain men alive.
