= ARCO =

American oil company

Atlantic Richfield Company
- Logo used from 1970-2000, still used as a secondary logo

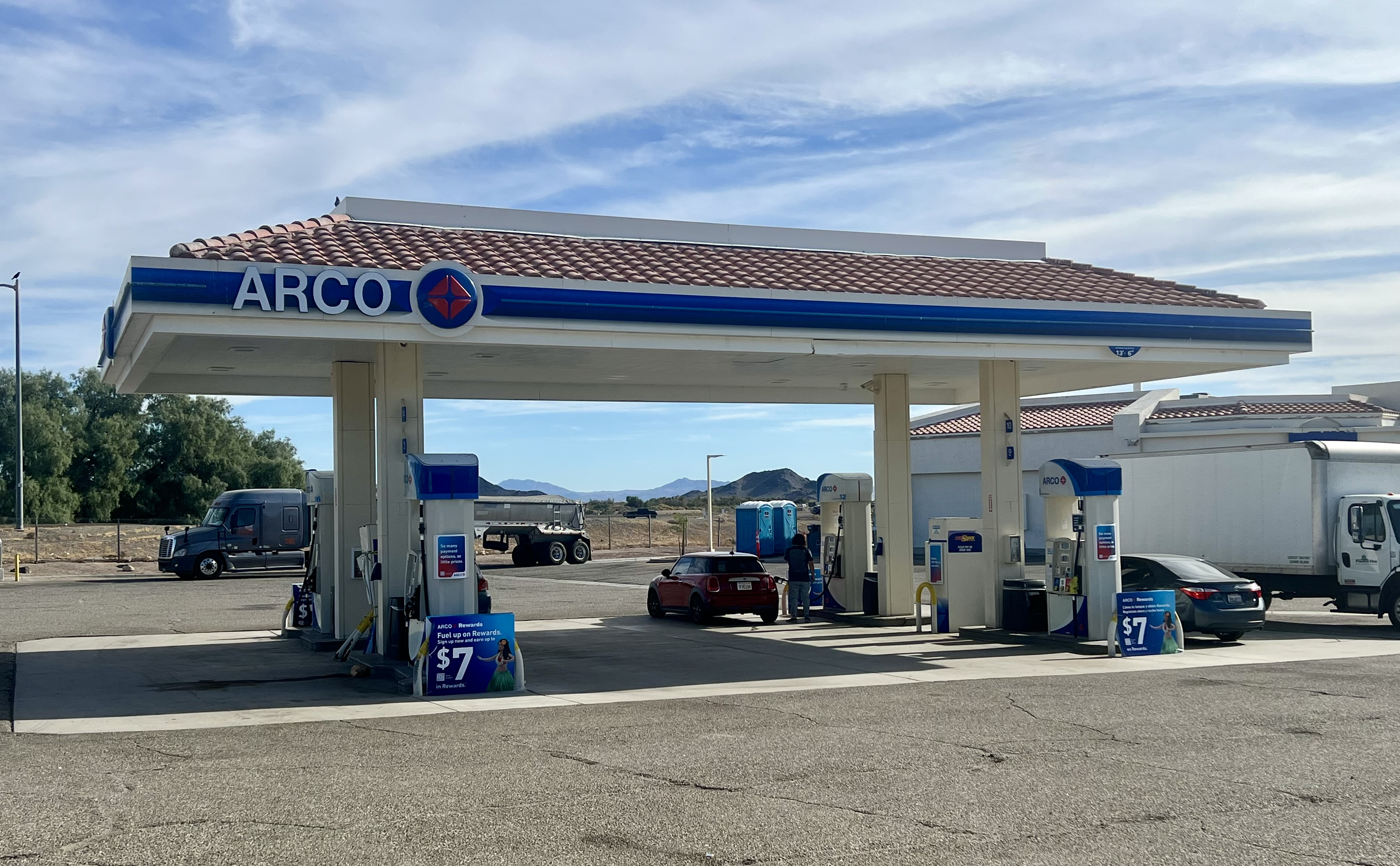
- ARCO station in Baker, California
- Type: Subsidiary
- Industry: Petroleum
- Predecessor: Atlantic Petroleum; Richfield Oil Corporation
- Founded: January 3, 1966; 60 years ago
- Defunct: April 18, 2000; 26 years ago
- Fate: Acquired by BP, brand now owned by Marathon Petroleum Corporation
- Headquarters: New York City (1966–1971); Los Angeles, California (1971–2000); Houston, Texas (2000–2012); San Antonio, Texas (2012–2018); Findlay, Ohio (2018–present)
- Number of locations: 1,200 (in 2000)
- Area served: United States
- Owner: Marathon Petroleum Corporation
- Website: arco.com

ARCO (/ˈɑːrkoʊ/ AR-koh) is a brand of gasoline stations owned by Marathon Petroleum which formerly owned the brand, uses it in California, Oregon and Washington, while Marathon has rights for the rest of the United States and Mexico.

ARCO was established in 1966 as the Atlantic Richfield Company, an independent oil and gas company formed from the merger of Atlantic Petroleum and the Richfield Oil Corporation. BP acquired ARCO in 2000, later integrating the production operations and selling the frontline retail operations with the ARCO name.

== History ==
From 1966 to 2000, the Atlantic Richfield Company, doing business as ARCO, was an independent American oil company with operations in the United States, Indonesia, the North Sea, the South China Sea and Mexico. After its acquisition of Anaconda Copper Mining Company in 1977, ARCO had owned hard rock mines in several western states, which has created environmental clean-up liabilities to the company to this day even after the mines were closed in the early 1980s.

In 2000, BP Amoco (now BP) acquired ARCO for $26.8 billion. ARCO's retail and marketing operations were kept separate while the rest of the company was integrated into BP.

In 2012, BP sold its Carson refinery, 800 ARCO stations in California, Arizona and Nevada, and the ownership of the ARCO brand to Tesoro for $2.5 billion while paying Tesoro for an exclusive license for use of the ARCO brand on its stations in northern California, Oregon and Washington which will be continued to be supplied from BP's Cherry Point Refinery in Washington state.

BP has retained the Atlantic Richfield Company as a subsidiary to handle environmental claims against BP for the clean-up of former Anaconda mine properties.

=== Early period ===
ARCO was formed by the merger of East Coast–based Atlantic Refining and California-based Richfield Oil Corporation in 1966; the company's name is an acronym of the two companies' names. A merger in 1969, brought in Sinclair Oil Corporation. In the 1970s and 80s, ARCO was one of the largest companies in the world, consistently a top 20 company of the Fortune 500. After its subsequent fracture in the late 1980s and early 90s, ARCO became a subsidiary of UK-based BP plc in 2000 through its BP West Coast Products LLC (BPWCP) affiliate.

- The Atlantic Petroleum Storage Company's heritage dates back to 1866. It became part of the Standard Oil trust in 1874, but achieved independence again when Standard Oil was broken up in 1911.
- In 1915, Atlantic opens its first filling station on Baum Boulevard in Pittsburgh, Pennsylvania.
- In 1917, First Richfield Oil Company of California gas station at Slauson and Central Avenues in Los Angeles, California. Richfield Oil Company of California logo is an Eagle trademark.
- The Atlantic Refining Company was headquartered in Philadelphia, Pennsylvania.
- In 1966, Atlantic merged with the Richfield Oil Company of California. The first CEO was Robert Orville Anderson, who had previously led Atlantic. The trademark for the new company, a red diamond shape called the ARCO Spark, was designed by Bauhaus artist, designer, and architect Herbert Bayer.
- Commercial oil exploration started in Prudhoe Bay, Alaska, in the 1960s, and the Prudhoe Bay Oil Field, North America's largest oil field, was discovered on March 12, 1968, by Atlantic Richfield Company (ARCO) and Exxon with the well Prudhoe Bay State #1. Key employees with ARCO Alaska were Marvin Mangus, John M. Sweet, and William D. Leake, chief project engineer for the Alaska pipeline. The Richfield Oil Company of California had purchased the drilling rights to the land where the discovery well was located. BP had drilling rights near the discovery well.
- ARCO acquired Sinclair Oil Corporation in 1969, but later divested certain Sinclair assets during the mid-1970s, resulting in Sinclair returning as a private company.
- In 1978, ARCO opened the first of its ampm convenience stores in Southern California.

=== 1980s ===
Due to the increasing cost in processing credit card sales, ARCO eliminated its own private credit card program and stopped accepting any bank credit cards, such as Visa and MasterCard, in 1982. In this way, the company was able to pass the resulting savings on to its dealers, which resulted in the company becoming the only major gasoline retailer to accept only cash at its stations.

In 1985, ARCO's East Coast stations were not doing very well so ARCO sold 400 service stations in eight states and the District of Columbia to Shell for an undisclosed price and also sold 576 service stations in Pennsylvania and New York plus a refinery in Pennsylvania for $420 million to Dutch trader John Deuss, who rebranded the stations to their former name Atlantic. Deuss later sold the stations plus refinery, pipelines and terminals in 1988 to Sunoco for $513 million.

In 1986, ARCO began to accept bank ATM cards (which later became debit cards) at its stations by adding on a transaction fee of initially 10 cents for those sales while maintaining cash-only sales at the previous low price.

=== 1990s ===
In the beginning of the 1990s, a subsidiary, ARCO Power Technologies, later Advanced Power Technologies (APTI), was the primary contractor for the High-frequency Active Auroral Research Program (HAARP Project). ARCO having hired Bernard Eastlund led to conspiracy theories about weather control and warfare. In March 1997, ARCO also leased almost all the gas stations of the (now) Santa Fe Springs, California–based independent Thrifty Oil group of 250 stations found throughout California after a damaging price war which the independent Thrifty was unable to win.

On July 5, 1990, an explosion at an ARCO Chemical Co. facility in Channelview, Texas killed 17 people and injured five others.

=== 2000s ===
On April 18, 2000, ARCO was purchased by BP and completely merged into BP operations. There were two exceptions due to FTC requirements: ARCO Alaska was sold by BP to Phillips Petroleum, and ARCO Pipe Line Company was acquired by TEPPCO, a subsidiary of Enterprise Products.

=== Headquarters buildings ===
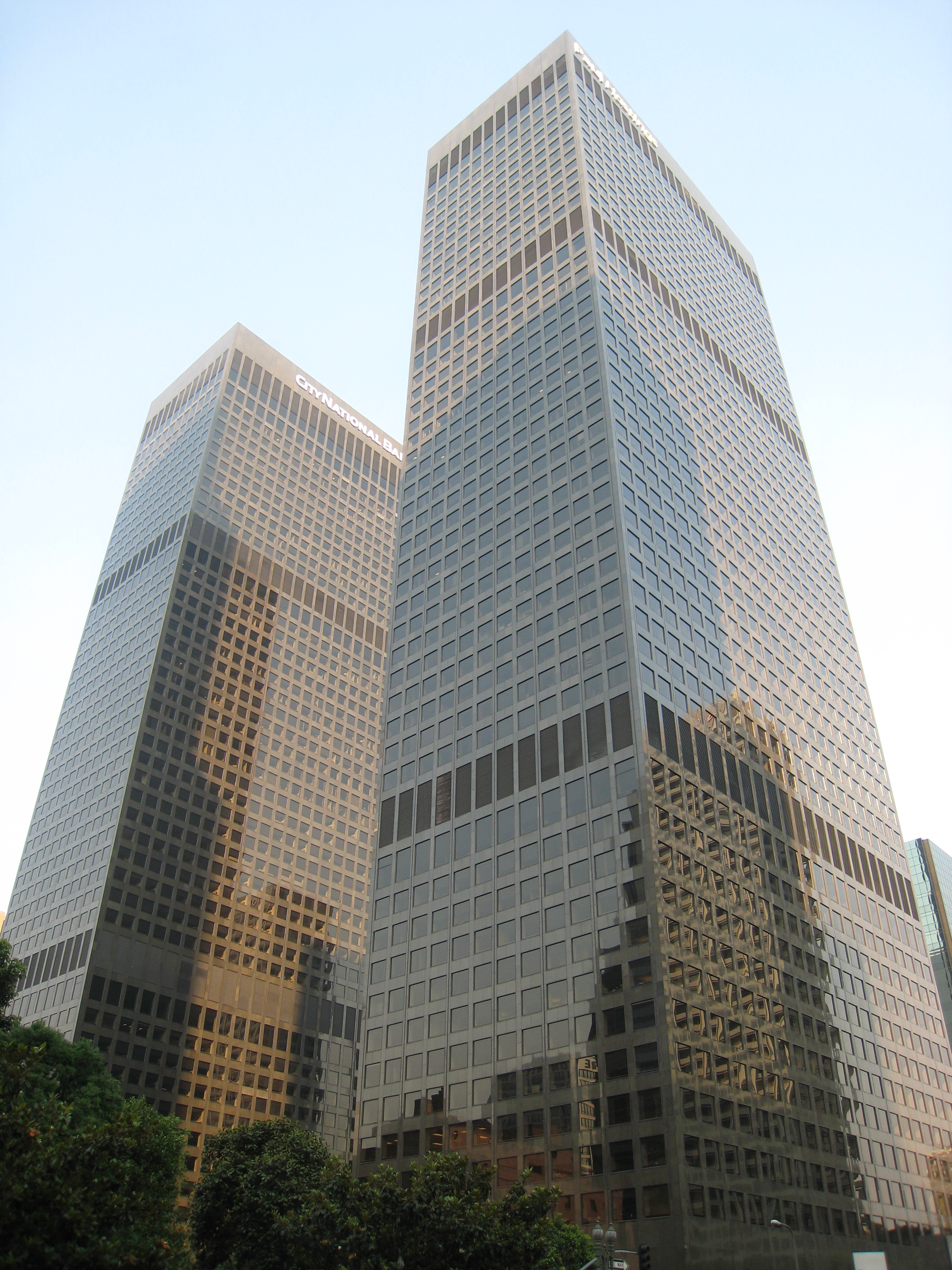
At one time, ARCO had its headquarters in what is now the City National Plaza complex in Downtown Los Angeles

From 1972 to 2000, ARCO's global corporate headquarters were in the ARCO Plaza in Los Angeles at the corner of 5th and Flower Streets, the site of Richfield's former headquarters. Upon completion in 1972, the ARCO Plaza towers were the tallest buildings in the city for one year before being overtaken by Aon Center, and were the tallest twin towers in the world until the completion of the World Trade Center in New York City. In 1986, joint owners ARCO and Bank of America sold the buildings to Shuwa Investments Corp., the American subsidiary of Shuwa Co. of Tokyo, for $650 million while both remained tenants in their respective named towers. ARCO moved out of the building in 1999. The building was renamed City National Plaza in 2005.

ARCO's Oil & Gas division headquarters were in downtown Dallas, Texas. ARCO Tower, the company's headquarters, was a 46-story office building designed by architect I.M. Pei. The building is now called Energy Plaza.

=== Research Laboratory ===
From the 1960s, until the end of the twentieth century, ARCO operated a highly significant research and development center in Plano, Texas, on land purchased in 1964 by the Atlantic Refinery Company. Its golden age was arguably in the early to mid 1980s, when it was led by Robert L. Hirsch. A standout example of ARCO's research at that time was the pioneering study on 4D seismic surveying by Robert Greaves and Terry Fulp. This consisted of repeated 3D seismic surveys which successfully mapped the effects of enhanced oil recovery processes as a function of time. This work was recognized for its seminal importance over 20 years later by the Society of Exploration Geophysicists. Besides Greaves and Fulp, the laboratory produced a number of other distinguished alumni during this golden age, including scientists John Castagna, Michael Batzle, Geoffrey Dorn, and Marius Vassiliou. In later years the laboratory experienced significant contraction. It finally closed shortly after the 2000 acquisition of ARCO by BP.

=== ARCO Solar ===
During the 1970s, the United States government and states such as California sought to encourage companies to invest in the development of low-pollution renewable energy sources. Oil companies such as BP, Shell, and ARCO began to look into photovoltaics. In 1977, ARCO purchased Chatsworth-based Solar Technology International, renamed it ARCO Solar, and moved it to Camarillo. In 1982, ARCO constructed the world's first photovoltaic central utility power plant, a 1-megawatt facility near Hesperia. Unfortunately for ARCO, the solar panel industry was costly and not very profitable, so it was looking for a buyer by 1989. It finally sold the company to the German company Siemens for $36 million in 1990.

=== ARCO Chemical ===
In 1987, ARCO Chemical Co. was spun off and taken public, with ARCO selling 19.9% to the public. Lyondell Chemical Company (now LyondellBasell), bought ARCO Chemical in 1998 for $5.6 billion including ARCO's entire 82.2% ownership stake.

=== Anaconda Copper ===
ARCO merged with Anaconda Copper Mining Company of Montana in 1977. Anaconda's holdings included the Berkeley Pit and the Anaconda, Montana Smelter. ARCO founder Robert Orville Anderson stated "he hoped Anaconda's resources and expertise would help him launch a major shale-oil venture, but that the world oil glut and the declining price of petroleum made shale oil moot". The purchase turned out to be a regrettable decision for ARCO. A lack of experience with hard-rock mining and a sudden drop in the price of copper to below seventy cents a pound, the lowest in years, caused ARCO to suspend all operations in Butte, Montana. By 1983, only six years after acquiring rights to the "Richest Hill on Earth", the Berkeley Pit was completely idle. By 1986, some ARCO properties were sold to billionaire industrialist Dennis Washington, whose company, Montana Resources, operates a much smaller open-pit mine east of the defunct Berkeley Pit.

==== Superfund site ====
ARCO was the responsible party (by its ownership of Anaconda Copper at the time operations were terminated) for the largest U.S. Superfund site—a site that takes in the towns of Butte and Anaconda, and 120 miles (190 km) of the Clark Fork River including Milltown Dam. The region's water and soil were polluted by a century of mining and smelting. Chemicals of concern include many heavy metals and arsenic. On 7 February 2008, the United States Environmental Protection Agency announced that prolonged litigation with ARCO ended when ARCO agreed to pay $187 million to finance natural resource restoration activities. Anaconda Copper still nominally exists, but only as a massive environmental liability for BP.

Atlantic Richfield Co and its then parent BP America agreed to settle a class-action lawsuit brought by about 700 current and former residents of Yerington, Nevada, who lived near the Anaconda mine built in 1941. The company paid in Nevada up to $19.5M for settlement. EPA tested in 2009 wells and found that 79% of the wells north of mine had dangerous levels of uranium and/or arsenic.

=== Legal issues ===
In September 2010, the staff of KCST-FM in Florence, Oregon, noticed that the station's Emergency Alert System (EAS) equipment would repeatedly unmute as if receiving an incoming EAS message several times a week. During each event, which was relayed from KKNU in Springfield, Oregon the same commercial advertisement for ARCO/BP gasoline could be heard, along with the words "This test has been brought to you by ARCO". Further investigation by the primary station transmitting the commercial revealed that the spot had been produced using an audio clip of an actual EAS header which had been modified to lower the header's volume and presumably prevent it from triggering false positive alert reactions in EAS equipment. The spot was distributed nationally, and after it had once been identified as the source of the false EAS equipment trips, various stations around the country reported having had similar experiences. After a widespread notification by the Society of Broadcast Engineers was issued, ARCO's ad agency withdrew the commercial from airplay.

=== Sponsorships ===
==== Sports ====
Starting in 1965, ARCO sponsored the ARCO Jesse Owens Games, an annual track meet for children aged ten to fifteen that was started by Olympics gold medalist Jesse Owens.

In 1980, ARCO became a sponsor of the 1984 Summer Olympics that were held in Los Angeles and had helped financed the refurbishing of the Los Angeles Memorial Coliseum.

In 1985, ARCO became a sponsor of the just-moved Sacramento Kings basketball franchise and had obtained the long-term naming rights for both their temporary and permanent homes, Original ARCO Arena and the purpose-built ARCO Arena. After BP acquired ARCO in 2000, BP decided not to renew the naming rights to the arena when the sponsorship was due to expire in February 2011.

==== Music ====
During the 1980s and 1990s, ARCO had sponsored the annual ARCO Concerts in the Sky summer jazz series at the Bonaventure Hotel in downtown Los Angeles.

== Leadership ==
=== President ===
1. Thornton F. Bradshaw, 1966–1981
2. William F. Kieschnick Jr, 1981–1985
3. Lodwrick M. Cook, 1985
4. Robert E. Wycoff, 1986–1993
5. Michael R. Bowlin, 1993–1998
6. Michael E. Wiley, 1998–2000

=== Chairman of the Board ===
1. Robert O. Anderson, 1966–1985
2. Lodwrick M. Cook, 1986–1995
3. Michael R. Bowlin, 1995–2000

== ARCO service station brand ==
Currently, the brand name ARCO is being used by Marathon Petroleum as a brand of gasoline service stations in the United States and Mexico. In Northern California, Oregon, and Washington states, the ARCO brand is licensed for exclusive use to BP for the sale of gasoline in those areas.

Any independent station can adopt the ARCO brand in any territory that is covered by the Marathon Petroleum distribution network outside the BP territories of the northwest.

It has more than 1,300 gas stations in the western part of the United States, and recently (as of 2017) five gas stations in northwestern Mexico.

=== History ===
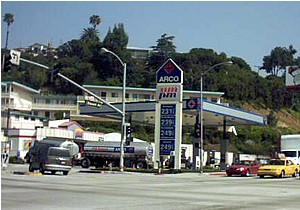
An ARCO filling station off Slauson Avenue in Los Angeles, California circa (2005)

After the Atlantic Richfield Company acquired Sinclair Oil in 1969, Atlantic Richfield decided to merge their three separate service brands into one and call it ARCO. $60 million was spent in the rebranding effort.

Over the course of 2004 and 2005, ARCO signs were replaced with signs that still had the ARCO spark, but BP's Helios (BP's new white, yellow, and green "sunburst" mark named after the Greek Sun god, replacing the old British Petroleum shield mark) is also located on the sign. A new tagline "ARCO—part of BP" also appeared on some signs and advertisements. ARCO was known for sponsoring the ARCO Arena (now Sleep Train Arena) in Sacramento, California, with a license fee of $750,000/year through 2007.

On August 13, 2012, it was announced that Tesoro would purchase ARCO and its refinery for $2.5 billion. The deal came under fire because of increasing fuel prices. Many activists urged state and federal regulators to block the sale because of concerns that it would reduce competition and could lead to higher fuel prices at ARCO stations (ARCO stations make up more than half of all stations with the lowest fuel prices in California). On June 3, 2013, BP sold ARCO and the Carson Refinery to Tesoro for $2.5 billion. BP sold its Southern California terminals (Vinvale, Colton, San Diego, Hathaway, and Hynes) to Tesoro Logistics LP, including the Carson Storage Facility. BP sold the ampm brand to Tesoro for Southern California, Arizona, and Nevada. BP exclusively licensed the ARCO rights from Tesoro for Northern California, Oregon, and Washington.

ARCO is known for its low-priced gasoline compared to other national brands, mainly because of an early 1980s business decision to emphasize cost cutting (cash/debit-only policy) and alternative sources of income (ampm). ARCO is headquartered in La Palma, California.

Tesoro was renamed Andeavor in 2017, and shortly afterwards introduced the ARCO brand for the first time in Mexico by the opening of ARCO branded stations in Tijuana. The introduction of the ARCO brand and other American brands in Mexico came after Mexico ended the monopoly of state-owned Pemex.

In spring of 2018, Andeavor began rebranding some SuperAmerica branded stations in North Dakota, South Dakota, Wisconsin and Minnesota to ARCO.

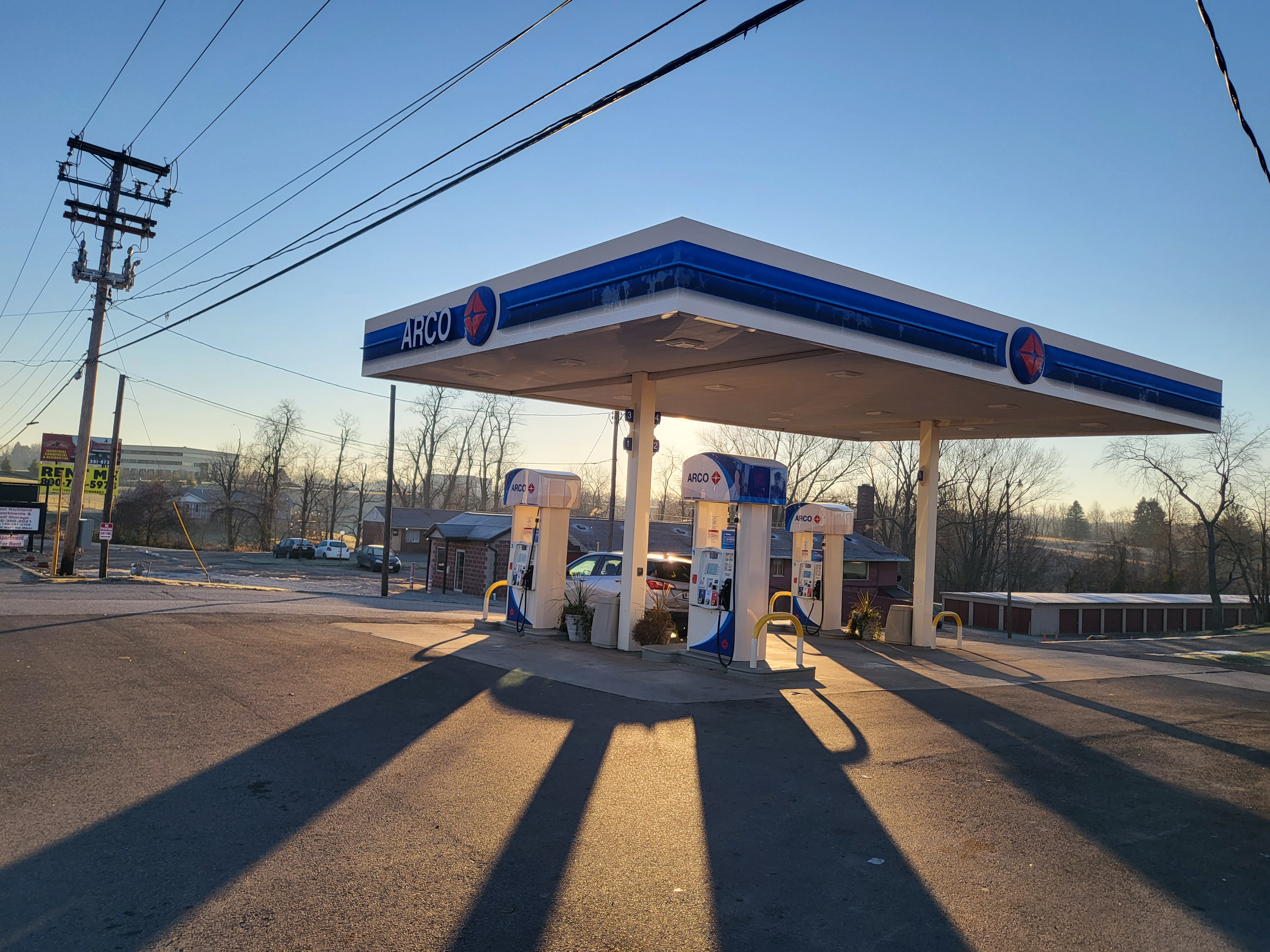
An ARCO station in St. Clairsville, Ohio in 2021, well out of ARCO's traditional marketing territory and in the home state of Marathon.

Andeavor was acquired by Marathon Petroleum in 2018. Following the acquisition, Marathon hinted at keeping the ARCO brand name while rebranding Andeavor's other brands either as standard Marathon stations (for franchised locations) or Speedway locations (for company-owned locations); stations still owned by BP may either remain as ARCO or rebranded as Amoco, as BP does not own the rights to the BP name due to licensing-based reasons in the Western United States. Following the merger, ARCO and Marathon began to be marketed together with Marathon stations replacing various Andeavor brands in the Western markets (including Exxon, Mobil and Shell stations under license with ExxonMobil and Shell, respectively) while ARCO returned to Eastern markets for the first time since 1985. Marathon ultimately sold Speedway to 7-Eleven in 2020, including some former Andeavor properties.

In 2021, ARCO reinstituted accepting credit cards, and engaged in an advertising campaign to inform consumers.

== See also ==
- ARCO Arena (1985) and successor venue ARCO Arena (currently the Sleep Train Arena) in Sacramento, California
- Conoco-Phillips Building in Anchorage, Alaska originally the ARCO Tower
- Harold Harby, employee of Richfield Oil and member of the Los Angeles City Council for all but one year from 1939 to 1957
