= Lodwrick Cook =

American businessman (1928–2020)

- Born: Lodwrick Monroe Cook III; June 17, 1928; Castor, Louisiana, U.S.
- Died: September 28, 2020 (aged 92); Sherman Oaks, California, U.S.
- Education: Louisiana State University (BSc 1950, BEng 1955); Southern Methodist University (MBA 1965)
- Military service
- Branch: United States Army
- Rank: First Lieutenant

Lodwrick Monroe Cook III (June 17, 1928 – September 28, 2020) was an American businessman and philanthropist. He was best known for his tenure from 1986 to 1995 as the chairman of Atlantic Richfield.

== Early life and education ==
Cook was raised in Grand Cane, Louisiana. He received a bachelor's degree in mathematics from Louisiana State University in 1950 and was also a member of the Sigma Chi Gamma Iota Chapter there. After service in the United States Army, Cook returned to LSU and earned a second degree in petroleum engineering in 1955. He later received a Master of Business Administration (MBA) from Southern Methodist University which he attended in the evenings. Louisiana State University, Pepperdine University, California Lutheran University, and St. Augustine's College have awarded Cook honorary degrees for charitable work and contributions. Cook was the father of five children (all adults) and had ten grandchildren. He lived in Sherman Oaks, California. His wife, Carole Diane Cook, died in 2010.

== Employment ==
Beginning in 1956, Cook was employed with Atlantic Richfield Company (ARCO), the seventh largest oil company in the United States. Cook was hired as an engineer trainee, but went on to hold several management positions in labor relations, refining, marketing and planning, rising to become a vice president of the company in 1970. After heading up ARCO's West Coast refining marketing operations, he chaired the eight-company Owners’ Committee building the Trans Alaska Pipeline System. When the multi-million dollar pump station burned, Cook proposed a solution of injecting a drag reducing agent to speed the flow, a success when implemented and resulting in the savings several hundreds of millions of dollars.

In January 1986, he became ARCO's chairman and CEO, succeeding the Robert O. Anderson. He remained in his position for nine years until, in June, 1995, he retired, becoming Chairman Emeritus.

In September, 1997, Cook became Vice Chairman and Managing Director of Pacific Capital Group, a venture capital, merchant banking group founded by Gary Winnick. The following year, in April, 1998, Cook was installed by Winnick as Co-Chairman of the Board of Directors of Global Crossing, a position Cook held until he stepped down in 2002 during the company's bankruptcy proceedings. Cook also served as chairman of Global Marine Systems beginning in 1999 and Asia Global Crossing in 2000.

In addition to ARCO and Global Crossing, Cook has served on the board of directors for Lockheed Corporation (until 1995), Castle & Cooke, the Kyle Foundation and Litex, Inc. He was also a member of the advisory committee of Aurora Capital Partners.

== Personal life ==
Cook was a member of the LSU Alumni Association's board of directors, an organization he had actively worked with and contributed to financially for many years. Through direct personal donations as well as his own fundraising efforts, Cook donated the money used by LSU for construction of an alumni center. The 11,000-square-foot (1,000 m^{2}), 128-room building was opened in a ceremony led by former president George H. W. Bush and named in honor of Cook's work. In addition to LSU, Cook was a member of the chancellor's court of benefactors for Oxford University in England and he was a Life Regent of Pepperdine University. He previously served on the board of advisors of the Carter Center of Emory University.

He was a trustee of the George Bush Presidential Library Foundation and a director of the Ronald Reagan Presidential Foundation. His financial contributions and work with the Library Foundation of Los Angeles led to the dedication of the Lodwrick Cook Rotunda within the library's downtown Los Angeles location.
