= Washington Society of Landscape Painters =

Coordinates: 38°54′23.94″N 77°2′4.17″W

- Interactive map of Washington Society of Landscape Painters
- Former names: Ramblers; Landscape Club of Washington
- Location: Washington, D.C. United States
- Type: Art society
- Event: Plein air

Construction
- Opened: 1913

Website
- Official website

The Washington Society of Landscape Painters is one of the United States' oldest fine art organizations. Founded in 1913, the group focuses on the plein air landscape painting tradition and is headquartered in Washington, D.C.

== History ==
In 1913, Washington painters Charles Seaton and Winfield Scott Clime began going on painting outings together. Soon, the group expanded, and by 1916 a regular group of landscape painters called the Ramblers were meeting. In 1919 they named themselves the Landscape Club of Washington, and met in the home of Florida Senator Duncan U. Fletcher. They held their first exhibition in October 1919 at Fletcher's home, could continue to exhibit there until the 1920s.

During World War II the group meetings declined, with occasional exhibitions still being held. The group held an annual banquet starting in 1927, only to stop holding it during World War II. It wasn't until 1976 when another banquet was held, and in 1996 the event became a steady event once again. In the 1950s selected members were outspoken about their dislike of modern art, and membership and press coverage fell during the 1960s and 1970s. In the mid 1980s activity increased again with an expanded exhibition schedule, more excursions and a number of memorial prizes being established. The group changed its name to the Washington Society of Landscape Painters in 1986, with the group hosting large painting on location events and member critiques quarterly. Historically, the group was only for male painters, in 1993, to commemorate its 80s birthday, the membership was opened to women.

== Notable exhibitions ==
- Chesapeake and Beyond: Paintings by the Washington Society of Landscape Painters, 2011; University of Maryland
- Historic Washington, DC : New Works by the Washington Society of Landscape Painters, 2011; American Painting Fine Art Gallery
- The Illuminated Landscape, 2011; Pepco's Edison Place Gallery
- "99 Years and Counting", January 17- February 23, 2012 Marlboro Gallery, Prince George's Community College, Mitcheville, MD. l Washington Society of Landscape Painters Archives, Volume 32
- "Ross Merrill Memorial Exhibit" March, 2012, American Painting Fine Art Gallery, Washington DC l Washington Society of Landscape Painters Archives, Volume 32
- "Washington DC, Inside-Outside" June–September 2012, American Painting Fine Art Gallery, Washington DC l Washington Society of Landscape Painters Archives, Volume 32
- "Eve of the Centennial" September 2012, Workhouse Arts Gallery, Lorton, VA l Washington Society of Landscape Painters Archives, Volume 32
- "European Adventures" October, 2012, American Painting Fine Art Gallery, Washington DC l Washington Society of Landscape Painters Archives, Volume 32
- "Centennial Exhibit 1913-2013, Paintings by Washington Society of Landscape Painters", April 2013, The Arts Club, Washington DC l Washington Society of Landscape Painters Archives, Volume 33
- "Celebrating 100 Years, Paintings by the Washington Society of Landscape Painters", July 2013, The McBride Gallery, Annapolis, MD l Washington Society of Landscape Painters Archives, Volume 33
- "Celebrating 100 Years, Paintings by the Washington Society of Landscape Painters", August–September, 2013, River District Arts, Sperryville, VA l Washington Society of Landscape Painters Archives, Volume 33
