= Robert Orville Anderson =

American businessman and philanthropist (1917–2007)

- Born: April 12, 1917; Chicago, Illinois
- Died: December 2, 2007 (aged 90); Roswell, New Mexico
- Education: University of Chicago
- Children: Phelps Anderson

Robert Orville Anderson (April 12, 1917 – December 2, 2007) was an American businessman, art collector, and philanthropist who founded Atlantic Richfield Company (ARCO). Anderson also supported several cultural organizations, from the Los Angeles County Museum of Art to Harper's Magazine. He died December 2, 2007, at his home in Roswell, New Mexico.

Anderson turned ARCO into the United States' sixth-largest oil company by the time he left in 1986 due to mandatory retirement. He was by then the largest individual landowner in the United States, with ranches and other holdings in Texas and New Mexico amounting to some 2,000 square miles (5,200 km^{2}) and a personal fortune estimated at $200 million.

== Early life and education ==
Anderson was born in Chicago on April 13, 1917, to Swedish immigrants Hugo A. Anderson and Hilda Nelson. His father was a prominent banker who, Anderson often said, was the first banker in the U.S. "who loaned money on oil in the ground."

Robert attended elementary and high school at the University of Chicago Laboratory Schools, and then continued his studies at the University of Chicago, majoring in economics and graduating in 1939. Anderson was an intellectual and considered becoming a philosophy professor. He was a member of the Omega chapter of the Psi Upsilon fraternity. During summers, he worked on pipelines in Texas. After graduating, he worked for the American Mineral Spirits Company, a subsidiary of Pure Oil. In 1941, his father helped him and his brothers buy a refinery in New Mexico.

== Career ==
By 1950 Anderson owned several refineries, had built a pipeline system, and had become a wildcatter. He entered the top ranks of independent oil producers in 1957 with a major find at the Empire-Abo field in New Mexico.

In 1963, Anderson merged his company Hondo into the Atlantic Refining Company of Philadelphia. In 1966, as Atlantic's chairman and chief executive, he merged with Richfield Oil of Los Angeles, forming Atlantic Richfield Company (later shortened to "ARCO". The company's headquarters were in New York City.

In 1967, he approved recommendations from ARCO Alaska staff including geologists Marvin Mangus and John M. Sweet. His approval led to ARCO's discovery of still the largest oil field yet found in North America at Prudhoe Bay on Alaska's North Slope. That oil field has produced billions of barrels of crude and accounts for a fifth of domestic oil production. Soon after, due to the wealth gained by the finding of Prudhoe Bay oil, he merged again with Sinclair Oil, forming the United States' seventh-biggest oil company.

Anderson led ARCO's move from New York City to Los Angeles in 1972, when it opened Atlantic Richfield Plaza on Flower street, which produced the twin towers of the city, for many years the tallest in the city.

Anderson's long-time friendship with Herbert Bayer, former Bauhaus Master, led to Anderson's interest and eventual passion for contemporary art. An enthusiastic collector, his personal collection spilled over into his offices. By the time he and ARCO moved to LA, the Atlantic Richfield Company Corporate Art Collection had grown to more than 3,000 works, consisting of original paintings, drawings, sculpture, limited edition prints and signed photographs.

The centerpiece of ARCO Plaza is the Sculpture Fountain designed by Bayer, entitled Double Ascension. It was said to have been named by Anderson with Bayer present. Apparently Anderson laughed out loud when he first heard the original title (saying he loved it, but doubted "the Board Members & Shareholders would appreciate a sculpture titled Stairs to Nowhere").

ARCO's nationwide art collection grew to over 15,000 original pieces under the direction of Herbert Bayer and ARCO Corporate Art Collection staff, with part of the collection housed in ARCO offices in cities other than Los Angeles. The collection was displayed throughout ARCO buildings, on both executive and working floors, in common areas, lobbies and offices as well as in many file and copy-machine rooms. ARCO was one of the first entities to utilize computer data-entry to keep track of and inventory a major art collection.

When asked why a Fortune 500 company should invest in modern art, Anderson replied: "Because I like it. It makes you think. I didn't get where I am because I took the same path as everyone else. One of the reasons ARCO is successful is that I encourage my people to look at all issues from every possible angle. That's one of the many reasons contemporary art is beneficial to society. It inspires you to think outside the box and use your imagination. If you examine a problem closely and think about all the possible solutions, you'll come up with the best possible answer. That's part of what made ARCO a success."

Anderson also led the seven-company effort to develop the Alaskan oil pipeline in 1974.

From 1966 to 1982, through acquisitions and strategic diversification, Anderson grew ARCO's revenues 20-fold (from $1 billion to over $20 billion). In 1985, with crude oil prices set to plunge and hostile corporate takeovers in the offing, Anderson led a major restructuring of Arco.

Upon mandatory retirement from ARCO in 1986, Anderson left to form Hondo Oil & Gas Company, Roswell, New Mexico, where he served as chairman and chief executive officer from September 1986 to February 1994.

== Philanthropy ==
He rescued two struggling publications, The Observer, and Harper's Magazine. He persuaded ARCO's board to purchase the Observer in 1977 when the publication was nearly bankrupt. He called it "a modest bet on the survival of England." In 1980, ARCO saved Harper's with a pledge of $1.5 million, which was matched by a similar amount from the MacArthur Foundation.

Anderson guided ARCO to play an important civic and philanthropic role in Los Angeles. The company donated $3 million toward the cost of a new building at the Los Angeles County Museum of Art. The building, which opened in 1986, was named for Anderson (it is now the Art of the Americas Building).

Anderson served as chairman of the Aspen Institute for Humanistic Studies, which convenes business executives and others to discuss world problems. He helped found the Worldwatch Institute in Washington to monitor global environmental trends, the International Institute for Environment and Development in London to study environmental and food issues, and the John Muir Institute of the Environment in Davis, California. Anderson was also an early sponsor/participant in the Agri-Energy Roundtable (AER), a UN-accredited forum regarding agricultural and energy issues. He received AER's "Food Security Man of the Year" Award in 1983.

== Personal life ==
He died on December 2, 2007, in Roswell, New Mexico. Anderson's son, Phelps Anderson, is a businessman and member of the New Mexico House of Representatives.

== Legacy and honors ==
- He was a lifetime trustee of the California Institute of Technology and the University of Chicago.
- 1974, the University of New Mexico's Robert O. Anderson School of Management was named after him.
- 1980, received the Golden Plate Award of the American Academy of Achievement.
- 1986, the new building at the Los Angeles County Museum of Art was named for him (it is now the Art of Americas Building).
- 1986, inducted into Junior Achievement's "U.S. Business Hall of Fame".
