= Missing trader fraud =

Type of Value Added Tax fraud

Carousel fraud, explained by the Dutch State

Missing trader fraud (also called missing trader intra-community fraud or MTIC fraud) involves the non-payment of Value Added Tax (VAT) to a government by fraudsters who exploit VAT rules, most commonly the European Union VAT rules which provide that the movement of goods between member states is VAT-free. There are different variations of the fraud, but they generally involve a trader charging VAT on the sale of goods and absconding with the VAT instead of paying it to the taxation authority. The term "missing trader" is used because the fraudster has gone missing with the VAT.

A common form of missing trader fraud is carousel fraud. In carousel fraud, VAT and goods are passed around between companies and jurisdictions, similar to how a carousel revolves.

== VAT rules ==
The usual operation of VAT is as follows: a business that buys and sells goods charges VAT to those to whom it sells ('output tax'), and is charged VAT by those from whom it purchases ('input tax'). It can reclaim (subject to various rules) the VAT it pays, and so passes to the government the net VAT it collects (being output tax less input tax). In this way, a business acts as a tax collector on behalf of the government.

Within the European Union, member states charge VAT at differing rates on goods as a form of indirect taxation. All exports of goods within the EU however are tax free. In other words, a business does not charge VAT on the sale of goods sold to buyers in another member state. This leads to the situation where an exporter will be able to reclaim VAT from their government, as it will have been charged VAT by the business from which it purchased the goods, and will owe the government nothing because it has sold the goods tax-free to a buyer in another member state.

Although missing trader fraud is most common in the EU as a result, it is also seen in other jurisdictions that have a value-added tax, such as Singapore.

== Operation of the fraud ==
The fraud exploits the VAT rules allowing the reclaiming of input VAT from the government at different stages in transaction chains.

=== Acquisition fraud ===
The simplest missing trader fraud is where a trader (Company A) imports some goods that are zero-rated in the country of origin; VAT on the goods should be paid in the country into which they have been imported. After importing, Company A sells the goods to another trader (Company B), charging the price of the goods plus VAT, but does not pay the VAT collected to the government; Company A becomes a "missing trader". The buyer, Company B, who has paid the VAT to Company A, can then reclaim the VAT paid from the tax authorities on its VAT return. Company B then sells the goods to Company C, which reclaims the VAT charged to it by Company B and declares the VAT it charges to its customer, Company D. Company D then sells the goods to the general public, reclaiming the VAT charged to it by Company C and declaring the VAT it charges.

In this situation, the fraudsters have obtained the value of the VAT charged by Company A to Company B. This situation, where the goods are made available for consumers in the importer's home market, is often known as "acquisition fraud".

The trader defaulting on its VAT liability (Company A in this example) is described as a "missing trader" or "defaulting trader", whereas the other traders in the transaction chain (Companies B, C and D) are "buffer traders". The role of the buffer traders is to distance the missing trader from the end consumer and make it harder for the taxation authorities to detect the fraud.

=== Carousel fraud ===
Carousel fraud is like acquisition fraud, except that the goods or services do not end up with an end consumer. Instead they are sold from one trader to another. Using the example in the previous section, say Company D (instead of selling the goods to the general public) sells the goods to Company E located in another member state of the European Union. Company D reclaims the VAT charged to it by Company C, but because the sale is zero rated it declares no output tax.

In this scenario, Company D is known as the "broker". The broker is able to claim back from the government all the VAT that would normally have been paid on the goods, as exports are zero-rated. However, because there is a "missing trader" further back in the chain of sales, part of the VAT whose refund is claimed was never actually paid.

The goods will now carousel through other traders in member states. The above process begins again, sometimes with different companies and sometimes with one or more of the companies being the same. The process can repeat many times, with the goods going round as if in a carousel.

=== Contra-trading ===
Contra-trading fraud is the further evolution of carousel fraud. The fraudsters evade government detection by using two carousels of traded goods where one carousel is legitimate and the other is not. The contra-trader's output tax from one chain is designed to off-set the input tax incurred on the other chain.

The two types of transaction chains are:

- "tax loss chains", where the contra-trader based in Country A incurs input tax on its purchases in Country A and makes zero-rated supplies of those goods to customers in other member states or exports to customers outside the EU; and
- "contra chains", where the contra-trader typically acquires goods from another member state and sells them on to traders in Country A, acting as an acquirer and generating an output tax liability from the onward sale.

The tax loss chains will trace back to a defaulting trader, or occasionally to another contra-trader (known as "double" or "multiple" contra-trading). The contra chains will end up with a broker (Company D in the example given in the previous section) who will sell the goods to traders located in another member state, allowing it to reclaim the VAT that should have been paid on the goods. The benefit of introducing contra-trading is that it makes it more difficult for the tax authorities to detect a connection between the VAT reclaim by the broker and the default by the missing trader, which now occurs in a different supply chain.

=== Role of other parties ===
In addition banks are used to make third-party payments. These obscure banks are called "platforms" and work on the escrow principle. This means money is uploaded and transferred immediately through the client accounts; it takes a day for the money to come out of the platform. The biggest platform was offshore First Curaçao International Bank (FCIB), which was closed by the Netherlands authorities in 2006. Using offshore platforms means that authorities cannot trace the money until they inspect books, and as the missing trader has already fled they cannot trace where the money was routed.

=== Hypothetical example ===
Trader A is based in Slovenia, a member state of the European Union. He buys a consignment of mobile telephones from a seller in France, another member state of the EU. Trader A pays the French seller €1,000,000 for the goods.

The goods are shipped to Slovenia. No VAT is charged by the French seller on that shipment because of the EU VAT rules described above. Trader A now sells those telephones to Trader B also in Slovenia, for €1,100,000 plus 20% VAT (€220,000). Trader B pays €1,320,000 to Trader A. Trader B then sells the goods to Trader C, still in Slovenia, for €1,200,000 plus 20% VAT (€240,000). Trader C pays €1,440,000 to Trader B.

The French seller may well be honest, but Traders A, B, and C are conspirators in the fraud. This may continue for many conspirators to better conceal the initial transaction; however, three will suffice for an example.

Trader C now sells the telephones to a German company, which may well be honest. No VAT is charged on intra-community trades, so the German company pays €1,500,000 free of VAT. So far the three conspirators have made altogether a legitimate profit of €500,000 on buying the mobile telephones for €1,000,000 and selling them for €1,500,000.

In an honest operation, Trader A should hand over the €220,000 it collected from Trader B to Slovenia's VAT collection agency. But Trader A does not report the collection or make the payment. Trader B paid €220,000 in VAT to Trader A but collected €240,000 in VAT from Trader C, so they hand over only the difference, €20,000, to Slovenia's VAT collection agency. Trader C paid €240,000 in VAT to Trader B and charged no tax on its sale abroad, so they reclaim €240,000 from Slovenia's VAT collection agency.

Trader A vanishes without handing over the €220,000 in VAT. When the last business in the chain collects the reclaimed VAT, all the conspirators can vanish with the €220,000. As the VAT reclaimed is not directly connected with Trader A, it is difficult for Slovenia's VAT collection agency to follow the links in the chain and justify refusing to refund the VAT on the intra-community sale.

In this scenario, Trader A is the "missing trader", Trader B is the "buffer" and Trader C is the "broker". In a real case there can be many buffers, all helping to blur the link between the final reclaim and the original importer, which will vanish. This entire series of transactions can occur without the goods ever leaving France before being re-exported. Furthermore, the same goods can go through the various buffers again and again, each pass around the 'carousel' bringing reclaimed VAT to the fraudsters.

== Types of products ==
The fraud lends itself to small, high value items, such as microchips, mobile telephones and CPUs. In 2002 it was reported that former employees of a company based in Stoke-on-Trent had first identified the opportunity of using mobile phones in this way, many of whom were subsequently investigated by the British police. In order to escape detection by the authorities, fraudsters would register companies for VAT without mentioning mobile phones. In some cases, fraudsters were caught out by claiming to trade mobile phones that had not yet been released for public sale. Due to efforts by the EU to combat fraud in relation to electronic goods in the late 2000s, fraudsters have since moved onto other asset classes such as precious metals, power, carbon emissions allowances and telecommunications. However, as recently as 2019, a large-scale mobile phone missing trader fraud was identified operating out of Hungary.

== Government response ==
MTIC fraud represents a real threat to government funds. In 2002–03 the estimated cumulative cost of such frauds to the UK alone was between £1.65 and £2.64 billion ($2.18 billion to $3.48 billion; €1.98 to €3.17 billion). Figures released in September 2006 by Eurocanet, a project sponsored by the European Commission, appear to show that the United Kingdom was the main victim of this fraud – the UK lost an estimated €12.6 billion during 2005–06 – followed by Spain and Italy, which each lost over €2 billion.

=== Denial of input tax claims ===
One option available to governments in the EU is to deny traders their right to deduct input tax using the Kittel principle developed in case law of the Court of Justice of the European Union (CJEU). In July 2006, the CJEU handed down its judgment in the case of Axel Kittel & Recolta Recycling SPRL (C-439/04 and C-440/04, issued 6 July 2006) (Kittel). In this case, the CJEU held that a taxable person can lose his right to reclaim input tax where "it is ascertained, having regard to objective factors, that the taxable person knew or should have known that, by his purchase, he was participating in a transaction connected with fraudulent evasion of VAT". The CJEU had previously clarified, in a decision called Bond House (C-354/03, C-355/03 and C-484/03, issued 12 January 2006), that a taxable person's right to deduct VAT is not affected by the possible fraudulent nature of other transactions in the chain, if the taxable person has no knowledge or means of knowledge of the fraud.

In 2020, the Government of Singapore proposed draft legislation that would allow the Inland Revenue Authority of Singapore to deny input tax credit to businesses on the basis that they knew or should have known that the supply was part of an arrangement to cause loss to the public revenue. The Ministry of Finance stated that this approach is similar to that taken in the UK and the EU.

=== Reverse charge mechanism ===
From 1 June 2007 the UK introduced changes to the way that VAT is charged on mobile phones and computer chips to help combat fraud in relation to these areas. The "reverse charge mechanism" now requires that the customer, rather than the supplier, account for VAT on the supply. In 2010, the reverse charge mechanism was extended to services in order to combat MTIC fraud in the carbon market. This means that the reverse charge applies to transactions in emissions allowances. On 1 August 2012 the European Commission adopted a proposal for a Quick Reaction Mechanism (QRM) that would enable member states to respond more swiftly and efficiently to VAT fraud. This means that member states can apply, within the space of a month, a reverse charge mechanism.

=== Current status ===
Notwithstanding these measures, MTIC fraud remains a problem for the EU. As at November 2018, calculations estimating the annual costs of the fraud range from €20 billion up to more than €100 billion (depending on methodology adopted). An EU Parliament study in October 2018 found that MTIC/carousel fraud is the most damaging type of cross-border VAT fraud with an estimated €50 billion losses on average per year.

On 16 May 2017, the Council of the EU adopted nine priorities for the fight against organised and serious international crime between 2018 and 2021. One of the priorities adopted was to disrupt the capacity of organised crime groups and specialists involved in excise and MTIC fraud.

In June 2017, the Canadian government revealed that it had been targeted by a carousel fraud, with the Canada Revenue Agency identifying $52 million in allegedly fraudulent requests for sales tax refunds and rebates over a five-year period. The scheme was orchestrated by fraudsters based in the United Kingdom, resulting in the tax authorities in both countries conducting a series of raids.

Missing trader fraud remains a problem for trade between the UK and the EU following the end of the Brexit transition period, since exports from the UK to the EU and vice versa are still zero rated for VAT. Moreover, since Northern Ireland effectively remains within the EU VAT regime, zero rating must be accounted for when moving goods from Great Britain to Northern Ireland (but not vice versa) if there is a risk of them being further moved to Ireland.
