= William Shirley Mathews =

Osage politician (1848–1915)

Member of the Osage Nation Tribal Council
- In office 1910–1912

Chief Justice of the Osage Nation courts
- In office 1890–1892

Osage Nation Treasurer
- In office 1882–1886

Personal details
- Born: September 15, 1848 Fort Gibson, Creek Nation, Indian Territory
- Died: March 15, 1915 (aged 66)
- Citizenship: Osage Nation
- Children: 8, including John Joseph Mathews
- Parent: John Allen Mathews (father)
- Relatives: William S. Williams (grandfather)
- Education: Osage Mission's post

William Shirley Mathews (1848 – 1915) was an Osage politician who served in several positions of Osage Nation government. He served as the Osage Nation treasurer between 1882 and 1886, chief justice between 1890 and 1892, and prosecuting attorney between 1894 and 1896, as well as on the tribal council from 1910 and 1912. He was also the father of John Joseph Mathews.

== Early life and career ==
William Shirley Mathews was born on September 15, 1848, in Fort Gibson, Creek Nation, Indian Territory, to John Allen Mathews and Sarah Williams (1816–1856), the daughter of William S. Williams and his Osage wife A-Ci'n-Ga. He was educated by Jesuits at the Osage Mission's post in St. Paul, Kansas. During the American Civil War, his father was a Confederate guerilla. At the age of twelve he rode to the Osage Mission to warn Father Schoenmakers that a gang of guerrillas led by his father was heading to the mission, saving the priests there. His father was killed by Union Army forces on September 19, 1861, leaving Mathews an orphan. He travelled to Texas with his brother Edward where they found work as cowboys.

They later worked the cattle trails and settled in the Cherokee Nation, Indian Territory. In 1874, Will and Edward moved to the Osage Nation after their removal to Osage County. He built a cattle ranch with his brother, which he worked until he lost a leg in an accident. Afterward he worked as a banker and merchant, buying a gristmill built by the United States and operating it until 1903. By 1907, Mathews had founded the Osage Mercantile Company, the most prominent general store in the Osage Nation.

== Osage Nation politics ==
Mathews served as the Osage Nation treasurer from 1882 and 1886, chief justice from 1890 to 1892, and prosecuting attorney from 1894 to 1896. During the allotment of the Osage Nation, Mathews served as a delegate to the United States Congress alongside other Osage leaders such as Bacon Rind, Fred Lookout, and James Bigheart, on four occasions. After Oklahoma statehood, he served on the Osage Nation tribal council between 1910 and 1912.

== Personal life and family ==
He married Pauline "Jennie" Eugenia Girardin 1887 in Osage County. The couple had eight children: Sarah Josephine (b. 1888), Susan Frances (1889–1891), George Martin (1891), William N. (1892–1895), John Joseph Mathews, Marie Imogene (b. 1897), Lilian Bernard (b. 1899), and Florence Julia (b. 1902). He died on March 15, 1915.

== Works cited ==
- Snyder, Michael (2017). John Joseph Mathews: Life of an Osage Writer. Norman: University of Oklahoma Press. ISBN 978-0-8061-5609-5.
