= John Joseph Mathews =

American novelist (1894–1979)

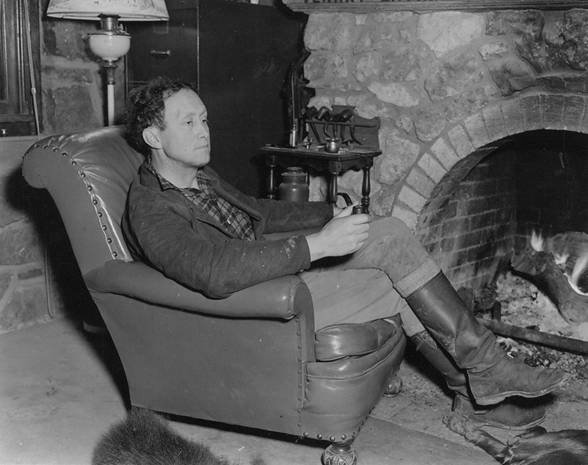
- Matthew in 1937

Member of the Osage Nation Tribal Council
- In office June 1934 – 1942

Member of the Oklahoma State Board of Education
- In office January 1935 – June 1936
- Governor: E.W. Marland

Personal details
- Born: November 16, 1894 Pawhuska, Osage Nation
- Died: June 16, 1979 (aged 84)
- Resting place: The Blackjacks, Tallgrass Prairie Preserve, Osage County, Oklahoma, U.S.
- Citizenship: Osage Nation; American
- Party: Democratic Party (United States); Progressive Party (Osage Nation)
- Children: 4, (Note: including his 2 step-children) including John, Virginia, and John Clinton Hunt
- Parent: William Shirley Mathews (father)
- Education: University of Oklahoma (BS); Oxford University (BA); University of Geneva (certificate)
- Occupation: Writer

Military service
- Allegiance: US
- Branch/service: United States Army
- Years of service: 1917-1919
- Rank: Second lieutenant
- Writing career
- Period: Modernist
- Notable work: Sundown (1934)

John Joseph Mathews (November 16, 1894 – June 16, 1979) was one of the Osage Nation's most important spokespeople and writers of the mid-20th century, and served on the Osage Tribal Council from 1934 to 1942. Mathews was born into an influential Osage family, the son of William Shirley Mathews an Osage Nation tribal councilor. He studied at the University of Oklahoma, Oxford University, and the University of Geneva and served as a pilot during World War I.

Mathews' first book was a history, Wah'kon-tah: The Osage and The White Man's Road (1929), which was selected by the Book-of-the-Month Club as their first by an academic press, became a bestseller. His second book, Sundown (1934) is his most well known, an exploration of the disruption of the people and their society at the time of the oil boom, which also attracted criminal activities by leading whites in the county and state, including murder of Osage.

His third book, Talking to the Moon (1945), has been compared to Henry David Thoreau's Walden and was written while living at The Blackjacks. The work is a reflection on his time living in Osage County. In 1951 Mathews published a biography of E. W. Marland, a noted oilman, governor of Oklahoma, and friend of Mathews. His book fifth book The Osages: Children of the Middle Waters (1961) was a life work, preserving many collected stories and the oral history of the Osage.

In 1996 Mathews was posthumously inducted into the Oklahoma Historians Hall of Fame. The Blackjacks in the Osage Hills, where he did much of his writing, was acquired in 2014 by the Nature Conservancy of Oklahoma to be incorporated into the Tallgrass Prairie Preserve. He is buried in his garden near the home.

== Early life and family ==
Mathews was born in Pawhuska, Indian Territory, on November 16, 1894, to William Shirley Mathews and Pauline Eugenia Girard, one of eight children. Three of his siblings died before adulthood. He had one older sister and three younger sisters who survived to adulthood. William Shirley Mathews was the son of John Allen Mathews, a blacksmith who settled among the Osage circa 1840 and later founded Oswego, Kansas, and Sara Williams. Sara was the daughter of A-Ci'n-Ga, an Osage woman, and William S. Williams. Because the Osage had a patrilineal kinship system, the Mathews descendants were excluded from belonging to one of the tribe's clans, as their Osage ancestry was through the maternal line of A-Ci'-Ga, rather than through a direct male ancestor. John Joseph Mathews' mother's family had immigrated from France. The family had an "active interest in Osage culture." The Mathews children were one-eighth Osage according to blood quantum laws. He was on 1906 Osage rolls and received one osage headright, like every member of the tribe.

Ancestors of John Joseph Mathews

4.John Allen Mathews
2. William Shirley Mathews
10. Old Bill Williams
5. Sara Williams
11. A-Ci'n-Ga
1.John Joseph Mathews
3. Pauline Eugenia Girard

== Education and World War I ==
=== University of Oklahoma and World War I ===
Mathews grew up in Osage County playing with his dog, Spot, and his horse, Bally. He attended Mrs. Tucker's Preparatory School, a local school founded for white children, and later Pawhuska High School in May 1914 where he played on the basketball and football teams. He attended the University of Oklahoma in the fall of 1914 and played on the freshman football team, but quit the team after one season. He joined Kappa Alpha Order in February 1915. He joined the Oklushe Degataga Indian Club when it was founded in 1914 and was one of two Osage members during his tenure. He took a short break from school in March 1915 when his father was ill and arrived home before his death on March 15, 1915. In the summer of 1916 he participated in an archaeology expedition near Grove, Oklahoma alongside notable Oklahomans such as Joseph B. Thoburn, Elmer Fraker, and Lynn Riggs. Afterward he traveled through South Dakota, Wyoming, Colorado, and Montana. Starting in 1916 he wrote for the University Oklahoman and in 1917 he wrote for the University of Oklahoma Magazine.

His schooling was interrupted when the United States entered World War I and he enlisted in the United States Army on May 9, 1917, hoping to be a cavalryman. He was later selected for ground school in Austin, Texas and then selected for bombing training. He never saw combat and left the army in the summer of 1919 as a second lieutenant, despite an offer to join the United States Army Air Service. He returned to the University of Oklahoma in the fall of 1919 and graduated in the spring of 1920 with a degree in geology. After graduation, he visited Yellowstone National Park with his family.

=== Oxford and Geneva ===
He was admitted to Michaelmas term at Oxford University, but skipped his first semester to go big game hunting in the Rocky Mountains. He arrived at Oxford in April 1921 for the Trinity term. While at Oxford, he traveled to England, Scotland, and France. While at Oxford, he met and befriended the Earl of Cardigan. In 1922, he traveled to Sidi Okba in Algeria, hoping to hunt the wild barbary sheep, but failed to find one, insteading shooting a barbary leopard. Later that year he visited Germany, Belgium, and Czechoslovakia. He graduated from Oxford in June 1923.

He spent the summer of 1923 attending the University of Geneva studying international relations and French. While there he attended meetings of the League of Nations and worked as a correspondent for the Philadelphia Ledger. There he met Virginia Winslow Hopper and the couple married on April 20, 1924. He studied again at Oxford in February 1924. While on his honeymoon, he ran into Hermann Goring at the Hotel de Russie in Rome. Their brief conversation greatly upset his wife and Mathews later claimed his first daughter was conceived trying to console her from the meeting. In November 1924, the couple returned to the United States.

== Return to the United States ==
=== New Jersey ===
Mathews and his wife returned to the United States in November 1924, first staying at the Hotel Edgemere in East Orange, New Jersey. By December they had found an apartment in Montclair, New Jersey, near his wife's family in Newark. While in Montclair, the couple hired a Black servant, Bobbie Green. On March 9, 1925, their first child, Virginia Mathews, was born. The family summered in Cape Ann, Massachusetts before moving to Pasadena, California that fall via the Panama Canal.

=== California ===
Mathews claimed later in life he went to California to work for Standard Oil, but was turned down for the job. A niece claimed he told family he went to be a screenwriter in Hollywood. Between 1927 and 1929, he worked in real estate, buying and selling land between Pasadena and Los Angeles.

On August 3, 1926, his first son, John Hopper Mathews, was born in Los Angeles. In September 1928, Mathews left his wife and children. He returned to his mother's home in Pawhuska for Thanksgiving. He returned to Pasadena in February 1929, telling his wife he was not coming back and began selling his land investments in California. In April 1929, while living in the University Club of Los Angeles, he wrote his first piece for Sooner Magazine, "Hunting the Red Deer of Scotland."

== Return to the Osage Nation ==
Mathews returned to Pawhuska in October 1929 and continued to write for Sooner Magazine until April 1933. After returning home, Mathews rarely mentioned his first wife and children. Historian Michael Snyder suggests that Mathews attempt to remove them from his biography was out of embarrassment of the failure of his first marriage and absence from his children's lives. His wife and child struggled to pay their bills, while Mathews was not obligated to pay support since the divorce was not finalized until 1941. In 1946, a court found he had failed to pay $225 in support.

=== Wah'kon-tah and Sundown ===
In addition to Sooner Magazine, he started writing the "Our Osage Hills" column for the Pawhuska Journal-Capital between 1930 and 1931 and joined the Izaak Walton League. His friends, Joseph A. Brandt and Walter Campbell, encouraged him to write a book.

His first book, Wah'kon-tah:The Osage and the White Man's Road, was published in November 1932. The work, published with the University of Oklahoma Press, was the first work by an academic press to be selected by the new Book-of-the-Month Club, and the book became a bestseller. It is based on the diaries and letters of Major Laban J. Miles. Miles had given Mathews his diaries before his death in 1931 and Joseph A. Brandt encouraged him to write a book based on them. He wrote the book between July 4, 1931, and November 1931. In January 1932, Thomas Gore arranged for Mathews to meet Herbert Hoover, to see if the president would write the introduction for his book. Hoover met with Mathews and told him about his time in Oklahoma and with the Osage, but did not write the introduction. Snyder notes Mathews did not meet with Charles Curtis, who was part Osage, likely because Mathews, a Democrat, did not agree with his pro-assimilation policies towards Native Americans. After returning home in the summer of 1932, he built his home, which he dubbed "The Blackjacks," in the Osage Hills. When the novel became a bestseller in January 1933, Walter Ferguson and his wife Lucia Loomis hosted a large celebration for Mathews in Tulsa at their home.

His most well-known work is Sundown (1934), his only novel. Mathews is described as introducing "the modern American Indian novel", a pattern for future works by Native American authors. It is marked by its realism, as Mathews wanted to represent the Indian in a way that had not been recognized in European-American cultural stereotypes. The novel was written rather quickly between 1933 and 1934, after being solicited by the publisher Longmans, Green, and Co. The book was published in November 1934. Mathews maintained he wrote the book "without any inspiration" and that he never fully read it after publication. Although he later admitted he read part of it in 1948 and found it "not in the least bad."

The semi-autobiographical work is about Challenge "Chal" Windzer, a young Osage man of mixed-blood ancestry. After leaving home to study at the University of Oklahoma and serve in the military, Chal feels estranged when he returns to his tribal community. He suffers from alienation and hopelessness as his life takes a downward swerve. The novel is set during the turbulence of the oil boom that took place on Osage land in Oklahoma in the early 1900s, which generated great wealth for the many Osage enrolled citizens who had Osage headrights. It portrayed some of the Osage Indian murders during the 1920s, a period they termed the "Reign of Terror", as white opportunists tried to get control of the Osage headrights.

=== Osage Nation Tribal Council ===
Mathews was elected to the Osage Nation tribal council in June 1934 served two four year terms, representing the Progressive Party, during the tenure of Principal Chief Fred Lookout. His tenure was not popular among the Fullblood Party, which argued the tribe overvalued Mathews's education and gave him too much power. The Great Depression hit the Osage Nation hard, with Osage headright payments declining from $23,000 in 1921 to $500 in 1932. He was a strong supporter of John Collier and the Indian Reorganization Act of 1934. In October 1934, he organized debates between Collier and Oklahoma Senator Elmer Thomas over the "Indian New Deal," with Thomas advocating against the act. Mathews and Thomas competed over convincing the Osage Nation whether to support the act, with Mathews eventually be successful.

Mathews also served on the Oklahoma State Board of Education after he was appointed by E.W. Marland to the role in January 1935. He was asked to resign after 18 months for being under qualified to serve on the board. In April 1937, he wrote and hosted the radio program Romance of the Osages. The next month, he generated controversy for saying in an interview with the Tulsa World: "Greed, the white man's greed, has caused the Indians many griefs. Unscrupulous men have stooped pretty low at times to get hold of Osage money." After proposing a tribal museum, he was able to acquire funding from the Works Progress Administration for the Osage Nation Museum (then the Osage Tribal Museum). After starting construction in the summer of 1936, the museum was complete in 1938. It was the first ever tribally owned and operated museum. Following the construction, he organized WPA funding for portraits to be made of fullblood Osage elders.

From November 1939 to March 1940 Mathews lived and studied in Mexico on a Guggenheim Fellowship. In April 1940, Mathews returned to Mexico to serve as the Oklahoma representative to the Indians of the Americas Conference in Michoacan, Mexico. He stayed after the conference to complete his fellowship and eventually returned home in August after recovering from malaria.

=== Second marriage ===
After returning to Pawhuska in 1929, Mathews met Henry and Elizabeth Hunt. They had two children, John Clinton Hunt and Ann Hunt. On August 11, 1932, Henry shot himself. Historian Michael Snyder suggests that Mathews, Henry, and Elizabeth were all close friends and there may have been an affair between Mathews and Elizabeth that contributed to Henry's suicide. Eleven weeks after Henry's death, Mathews was writing love letters to Elizabeth. The couple married in April 1945. Mathews treated his two step-children as his children.

Elizabeth worked with him on much of his research related to the Osage and their forced migration from Missouri to Oklahoma. She died on November 7, 1982.

== Later writing ==
=== Talking to the Moon ===
Later, Mathews concentrated again on his writing. His work Talking to the Moon (1945) is a retrospective account of the ten years he spent in the "blackjacks" of his homeland, observing nature and reflecting on the influence of the environment on Osage culture. He wrote much of this in the stone cabin, The Blackjacks. This area is now preserved as part of the Tallgrass Prairie Preserve. The book is a combination of autobiography, philosophical treatise, and observations by an amateur naturalist. Some critics compared it to Henry David Thoreau's Walden. Lee Schweninger noted that Mathews used irony to create distance between the narrator and himself as the subject of autobiographical reflection. He also wrote about himself as a settler, and critiqued European-American culture, while committing actions similar to those of other settlers who disrupted the natural balance. It was Mathews favorite of his work.

=== Life and Death of an Oilman ===
In the 1930s, Mathews considered writing a biography for his friend, E. W. Marland. He described himself as "an admirer and observer" of Marland. The two first met in 1908 when Marland came to bid at the "Million Dollar Elm" in Osage County, and ran in similar social circles. He worked on the biography between 1932 and 1951. During publication, it was moved between three publishers:the University of Oklahoma Press, University of Chicago Press, and Henry Holt. By 1945, Chicago was set to publish the novel at the end of the year, but Mathews missed this deadline and a 1946 extension. By 1948, Chicago had cancelled the contract. After brief talks with Oklahoma and Holt, Mathews submitted Life and Death of an Oilman: The Career of E. W. Marland in 1949 to Chicago and the book was published in October 1951.

Mathews's Life and Death of an Oilman: The Career of E. W. Marland (1951) was his only biography; it explores the life of a multi-millionaire Oklahoma oilman and politician, who also served as governor of the state in the 1930s. He created a social scandal by marrying his much younger adoptive daughter, Lydie Marland. Historian Michael Snyder notes that Mathews avoids discussion of Marland's first wife Virginia in great detail and that Mathews editors asked him to add more, but he was resistant to these suggestions.

=== The Osages ===
Based on years of collecting information from tribal elders through the oral tradition, in addition to conducting historical research, Mathews wrote The Osages: Children of the Middle Waters (1961). It has been described as "his magnum opus and a pioneering achievement for both its reliance on the oral tradition and presentation of a particular tribal history from an Indian point of view." His book was the product of his working with tribal elders to preserve and interpret their common culture.

== Later life and death ==
In 1952 and 1953, Mathews fought against efforts to terminate the Osage Nation in the United States Congress. He helped lobby the entire Oklahoma Congressional Delegation to oppose the bill while staying with his younger sister Florence's husband Michael Feighan. In 1957 he supported extending voting rights in Osage Nation elections to out of state members, but opposed extending voting rights to non-Osage headright holders.

He spent his later life working on a three-volume autobiography. At least two volumes were completed, with the first posthumously published and the second believed lost in an auction of Mathew's family papers in 1992.

Mathews died on June 11, 1979, in Pawhuska and was buried at his request in his garden near the cabin in the Osage Hills where he did much of his writing.

== Legacy and honors ==
=== Posthumous works ===
Two books of Mathews have been published posthumously, in efforts to bring his work to a wider audience. Another autobiography, Twenty Thousand Mornings was published in 2012, edited by Susan Kalter.

In the 1960s Mathews wrote a number of short stories, some drawing from folk traditions of the Osage and other cultures, including Scotland. Selected stories from these unpublished manuscripts were published in 2015 as Old Three Toes and Other Tales of Survival and Extinction. Mathews told these stories from the point of view of bird and animal protagonists, an act of imagination that decenters human life.

=== Awards ===
Mathews is sometimes cited as a Rhodes Scholar, but this is erroneous. The first Osage Rhodes Scholar was Carter Revard in 1952.

In 1996, Mathews was posthumously inducted into the Oklahoma Historians Hall of Fame.

=== The Blackjacks ===
The stone cabin where Mathews did much of his writing, The Blackjacks, is in the Osage Hills. The cabin and gravesite were acquired about 2014 by the Nature Conservancy of Oklahoma and added to its Tallgrass Prairie Preserve, which it administers.

== Works ==
- Wah'kon-tah: The Osage and The White Man's Road (1929)
- Sundown (1934)
- Talking to the Moon (1945)
- Life and Death of an Oilman: The Career of E. W. Marland (1951)
- The Osages: Children of the Middle Waters (1961)

The following were published posthumously:

- Twenty Thousand Mornings (2011), autobiography, ed. Susan Kalter
- Old Three Toes and Other Tales of Survival and Extinction (2015), short stories, ed. Susan Kalter

== Works cited ==
- Snyder, Michael (2017). John Joseph Mathews: Life of an Osage Writer. Norman: University of Oklahoma Press. ISBN 978-0-8061-5609-5.
