= Sundown (novel) =

1934 novel by John Joseph Mathews

- Cover of paperback edition; painting by Mars Biggoose
- Author: John Joseph Mathews
- Cover artist: Mars Biggoose
- Language: English
- Set in: 1880s–1920s
- Published: 1934 (1st ed.) & 1988 (Paperback ed.)
- Publisher: Longmans, Green, and Co. (1934) University of Oklahoma Press (1988)
- Publication place: United States
- Media type: Novel

Sundown is a 1934 novel by the Osage writer John Joseph Mathews. Set in the Osage Nation and Osage County, Oklahoma, the novel follows the life of a "mixed blood" (Note: Native American tribes in the United States are regulated by blood quantum laws. Historically, "full blood" colloquially refers to Native Americans who were legal recognized as having 100% Native American ancestry and "mixed blood" refers to anyone with non-native ancestors.) Osage boy named Challenge Windzer as he navigates the conflicts between Osage traditionalism and assimilationism during the early 20th century.

== Plot ==
Challenge Windzer is born to a "full blood" Osage mother and a "mixed blood" Osage father, John Windzer. John names his new son "Challenge" because "he shall be a challenge to the disinheritors of his people." Challenge grows up close to nature, often imagining himself as various animals, but also envisions himself as a soldier of the American Revolution from the history books his father reads. He learns about Jesus and Christianity from his white aunt and imagines a young Jesus as his imaginary friend whom he shows the Osage Hills. When his aunt gifts him several photos of Jesus he dislikes the Roman soldiers in the illustration of the crucifixion and decides to cut them out of the photo, but is surprised when his aunt angrily calls him a "little savage" for cutting her gift. Chal later begins attending the local school and spends his summers with his friends Running Eagle and Sun-on-His-Wings riding horses.

White people begin to move into the Osage Reservation and the novel discusses the allotment of the reservation and negotiations for Osage headrights through Chal's father who serves on the Osage Nation tribal council during negotiations. Oil derricks and railroads begin to cross the reservation as Chal describes how he conceptualizes civilization as "the most delicate white woman he could imagine" and contrasts this with the Blackjacks which remind him of "the fullbloods" as "they stood proudly in their gorgeous red, yellow and orange in the brilliant sun of autumn." While riding out in the prairie, Chal is stuck in a thunderstorm and encounters Sun-on-His-Wings and an Osage elder, Black Elk, after they have completed a traditional Osage ceremony. (Note: Matthews describes the ceremony in the novel with the text "They had seen the storm coming and had ridden out to the hill so that they might be visible to Wah 'Kon-Tah, and manifest their bravery by defying the storm, but ready to die by a bolt of lightning if it pleased the Great Mysteries. There was some reason why they had ridden out. Perhaps it was because Wah 'Kon-Tah had manifested his displeasure in some way, and they had wanted to show him that they were still Osages and were not afraid to dies; that they would sacrifice themselves if he wished it for the benefit of the tribe.") When the three return to town, they find lightning has struck an oil derrick in town and set it on fire.

Chal attends the University of Oklahoma initially alongside Running Elk and Sun-on-His-Wings, but they both drop out after refusing to be paddled to join a fraternity despite being talented members of the football team. Chal accepts the paddling and joins the fraternity, but feels alienated at the University and frequently goes on walks by himself through nature. Despite feeling alienated, Chal frequently attends social events and dances while going on dates with the popular Blo Daubeney. When Chal returns home for the summer he finds Running Elk is now a drunk and Sun-on-His-Wings has converted to the Native American Church and only participates in their dances and peyote ceremonies. He talks with his mother about the potential of the United States entering World War I and she suggests he join as a cavalryman. Chal replies to his mother that he will instead become a pilot in the war and "shall fly in the air, like a bird."

While riding through the Osage Hills he runs into his geology professor, Mr. Granville, and the pair converse while birdwatching. Afterwards, Chal invites Granville to lunch at his family's ranch. They meet the tenant farmers, Cal Carroll and Mrs. Carroll, who live on the ranch and eat lunch together while Cal questions Granville about his home in England. Afterward Chal returns to the University. Mr. Granville gives him a letter of introduction to a Captain and encourages hims join the United States Army Air Service. That night, he packs his bags at the fraternity house, leaves a note saying "I guess I am going to fly," and goes to join the army.

Chal attends the six-week ground school and easily passes while many of his cohorts struggle to get through the classes with passing scores and fail out, including an All-American. He's initially trained by Metz at the flight school in two pilot planes, but he is killed when one of his students makes a mistake. Chal is curtly informed of Metz death by his replacement, a lieutenant, and quickly moves on to the solo flying school. He runs into now Major Granville, moves onto night flying school, and then is made an instructor at the night school.

While in school he has an affair with Mrs. Lou Kerry. While a night instructor, he receives a note from her saying she is staying at the Spanish Main hotel. One night after class Chal, now a lieutenant, orders Major Meyer to help him take a plane. The pair fly and land the plane on the beach near the hotel and Chal leaves a note at the hotel's desk telling Lou he came to visit her, but she wasn't awake when he came by at 3:15 a.m. Lou writes back asking Chal to repeat the act and climb up through her window one of the follow nights, which he does.

When his father is killed, he returns home on leave. Chal and his mother discuss how his father was found with a gun in his hand. He retires from the military a few months after his leave and returns home. He inherits thousands of dollars from his father and manages to avoid being scammed out of it by various schemes. He buys a car and begins to drink more often. One day he attends a peyote ceremony with Sun-on-His-Wings. During the ceremony, various Osage discuss the Osage Indian murders and Chal learns that Running Elk was murdered by white people.

Chal spends more time in nature and he drinks even more frequently. At the same time, murders and suicides become more frequent with many of Chal's acquaintances dying. After returning home from a bender, Chal tells his mother he wants a change and is going to Harvard Law School.

== Historical context ==
Sundown begins in Osage County around 1900. At this time, it was standard for the Osage Nation to have collective control and ownership of their land. In 1904 and 1905, large amounts of oil were discovered on Osage land, and the Osage Allotment Act soon followed in 1906. The Osage Allotment Act ensured that each legal member of the Osage Tribe would be entitled to a headright share in the distribution of funds from the Osage mineral estate, with the intention of protecting the interests of the Osage people. As a result, Osage citizens became the richest people per capita in the 1920s. Challenge, the protagonist of Sundown, inherits large amounts of wealth when his father is murdered during a time period commonly known as the Osage Reign of Terror. During this time, the Osage Nation was plagued by schemes and murders committed by White opportunists who were attempting to swindle headrights and gain control of the wealth held by certain enrolled members of the Osage Tribe. It is reported that 1 to 3 percent of the Osage were murdered from 1918 to 1931. Sundown is one of the earliest works to cover the Osage Indian murders.

Louis Owens argued that Sundown was named in reference to Ernest Hemingway's novel The Sun Also Rises.

== Themes ==
=== Modernism and modernity ===
Sundown is a semi-autobiographical novel where the main character, Challenge Windzer, closely mirrors the author, John Joseph Mathews. Christopher Schedler describes it as a mix of "high" and "border" modernist aesthetics to create Native American modernism. With "high" modernism's focus on the individual and distance from the world outside of the subject, Mathews uses Chal as a "high" modernist figure to show how this "identity" is incompatible with traditional, communal Osage culture. Mathews combines this "high" modernist subject with a "border" modernist setting, which puts emphasis on historical context and the external world. Schedler states that Mathews uses Euro-American modernist themes and Native American storytelling conventions to form Native American modernism.

The production of oil provided stability to Americans, yet both destruction to Osage culture and reconstruction to Osage wealth. In "Sundown and 'Liquid Modernity' in Pawhuska, Oklahoma", Hanna Musiol calls out the discovery of oil for its destabilizing effects on Osage reservation culture in favor of forced modernization. Musiol states that "Sundown emphasizes the transnational, colonial conditions of Osage oil culture, which, paradoxically, financially enriched the Osage oil in the early twentieth century." The complexity in the Osage People's relationship with oil within Sundown showcases a shift into modernity.

=== Individualism ===
Sundown takes place during the Allotment Era following the Dawes Act of 1887. The purpose of the Act was to assimilate Native Americans into American society by trading their communal culture for an individualist lifestyle. Although capitalism and individualism were heavily imposed on the Osage people, they maintained "collectivist modes of wealth distribution." Jennifer Gillian suggests that the Osage people in Mathews' novel sought to compensate for their loss of tribal power with the acquisition of luxury goods using their individual wealth. Chal Windzer enjoys the perks of the middle class, but lacks any actual power. Gillian stresses Mathews' depictions of mass consumption only offers figurative power to the Osage.

=== Race and identity ===
Carol Hunter makes the claim that John Joseph Mathews is one of the first authors to portray an assimilated mixed-blood Osage protagonist as an outcast. "Mixed-bloods," as characterized by John Windzer in the novel, advocated for assimilation and progress. "Full-bloods" were seen as "backwards" or "uncivilized" for rejecting settler culture, as portrayed by Chal's mother. Hunter claims that clan lineage is passed on patrilineally; therefore, Chal's father's rejection of Osage tradition leaves Chal clanless.

=== Gender and queerness ===
The "detribalization" of the Osage during the Allotment Era caused a subversion of gender roles in Osage society, as claimed by Jennifer Gillian. The push for a nuclear family removed the traditional tribal roles of men and women. Sean Teuton asserts that Euro-American notions of gender roles preserve many roles that Native women performed, but "deprived men of their traditional masculinity." According to Teuton, Mathews portrays this in Chal as he escapes into a "mystified Osage masculinity" and develops homo-social male relationships. Michael Snyder claims that Mathews' use of the word "queer" and Chal's feelings of peculiarity and alienation in the novel implies that the protagonist has same-sex desires.

=== Space and time ===
Alexander Steele describes the differences between colonial and Indigenous perceptions of time and how Challenge Windzer interacts with his sacred spaces. The way both groups view time is dependent on their "statuses of land" and interaction with the ecospaces, which have sustained Indigenous tribes for generations. The cultural significance of space and time in Sundown is shown in Chal's disorientation when he returns from university and sees how much the landscape has changed since the oil frenzy.

Steele highlights how Mathews was able to overlap themes throughout his novel. He asserts that the novel "lays bare the irreconcilability of multiple embodied historical consciousness at the odds with and overlapping on another" and points out how Mathew's Sundown was able to set historical consciousness with a fictional character and setting.

== Reception ==
April Anson compares Mathews' Sundown with David Grann's Killers of the Flower Moon. To Anson, both texts "regard the Osage Reign of Terror as a gruesome example in a long history of structural violence linking the settler state to land theft and resource extraction." However, Sundown offers readers a different story "beyond the tragic history of Grann's vital study to articulate –quietly profoundly –with Indigenous resistance today." The novel's ability to draw from resistance attitudes for environmental protection in the name of "Indigenous sovereignty and survivance" proves the text to be timeless.

Robert F. Gish holds similar sentiments. In his book review in American Indian Quarterly, Gish paints D'Arcy McNickle's Wind from an Enemy Sky and Sundown by John Joseph Mathews as necessary reads due to their portrayals on "how pervasive and mind-preying the myth of 'the vanishing American' really is." Mathews' takes on "modern angst and despair" continues to hold true in our current time.

Brian Phillips, writer for The Ringer, credits Sundown as being a major influence on the later Native American Renaissance.
