= Tallgrass Prairie Preserve =

Largest tract of remaining tallgrass prairie in the world

Joseph H. Williams Tallgrass Prairie Preserve
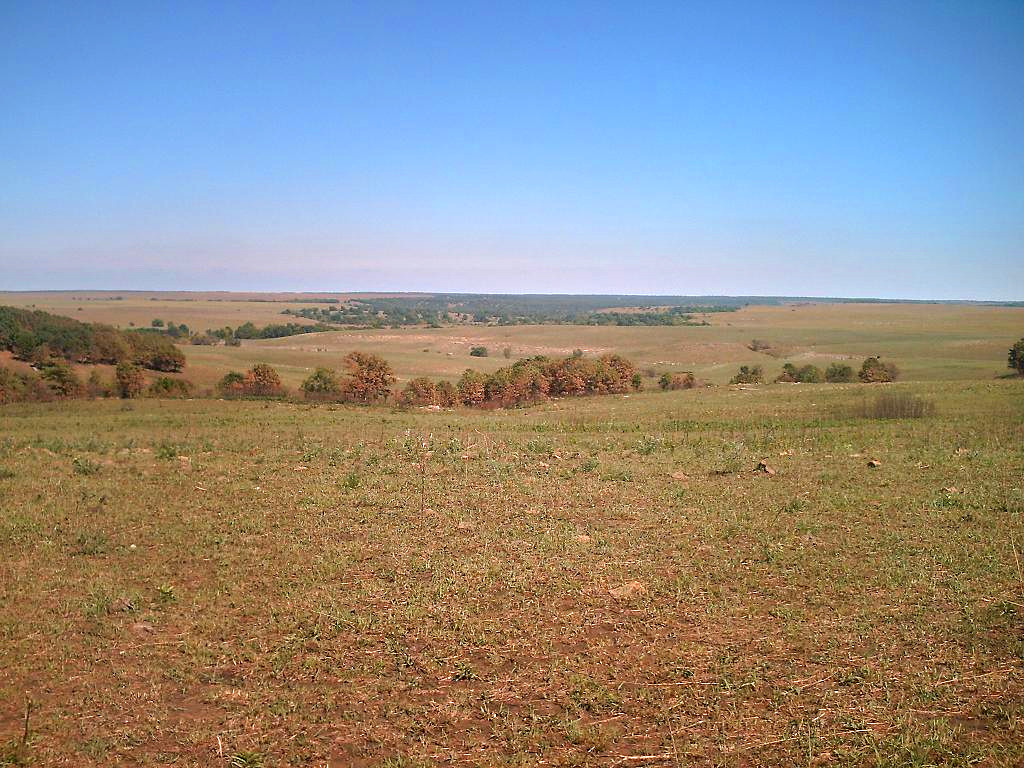
- Tallgrass Prairie Preserve

- Location within Oklahoma Location within the United States
- Location: Osage County, Oklahoma
- Nearest city: Pawhuska
- Coordinates: 36°50′31″N 96°25′08″W
- Area: 45,000 acres (180 km^{2})
- Established: 1989
- Visitors: 27,531 (in 2025)
- Governing body: The Nature Conservancy

The Joseph H. Williams Tallgrass Prairie Preserve, in Osage County, Oklahoma near Pawhuska, Oklahoma, is the largest protected tract of tallgrass prairie in the world. Managed by The Nature Conservancy, the preserve contains 39,650 acres (160 km^{2}) owned by the Conservancy and another 6,000 acres (24 km^{2}) leased in what was the original tallgrass region of the Great Plains that stretched from Texas to Manitoba.

== Description ==
The preserve is located at the south end of the Flint Hills, also known as the Osage Hills. The rocky, rolling prairie stretches from northern Kansas into Oklahoma. Exposed limestone formations make cultivation difficult, and thus the Flint Hills have survived much as they were when they were a hunting ground for area tribes such as the Wichita, Osage, and Kaw. The region is called “The Osage” by Oklahomans, referring to the name of the Native American nation occupying this territory and to the county named for them. Pilots call The Osage the “Black Hole” when flying over it at night because it is so lightly populated.

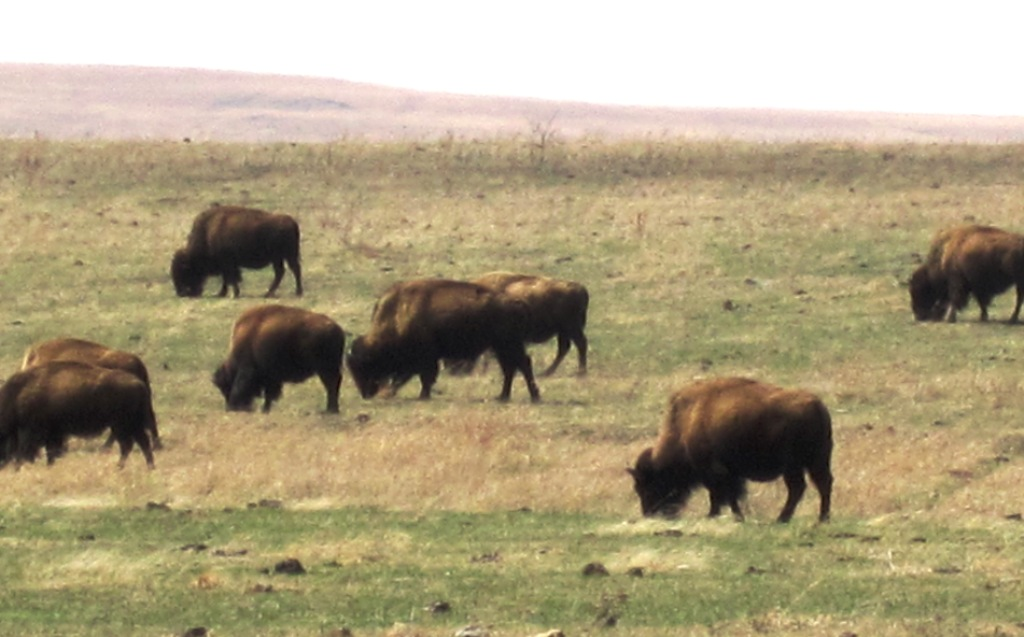
In March bison graze the new green grass in areas of the preserve that were burned the previous fall.

The preserve is bisected by the well-timbered Salt Creek and its tributaries. The eastern portion of the preserve is in the Cross Timbers, a north-south running belt of tangled oak forests that were a major impediment to early travelers heading west. About 10 percent of the preserve is forested and the remainder is tallgrass prairie; the grasses of several species here can grow 10 feet (3 m) tall.

The tallgrass prairie owes its existence to fire, whether caused by lightning or manmade. Without fire, the prairie quickly becomes brushland. The Native Americans were aware of this and burned the prairie regularly to nurture new growth of succulent grasses and to kill invasive trees and shrubs. The Nature Conservancy has continued this practice with a process called “patch burning,” in which about one-third of the prairie is burned each year. This process has proven beneficial not only in providing grazing for bison and cattle, but also for the habitat of the threatened greater prairie-chickens, which also inhabit the preserve in small numbers.

Bison are the most prominent attraction of the preserve. Bison are rounded up each fall and the excess numbers sold. Cattle are grazed on 11,000 acres (45 km^{2}). The preserve supports 755 plant species, many unique to the tallgrass prairie, and more than 300 bird species. Forest trees include several species of oak, cottonwoods, ash, red cedar, elm, sycamore, and others.

The Tallgrass Prairie Preserve is on what used to be the Osage Indian Reservation. When forced to agree to household allotments of communal land, the Osage retained sub-surface mineral rights on all their former lands. Members of the nation have had what are known as Osage headrights to a portion of this communal resource and are paid a portion of leasing revenues for mineral production. In the early 20th century, the discovery of petroleum on their land made the Osage the richest people per capita in the world in the 1920s and 1930s, but they were subject to harassment, manipulation, fraud and murder in what was known as a 'Reign of Terror' as whites tried to gain control of family members' headrights. While oil production has declined, there are still more than 100 producing oil wells on the preserve, among which the bison graze.

The preserve is home to numerous interesting invertebrates species. In addition to the many species of butterflies and moths that feed and host on the flowering plant biodiversity found there, the prairie mole cricket (Gryllotalpa major) is a rare insect species found on the preserve. Males congregate in leks in large numbers in the spring months (April–May) to produce loud choruses from calling burrows to attract flying females. In the summer months, the preserve serves as habitat for the endangered American burying beetle (Nicrophorus americanus), which plays an important role in nutrient cycling.

== History ==
Prior to its purchase by the Nature Conservancy in 1989, much of the preserve was within the boundaries of the Barnard Ranch; it had been part of the Chapman-Barnard ranch of 100,000 acres (400 km^{2}). The foreman of the Chapman-Barnard ranch, Ben Johnson Sr. was a rodeo champion. His son, also a rodeo champion, was Ben Johnson Jr., an actor who appeared in more than 300 movies and won an Oscar for his role in The Last Picture Show.

In 1993, Oklahoma oilman Kenneth Adams donated 300 bison to the preserve. By 2000, the herd had increased to 1,200. The herd now numbers more than 2,500 and grazes 21,000 acres (85 km^{2}) of mostly open range.

== Visiting and recreation ==
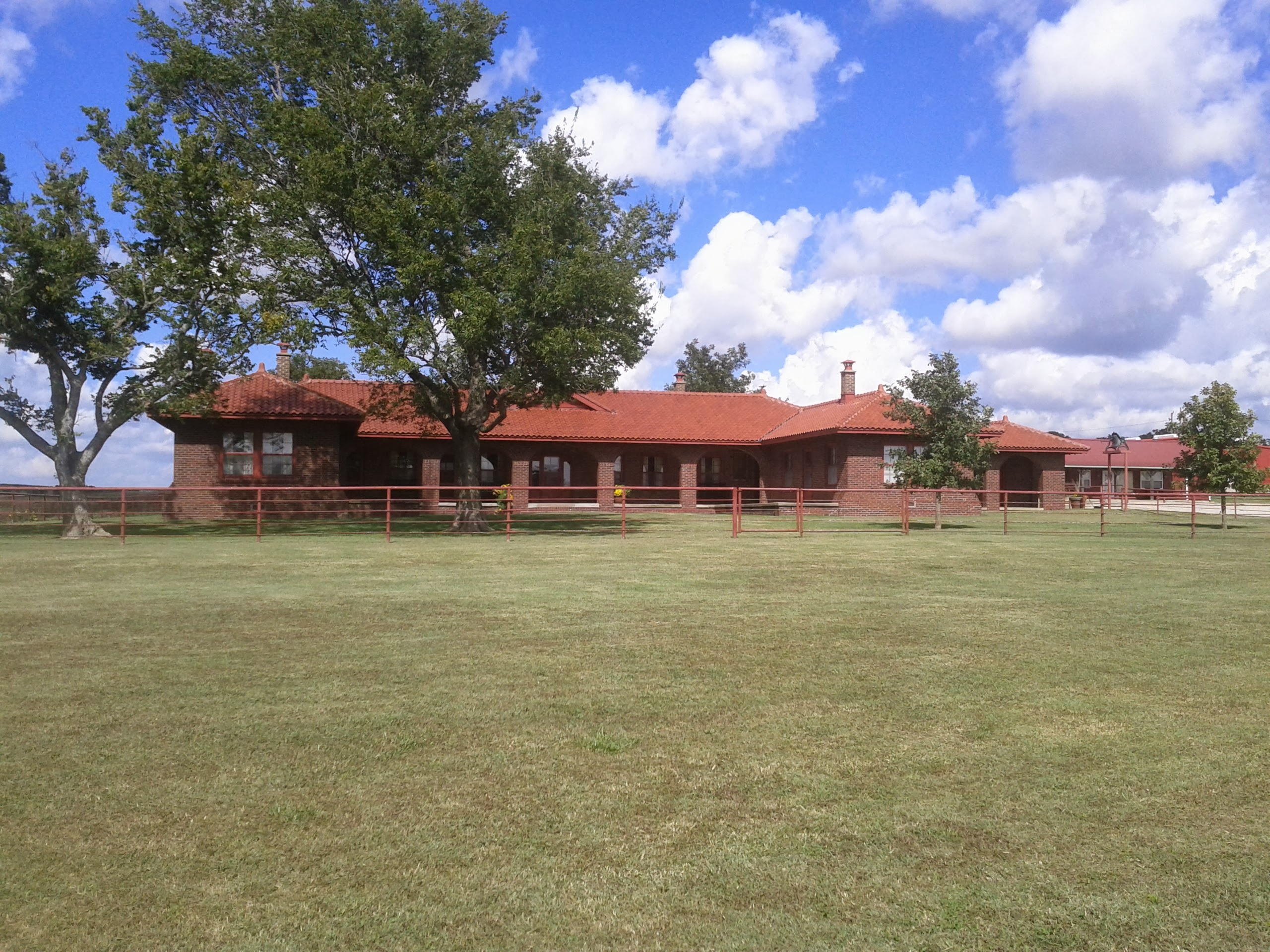
Ranch headquarters

Pawhuska, Oklahoma, is the nearest large town. The Osage Nation has its headquarters here. The preserve may also be entered near Foraker, Oklahoma, and Hewins, Kansas. The Tallgrass Prairie Preserve is open every day from dawn to dusk. There is no admission charge.

The headquarters of the Chapman-Barnard ranch has been converted into a visitor center with restrooms and the restored bunkhouse in which the cowboys lived. The main building is listed in the National Register of Historic Places (NR 01000208). Oklahoma State University has a research station near the visitor center.

Near Salt Creek are two hiking trails. One is a short nature trail; the other is a 2-mile (3 km) trail that climbs to overlooks over the creek and through the riparian forest. Frequently, bison are seen just across the fence that separates the hiking area from grazing areas. White-tailed deer are abundant in the wooded areas.

The principal activity for the 10,000 visitors who annually come to the preserve is driving the many dirt roads to observe the numerous bison. Often hundreds of bison may be seen near – and sometimes blocking – the roads. Scenic turnouts along the roads provide broad vistas of the rolling prairie, emerald green in spring, tall and brown in fall, and dotted with wildflowers in the summer.

Noted Osage author John Joseph Mathews had a small cabin in the Osage Hills, The Blackjacks, where he did much of his writing. At his request, he was buried near his cabin. About 2014 the Nature Conservancy of Oklahoma bought the plot including his cabin and gravesite, and have added it to the Tallgrass Prairie Preserve. The cabin will be preserved and the public will be allowed limited access.

== See also ==
- Conservation of American bison
- List of protected grasslands of North America
