= The Blackjacks (house) =

General information
- Architectural style: Cabin
- Coordinates: 36°44′09″N 96°22′52″W
- Year(s) built: 1932
- Owner: John Joseph Mathews

Technical details
- Material: sandstone
- Floor count: 1

Design and construction
- Architect(s): John Joseph Mathews

The Blackjacks is the historic home of John Joseph Mathews built in 1932, now part of Tallgrass Prairie Preserve.

== History ==
During the summer of 1932, John Joseph Mathews designed a two-room home to be built out of native sandstone. The center of the design was a fireplace. On July 24, 1932, Mathews moved into the home. Stanley Vestal and his wife stayed as his guests on the first night. He initially called it "the Shack" before changing the name to "The Blackjacks" in 1936. The house is in the Osage Hills in Osage County. He spent most of his writing career from here among the blackjack trees. The home was largely abandoned after Mathews death in 1979 and he was buried on the property. In 2014, The Nature Conservancy purchased the property from the family.

== Location and tourism ==
The Blackjacks is located on the Tallgrass Prairie Preserve. Tours of the home are held seasonally.

== Works cited ==
- Snyder, Michael (2017). John Joseph Mathews: Life of an Osage Writer. Norman: University of Oklahoma Press. ISBN 978-0-8061-5609-5.
