= John Clinton Hunt =

American writer (1925–2017)

- Born: July 24, 1925; Muskogee, Oklahoma, U.S.
- Died: December 30, 2017 (aged 92)
- Education: University of Oklahoma
- Alma mater: Harvard University
- Occupation: writer
- Relatives: John Joseph Mathews (step-father)

John Clinton Hunt (July 24, 1925 – December 30, 2017) was an American writer from the state of Oklahoma.

== Early life and education ==
John Clinton Hunt was born on July 24, 1925, to Henry Hunt and Elizabeth Palmour in Muskogee, Oklahoma. The family moved to Pawhuska in 1928 and his younger sister, Ann, was born in 1930. On August 11, 1932, his father killed himself. His mother began a relationship with and later married John Joseph Mathews during his childhood.

In 1940, Hunt was sent to the Lawrenceville School. Like his step-father, he attended the University of Oklahoma and took a break from school to serve in a World War. In June 1943, he joined the Marine Corps Reserves and in 1946 he was discharged as a second lieutenant. He then finished his degree at Harvard University, where he was an editor of the Student Progressive. He graduated in 1948 and married Barbara Helen Mead in October of that year.

== Academic career ==
In 1950, Hunt joined the faculty at the University of Iowa and taught the classics. He later taught at the Thomas Jefferson School.

== CIA career ==
In 1955, Hunt was recruited by Cord Meyer as a CIA asset. He worked undercover in Europe for the Congress for Cultural Freedom for about a decade. Around 1960, he was the head of the Paris office, but he was forced to resign in 1967.

== Writing career ==
Hunt's first novel was Generations of Men and was inspired by his upbringing in Pawhuska. The character Hardin Buck was inspired by John Joseph Mathews. It won the Spur Award for Best Novel of the West in 1956 and was a finalist for the National Book Award in 1957. His second novel was The Grey Horse Legacy (1968). Page Stegner, reviewing for The New York Times, described it as "in both style and conception, a fine work." In 1981, he co-wrote Knights Errant with Martin Kaplan.

== Personal life and death ==
In 1968 he divorced Barbara and married a Frenchwoman, Chantal Pépin de Bonnerive.

In 1985 was the founding chair and president of BioTechnica International until his retirement in 1990.

John Clinton Hunt died on December 30, 2017, at the age of 92.

== Works cited ==
- Snyder, Michael (2017). John Joseph Mathews: Life of an Osage Writer. Norman: University of Oklahoma Press. ISBN 978-0-8061-5609-5.
