= John Allen Mathews =

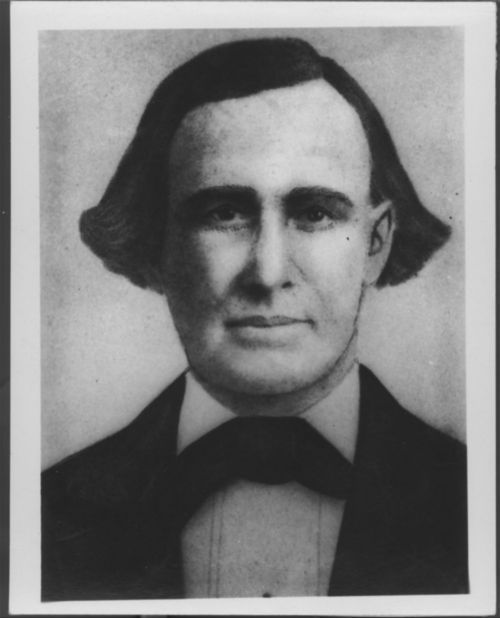
- Mathews circa. 1851–1861
- Born: 1809; Kentucky
- Died: September 19, 1861 (aged 51–52); Kansas
- Spouse(s): Mary Ann Williams (died 1843) Sarah Williams (m. 1843; died 1856)
- Children: 6, including William Shirley Mathews
- Relatives: William S. Williams (father-in-law); John Joseph Mathews (grandson)
- Military career
- Allegiance: CSA
- Branch: Confederate Army
- Service years: 1860–1861
- Rank: Captain

John Allen Mathews (1809 – September 19, 1861) was an American frontiersman and slave owner who settled among the Osage Nation and later advocated and died for the Confederate States of America.

== Early life and family ==
John Allen Mathews was a native of Kentucky with Virginia roots. Mathews worked as a blacksmith sent by the United States to work among Indian tribes to fulfil treaty obligations. He worked for the Seneca tribe in 1839 before being sent to work in the Osage Nation in 1840. He was one of the first white people to settle in Labette County, Kansas and is one of the founders of Oswego, Kansas. He arrived with a seven-year-old son and a slave and the Osage were generally disappointed that the three men represented the fulfillment of their treaty promise of a functioning blacksmith for the nation. He claimed a 140-acre (57 ha) plot and imported slaves to build a large house, trading post, water well, blacksmith, stables, and horse racing track. He married Mary Ann Williams, the daughter of William S. Williams and his Osage wife A-Ci'n-Ga, in the mid-1830s. The couple had two children, Sue and Aloysius Allen, before Mary's death in 1843. After her death, he married her sister Sarah Williams and they had four children (John, Janes, William Shirley Mathews, and Edward Martin) before her death in 1856. He gained a reputation as a fair trader among the Osage (rare for white traders in the era) and was a strong advocate for slavery in the United States.

== American Civil War and death ==
Mathews was a prominent figure in Southeast Kansas in the lead up to and during the American Civil War. He was a pro-Confederate partisan and raider from 1856 on during Bleeding Kansas. In 1861, he was commissioned a Confederate Army captain and led a meeting on June 4, 1861, to organize Cherokee, Osage, and white people living in the area (then known as "the Neutral lands") to join the Confederacy. He organized and recruited heavily for Confederate partisans operating in Kansas. His recruiting included his son John Mathews Jr. He eventual led a raid on Father Schoenmakers and the Jesuit-run Osage Mission's post. Schoenmakers had educated Mathews children and was warned of the raid by William Shirley Mathews, saving the priests in the mission. He was killed by Pleasant Smith in a battle against forces led by James G. Blunt on September 19, 1861.

== Works cited ==
- Blackmar, Frank Wilson (1912). Kansas; a cyclopedia of state history, embracing events, institutions, industries, counties, cities, towns, prominent persons, etc. ... with a supplementary volume devoted to selected personal history and reminiscence. Chicago: Standard publishing company.
- Cheatham, Gary L. (Autumn 2007). ""If the Union Wins, We Won't Have Anything Left": The Rise and Fall of the Southern Cherokees of Kansas" (PDF). Kansas History: 154–178.
- Snyder, Michael (2017). John Joseph Mathews: Life of an Osage Writer. Norman: University of Oklahoma Press. ISBN 978-0-8061-5609-5.
