= Carter Revard =

American poet, scholar, and writer (1931–2022)

- Born: March 25, 1931; Pawhuska, Oklahoma, U.S.
- Died: January 3, 2022 (aged 90); University City, Missouri, U.S.
- Education: University of Tulsa; Merton College, Oxford; Yale University
- Occupations: Poet; linguist; medievalist
- Writing career
- Notable work: How the Songs Come Down
- Literary movement: Native American Literature, Free verse
- Website: www.hanksville.org/storytellers/revard/

Carter Curtis Revard (March 25, 1931 – January 3, 2022) was an American poet, scholar, and writer. He was of European American and Osage descent, and grew up on the tribal reservation in Oklahoma. He had his early education in a one-room schoolhouse, before winning a Quiz Bowl scholarship for college, subsequently attending University of Tulsa for his BA.

His Osage name, Nompehwahthe, was given to him in 1952 by Josephine Jump, his Osage grandmother. (Note: Josephine Jump was not Revard's biological grandmother, but his step-grandmother. Revard refers to her as his grandmother in his biographies and literature.) The same year, he won a Rhodes Scholarship for graduate work at Oxford University. After completing a PhD at Yale University, Revard had most of his academic career at Washington University in St. Louis, where he specialized in medieval British literature and linguistics.

After 1980, Revard became notable as a Native American poet and writer and published several books, as well as numerous articles, about the literature. However, Revard was never enrolled as a citizen in a federally recognized tribe.

== Early life and education ==
Revard was born in Pawhuska, Oklahoma, a town within the Osage Nation on March 25, 1931. His mother was Thelma Louise Camp, a white woman, and his biological father was McGuire Revard, who was Osage. He was raised by his mother and his fullblood Osage stepfather Addison Jump. Carter Revard was of Irish, Scots-Irish, and Osage descent. He grew up on Buck Creek Valley about 20 miles east of Pawhuska, where he and his twin sister were among seven siblings. The children were taught up to the eighth grade in a one-room schoolhouse. He learned some Osage and Ponca, which are related languages. Revard and his classmates combined schoolwork with farming tasks and odd jobs; Revard also helped train greyhounds for racing. He went to Bartlesville High School. Revard was not enrolled in any Native nation.

Winning a radio quiz scholarship, Revard attended the University of Tulsa, where he earned a BA in 1952. He was mentored by Professor Franklin Eikenberry, who supported him in applying for a Rhodes Scholarship for study at Oxford University, where Revard matriculated at Merton College in 1952, taking a second class English BA degree in 1954. After returning to the United States, he was encouraged by Eikenberry to do further graduate work. Revard earned a PhD in English at Yale University in 1959.

== Academic career ==
Revard first taught at Amherst College. Beginning in 1961, he started teaching at Washington University in St. Louis, where he had his academic career. The traditional territory of the Osage was in the Missouri region before they were removed to a reservation.

Revard's major scholarly focus throughout his career was on medieval scholarship and poetry and their social context. He was a respected voice in this field. He developed classes in language development for study by high school teachers. Revard also published scholarly work in the field of linguistics on the transition between Middle English and later forms of the language.

In 1967, Revard worked on a project in California funded by the military, which related to putting a large dictionary of the English language into computer accessible form, and developing programs to access it; he participated as a "semanticist linguist." It was related to computerizing Webster's Collegiate Dictionary. In August 1968 he gave a paper on this work in Las Vegas, Nevada to the Association for Computational Machinery. He also gave a paper on this work to the New York Academy of Science, which had a "section on lexicography and with the special section on computers", and later published these.

In 1971–1972, Revard went to England on a sabbatical, where he tried to do medieval research at Oxford during a period of student unrest and disruption that damaged important library resources. During this period, he also started writing and sending out poems, which appeared in journals and anthologies, including Voices from the Rainbow: Contemporary Poetry by American Indians released by Viking Press in 1975. His first poetry collection, Ponca War Dancers, was published in 1980 by Point Riders Press out of Norman, Oklahoma. Many of the poems written about his Oxford period would be collected much later in An Eagle Nation (1993), particularly "Homework At Oxford," in which the speaker walks the grounds of the university and has a dream vision of his childhood in north central Oklahoma. Revard has also been a visiting professor at the universities of Tulsa and Oklahoma.

In addition, he published several critical articles about Native American literature, assessing it and placing it in the context of American literatures.

== Personal life and death ==
He was married to Stella Purce Revard, a distinguished scholar of Milton. They had four children: Stephen, Geoffrey, Vanessa, and Lawrence. Revard died at his residence in University City on January 3, 2022, at the age of 90.

== Awards and professional recognition ==
- 2007 - American Indian Festival of Words Author Award
- 2005 - Lifetime Achievement Award, Native Writers' Circle of the Americas
- 2002 - Finalist, Oklahoma Book Award, Nonfiction category, for Winning the Dust Bowl
- 2000 - Writer of the Year, Wordcraft Circle of Native Writers
- 1994 - Oklahoma Book Award, Poetry category, for Cowboys and Indians Christmas Shopping
- The Spring 2003 issue of the journal, Studies in American Indian Literatures (SAIL) was entirely devoted to discussions of Revard's work; it also included pieces by him.

Carter Revard was a member of the Modern Language Association (MLA), the Association for Studies in American Indian Literature, the River Styx Literary Organization, the Association of American Rhodes Scholars, the University of Tulsa Board of Visitors, the St. Louis Gourd Dancers and Phi Beta Kappa.

He served the American Indian Center of St. Louis as board member, secretary and president.

== Works ==
=== Books ===
- How the Songs Come Down, Salt Publications (2005), poetry
- Winning the Dust Bowl, University of Arizona Press (2001), autobiography
- Family Matters, Tribal Affairs, University of Arizona Press (1999), autobiography
- An Eagle Nation, University of Arizona Press (1997) poetry
- Cowboys and Indians Christmas Shopping, Point Riders Press (1992), poetry
- Ponca War Dancers, Point Riders Press (1980), poetry

== Works cited ==
- Glancy, Diane; Rodriguez, Lina (2023). Unpapered: Writers Consider Native American Identity and Cultural Belonging. Lincoln, Nebraska: University of Nebraska Press. p. 212. ISBN 978-1496235008.
- Levens, R.G.C., ed. (1964). Merton College Register 1900–1964. Oxford: Basil Blackwell.
- Snyder, Michael (2017). John Joseph Mathews: Life of an Osage Writer. Norman: University of Oklahoma Press. ISBN 978-0-8061-5609-5.

== See also ==
- John Joseph Mathews, a fellow Osage Oxonian
