= Fred Lookout =

Osage leader (1865–1949)

Principal chief of the Osage Nation
- In office June 30, 1924 – August 28, 1949
- Preceded by: Paul Red Eagle
- In office 1916–1918
- In office 1913–1914
- Preceded by: Bacon Rind

Assistant principal chief of the Osage Nation
- In office 1908–1910

Member of the Osage Nation tribal council
- In office 1920–1922

Personal details
- Born: ca. 1861 or November 1865; Osage Mission's post
- Died: August 28, 1949 (age 87-88)
- Citizenship: Osage Nation

Fred Lookout (ca. 1861 – 1949) was an Osage Nation politician who served several terms as the principal chief of the nation. Lookout served as principal chief three times: 1913–1914, 1916–1918, and from 1924 until his death in 1949.

Born near Independence, Kansas in Osage territory, he attended the Carlisle Indian Industrial School and was removed with his tribe to present-day Osage County, Oklahoma. He became active in tribal politics in the 1900s, serving as the assistant chief of the Osage Nation between 1908 and 1910 and on the Osage Nation tribal council between 1920 and 1922. He died in office while serving as the principal chief of the nation in 1949.

== Early life ==
Fred Lookout was born into an Osage family in 1861 or November 1865 (Note: The sources differ on Lookouts exact birth year with the Oklahoma Hall of Fame giving the birth year of 1861, while the Encyclopedia of North American Indians gives November 1865.) near present-day Independence, Kansas. His father, Eagle-that-Dreams, was a member of the Eagle Clan. He later said of his life in Kansas:

"I was born in a typical Osage camp of the Little Osages. Our lodges were on the prairie. They were made of bent poles for frame work, with elm bark around the base, with cattail stems forming the sides and buffalo hides spread over the top for a roof. These lodges were 20 or more feet wide and 25 to 30 feet long."

The United States Indian Agent to the Osage Nation selected Lookout at about age 18 in 1879 to attend the newly founded Carlisle Indian Industrial School in Pennsylvania. He attended Carlisle until 1884; that year his father died and he returned home to his people. He refused to return to the school.

Lookout married Julia Pryor (Osage), a member of the Bear clan, and they settled on a farm near Pawhuska, Oklahoma.

== Political career ==
Lookout entered tribal politics in 1908, winning election as assistant principal chief. He did not run for reelection in 1910. In 1914, he was appointed principal chief by U.S. Secretary of the Interior Walter L. Fisher, replacing Bacon Rind. The latter was removed in relation to a scandal involving oil leases. The Osage had retained mineral rights on their land and were becoming wealthy from revenue from oil leases. There was much corruption in the local areas by whites trying to gain access to Osage wealth. Lookout lost his reelection effort later that year. In 1916, he won a two-year term as principal chief. Thereafter, he served on the tribal council from 1920 to 1922. In 1926 he was elected again as principal chief and was repeatedly elected, serving until his death in office in 1949. During the Osage Indian murders, Lookout's family claimed he survived a shooting attempt and then hired Chicago Mafia members as bodyguards.

== Legacy and death ==
He was inducted to the Oklahoma Hall of Fame in 1948, and said the honor showed the importance of the Osage to the culture and life of Oklahoma. Fred Lookout died on August 28, 1949. He holds the record for longest serving chief in the history of the tribe.
