= Cincinnati Hill =

Hill in Oklahoma, US

Cincinnati Hill is part of the Osage Hills in Tulsa, Oklahoma, USA (36.257217°N 95.992963°W). It is named for Cincinnati Ave (also known as North 4th West Avenue) that runs north and south through the hill.

Cincinnati Hill contains several Strava segments, most of which are categorized as a Category 4 climb.

== Streetcars ==
Up until 1913, streetcars were operated on Cincinnati Hill by the Tulsa Street Railway Company. The City of Tulsa decided that it was too dangerous a location to operate streetcars with the machinery the company was using at the time. The section on Cincinnati Avenue between Second and Third Streets has a slope of 6.33. In wet conditions the cars frequently slid down the hill. A sharp bend at Second Street made this particularly dangerous. A case was brought to the Corporation Commission of the State of Oklahoma by local citizens demanding that the City of Tulsa reinstate the service. This was denied.
