= Osage Plains =

Physiographic section extending through five U.S. states

Coordinates: 36°N 96°W

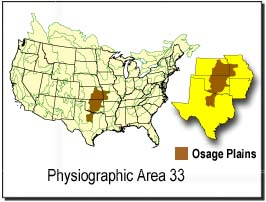
The Osage Plains extend through five U.S. states.

The Osage Plains are a physiographic section of the larger Central Lowland province, which in turn is part of the larger Interior Plains physiographic division. The area is sometimes called the Lower Plains, North Central Plains, or Rolling Plains. The Osage Plains, covering west-central Missouri, the southeastern third of Kansas, most of central Oklahoma, and extending into north-central Texas, is the southernmost of three tallgrass prairie physiographic areas. It grades into savanna and woodland to the east and south, and into shorter, mixed-grass prairie to the west. The Osage Plains consist of three subregions. The Osage Plains proper occupy the northeast segment. Although sharply demarcated from the Ozark uplift, the plains are nonetheless a transitional area across which the boundary between prairie and woodland has shifted over time. In the central portion of the physiographic area lies the second subregion, the Flint Hills, commonly called "the Osage" in Oklahoma. This large remnant core of native tallgrass prairie is a rocky rolling terrain that runs from north to south across Kansas and extends into Oklahoma. To the west and south of these hills are the Blackland Prairies and Cross Timbers. This vegetatively complex region of intermixed prairie and scrubby juniper-mesquite woodland extends into north-central Texas. Bluestem prairies and oak-dominated savannas and woodlands characterize the natural vegetation in the Cross Timbers. Much of the area has been converted to agriculture, although expanses of oak forest and woodland are still scattered throughout the eastern portion of the subregion.

Birds in the Osage Plains include the threatened greater prairie-chicken, Henslow's sparrow, dickcissel, loggerhead shrike, field sparrow, scissor-tailed flycatcher, Bell's vireo, painted bunting, and Harris's sparrow. Wildfire suppression, overgrazing, and the spread of exotic plants are the factors most negatively affecting priority bird habitat. The area now is managed almost exclusively for beef production with annual burns and intensive grazing practices that provide little of the habitat structure required to support many priority bird species.

Historically, fire, drought, and plains bison were dominant ecological forces and had great influences on the vegetation from local to landscape scales. The Osage Plains and Flint Hills were dominated historically by tallgrass prairie with scattered groves of blackjack oak (Quercus marilandica) in the uplands and along drainages. A variety of wetland types, including wet prairie, marshes, and northern floodplain forests occurred along larger rivers. Today, much of the land in the Osage Plains is planted to corn and soybeans, or has been converted to non-native grasses for pasture and hay. Large expanses of tallgrass prairie remain in the Flint Hills, where relief is greater than in the Osage Plains subregion and the land less suitable for cropping.

== Geology ==
The Osage Plains are underlain by soft shales with interbedded sandstones and limestones of late Mississippian to Pennsylvanian ages. Some of the rocks prevalent in the Osage Plains are Mississippian limestone, limestone shale, Ordovician dolomite, and Pennsylvanian coal. Also, clay and shale are found within the Pennsylvanian bedrock.

The area contained two major mining areas. The biggest was the Tri-State lead and zinc region, consisting of nearly 2,000 sq mi (5,200 km^{2}). This was the largest concentration of zinc deposits anywhere in the world. Most mining sites have closed, mainly due to health and other environmental issues. More than $1 billion worth of lead and zinc were extracted from the area during the active mining days. The other major mining was for bituminous coal. Due to air quality standards, this region's coal is in low demand due to its high sulfur content.
