= Bacon Rind =

Osage politician

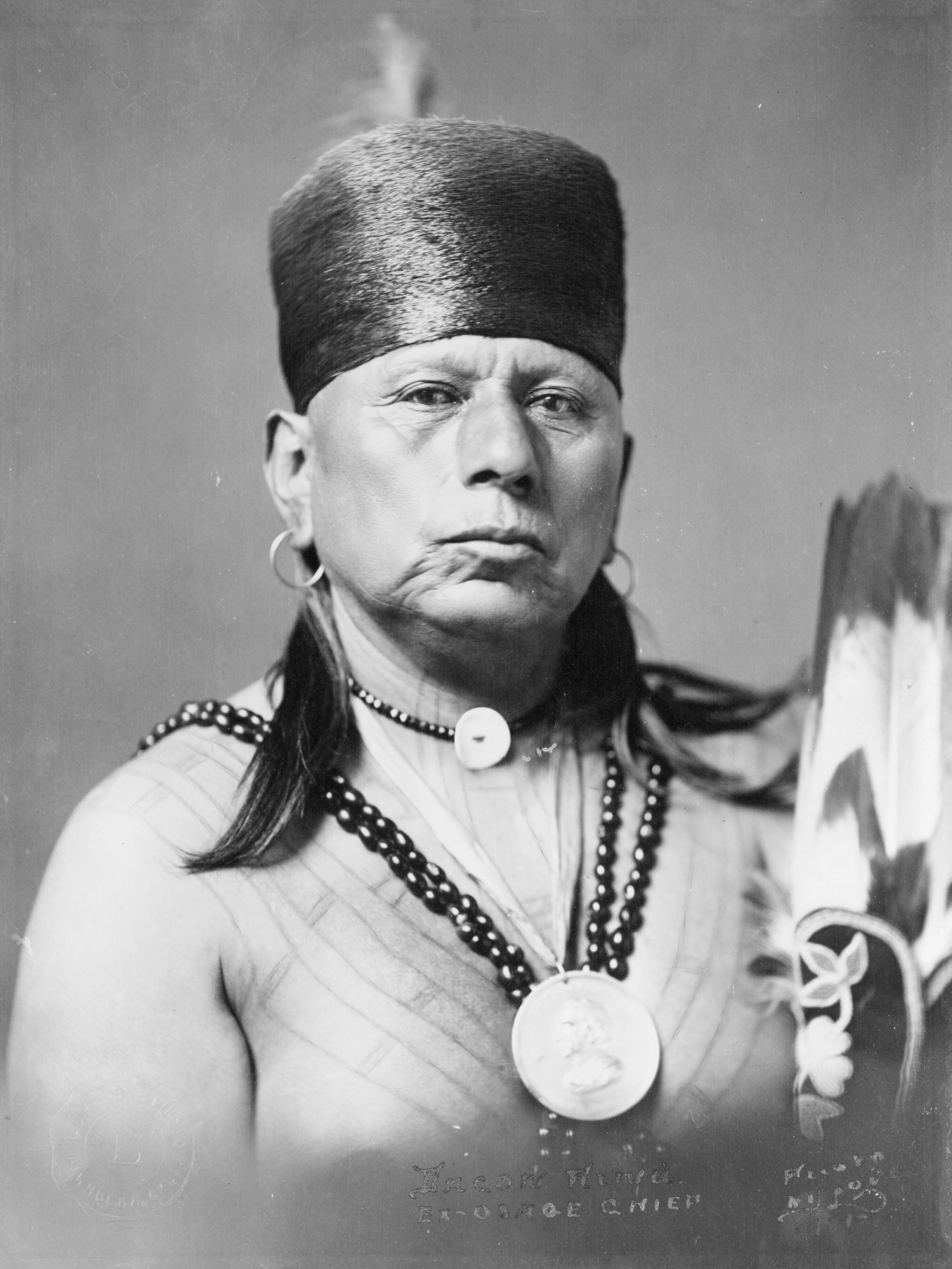
- Bacon Rind in 1913

Principal chief of the Osage Nation
- In office 1912–1913
- Succeeded by: Fred Lookout

Assistant chief of the Osage Nation
- In office 1904–1905

Personal details
- Born: ca. 1860 Kansas Territory, U.S.
- Died: March 28, 1932 (age 71–72) Pawhuska, Oklahoma, U.S.
- Citizenship: Osage Nation

Bacon Rind (Wah-she-hah; translation Star-That-Travels; ca. 1860 – March 28, 1932) was an Osage politician who served as Principal Chief of the Osage Nation between 1912 and 1913. He also served on the assistant chief between 1904 and 1905 and served on the tribal council.

== Early life ==
Bacon Rind was born in Kansas Territory around 1860 and was relocated with the Osage Nation to present-day Osage County, Oklahoma in the 1870s.

== Political career ==
Rind was a member of the Progressive Party in the Osage Nation, favored allotment, and supported the development of oil on the reservation. However, he maintained traditionalist custom and dress and was a gifted orator in the Osage language. He served as a member of the Osage Nation Tribal Council and as the assistant principal chief from 1904-1905. In 1912 he was elected Principal Chief of the Osage Nation, but in 1913 he was removed from office by Secretary of Interior Walter L. Fisher for a bribery scandal in 1906 involving an oil lease. He was replaced by Fred Lookout. After his removal from office, he served on many occasions as a representative of the Osage Nation to Washington D.C. He died in Pawhuska, Oklahoma on March 28, 1932.
