= James Bigheart =

Osage chief

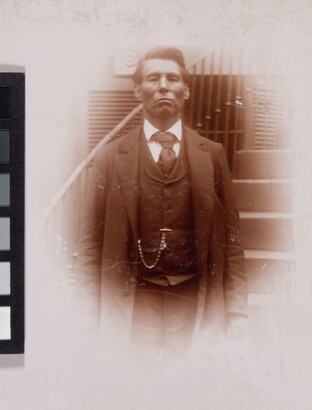
- James Bigheart in May 1894

Principal chief of the Osage Nation

Personal details
- Born: Pun-Kah-Wi-Tah-An-Kah c. 1838 Neosho County, Kansas
- Died: October 5, 1908 (age 69–70) Bigheart, Oklahoma
- Citizenship: Osage Nation
- Party: Non-Progressives
- Education: Osage Mission's post
- Known for: Negotiating the creation of the Osage Nation Mineral Estate

Military service
- Allegiance: United States
- Branch/service: Union Army
- Years of service: 1862–1865
- Rank: First lieutenant

James Bigheart (Osage romanized Pun-Kah-Wi-Tah-An-Kah; c. 1838 – October 5, 1908), also known as Big Jim, was an Osage politician who served as principal chief of the Osage Nation.

== Early life ==
James Bigheart was born Pun-Kah-Wi-Tah-An-Kah in 1838 to Nun-tsa-tum-kah and Wah-hui-shah near St. Paul, Kansas. Bigheart converted to Catholicism, was educated at the Osage Mission's post, and was fluent in multiple languages. (Note: He spoke Ponca, Muscogee, Sioux, Cherokee, Osage, French, English, and Latin.) He enlisted in the 9th Kansas Cavalry Regiment of the Union Army in Iola, Kansas on January 19, 1862. He left the army as a first lieutenant on March 22, 1865.

== Osage leadership ==
He signed his first treaty with the United States on May 27, 1868. In 1870, the United States bought the Osage Nation reservation in Kansas, and the Osage in turn bought a reservation in Indian Territory from the Cherokee Nation. In 1871, he moved to Silver Lake (now Bartlesville) and then to Pawhuska in 1872. He built a home near Bird Creek, about 15 miles (24 km) southeast of Pawhuska. In 1875, he became principal chief of the Osage Nation. By 1881 Bigheart was the leader of the "Full Bloods", or Non-Progressives Party, of the Osage Nation. (Note: The Osage Nation at this point had a two-party system with the other being the "Mixed Bloods" or Progressives.) Bigheart is credited with leading his faction to delay the allotment of the Osage Nation reservation by about ten years. When the Osage Nation organized its first written constitution, Bigheart was the President of the National Council who drafted it and a signer of the document. When the first Osage elections were held in November 1882, Bigheart became the first elected Principal Chief of the Osage Nation. He suffered a stroke in March 1906 and was left partially paralyzed. He died in Bigheart, Oklahoma on October 5, 1908.

== Legacy ==
The town of Bigheart, Oklahoma, was named after James, until it was renamed to Barnsdall in 1921. In 1989, the Chief James Bigheart Memorial Bridge was dedicated on Oklahoma State Highway 11. In 2016, the Osage Nation dedicated a statue to Bigheart at Law Building on the Osage campus in Pawhuska.
