= Million Dollar Elm =

The Million Dollar Elm (unknown - 1980s; 2014 - 2024) was the name given to multiple trees in Pawhuska, Oklahoma, known for marking the site of auctions for oil leases to drill in the Osage Nation. The original tree died in the 1980s due to Dutch elm disease and a replacement tree planted in 2014 was felled in April 2024.

== History ==
=== First tree ===
The Million Dollar Elm was an elm tree in Pawhuska, Oklahoma. The tree was the site of auctions for oil leases for Osage County, since mineral rights for the county are owned by the Osage Nation. The first auction was held in November 1912 with Colonel Ellsworth Walters serving as the official auctioneer. The tree earned its nickname on November 11, 1912, when over $1 million in oil leases were sold under the tree.

The auctions were attended by oil barons, such as Frank Phillips and E. W. Marland, as well as influential members of the Osage Nation, such as John Joseph Mathews.

The tree died in the 1980s due to Dutch elm disease.

=== Second tree ===
A new Million Dollar Elm was replanted by Osage Nation Secretary Casey Johnson in 2014. On April 30, 2024, the tree was chopped down by an unknown party. The Osage Nation Police Department opened an investigation into the felling May 1. Cody J. Willard, a master arborist, later determined the tree had been sawed 40% through several months earlier likely with a yellow Dewalt Sawzall.
