= Transportation in Tulsa, Oklahoma =

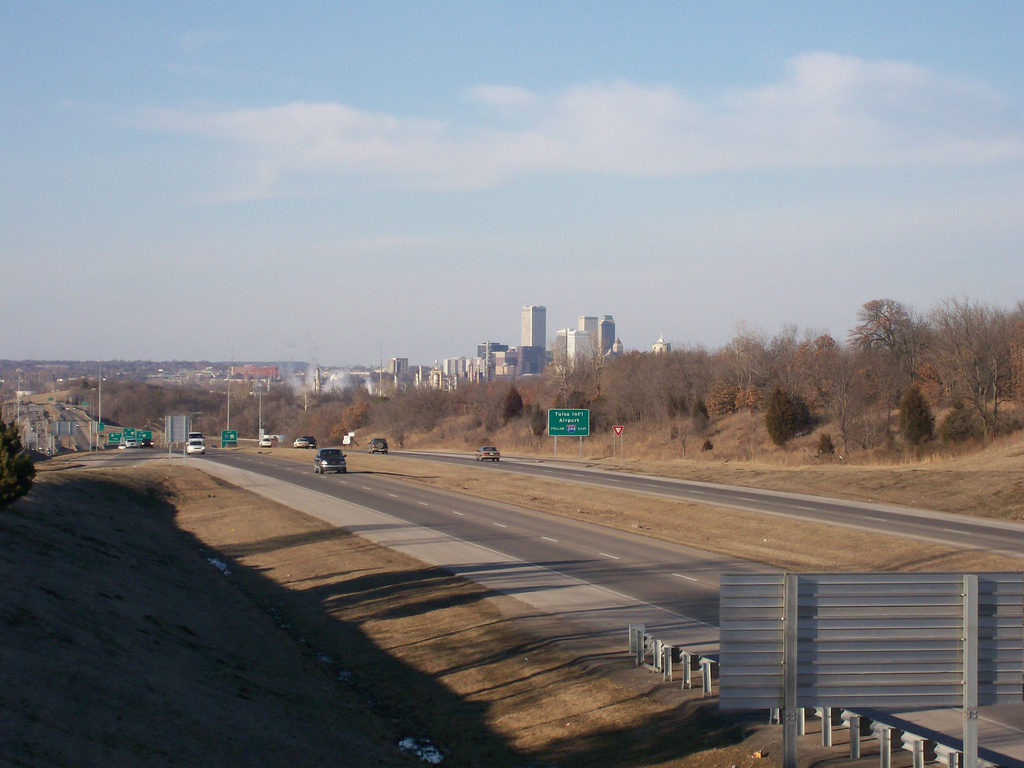
Part of Tulsa's highway network, US-75 connects Downtown's inner-dispersal loop to Interstate 44 and Interstate 244.

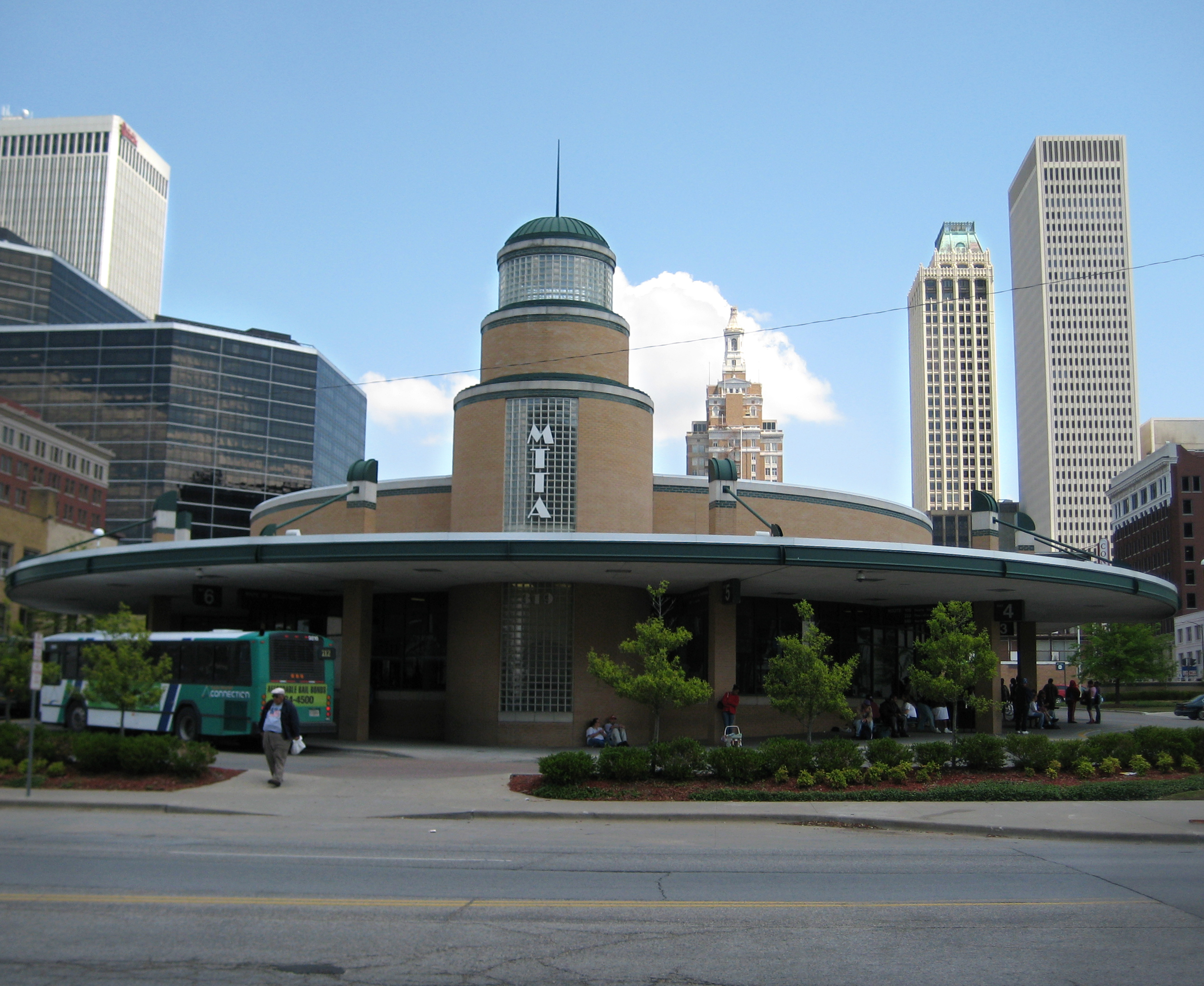
MetroLink's Denver Avenue Station

Transportation in Tulsa, Oklahoma includes a bus network and a system of raised highways and primary thoroughfares, laid out in mile-by-mile increments. In addition, throughout its entire length in Tulsa, historic Route 66 is a drivable road, with motels and restaurants reminiscent of the route's heyday era.

MetroLink, the city's transit bus operator, runs buses on 18 different routes across Tulsa and in surrounding suburbs such as Broken Arrow, Sand Springs and Jenks. Tulsa Transit has two stations: the Memorial Midtown Station at 7952 E. 33rd St. in Midtown Tulsa, and the Denver Avenue Station at 319 S. Denver, across from the BOK Center in Downtown. Most routes go through one or both of the stations, facilitating the commute to work and events in Downtown or Midtown. Buses stop at specific stops such as Tulsa Community College, Oklahoma State University-Tulsa, CityPlex Towers, Cox Communications, the various medical facilities in Tulsa, and many shopping destinations, hotels, and schools. The bus schedules are periodically changed; votes are taken by Tulsa Transit to help decide what are the best specifics for certain routes. Tulsa opened its first bus rapid transit (BRT) line along Peoria Avenue from 54th Street North to 81st Street South in 2019. It features more frequent buses, upgraded stations, and faster travel times.

== History ==
Tulsa streets were simply dirt tracks until after the turn of the 20th century. The first contract for paving was awarded in 1906. Bricklaying did not begin until October of that year and proceeded slowly because local demand for bricks far exceeded the capacity of nearby brick plants. Later, streets were paved with concrete or asphalt.

=== Streetcars ===
The Tulsa Street Railway (TSR) was formed in 1905 by a group of 18 private investors, led by real estate developer Grant Stebbins. By the end of 1906, TSR had electric streetcars operating downtown along Main, Third and Fifth Streets. One reference states that the street car lines were completed even before the streets were paved. In 1913 TSR was forced to withdraw its service on Cincinnati Hill by the City of Tulsa due to the danger of cars sliding down the hill. In 1909, the Oklahoma Union Traction Company (OUT) built another streetcar line that ran from Owen Park to 18th Street and Lewis, an area now known as Swan Lake. The route went through Downtown on Fourth Street, south on Elgin to 11th Street, and then turned south on Lewis. TSR then built a line from First and Peoria to Kendall College. By 1923, TSR owned 21 miles (34 km) of track and 52 trolley cars. Several more lines were built until the 1920s, when private cars and taxis became more abundant and ridership began to decline. TSR was sold in 1926 to United Service Company. The streetcar system was sold again in 1936 to National City Lines.

OUT went bankrupt in 1935. The trolley wires and rails were removed, and public transportation turned exclusively to buses.

=== Interurbans ===
In 1911, the Sand Springs Railway Company built an interurban line connecting Tulsa and Sand Springs. The Tulsa Sapulpa Union Line (originally the Sapulpa and Interurban Railway) connected the two towns with the oilfields. All of the lines are defunct. The Sand Springs line was the last interurban operating in Oklahoma when it ceased operating, on January 2, 1955. The Tulsa Sapulpa line went bankrupt in 1917 and again in 1934, when it acquired its present name. It still operates as a freight-hauling Class III short-line railroad with 23 miles of track connecting BNSF in Sapulpa with Union Pacific in Tulsa.

=== Bus service ===
While the TSR had operated with some buses along with its streetcars, by the time that business was sold on February 5, 1936 to a subsidiary of National City Lines called the Tulsa City Lines, streetcars were dropped and transportation became by bus only. Bus traffic peaked in 1946, immediately after the war, with a ridership of 29 million passengers. Tulsa City Lines continued offering bus transportation until 1957, at which time the company did not request renewal of its franchise due to ridership declining to 11 million passengers. The city then choose MK&O Lines to provide local transportation, with that company utilizing 75 modern 45-passenger busses. But by the end of its 25-year franchise, MK&O said it could not continue without help, noting that ridership had fallen to 3.7 million in 1967. On August 2, 1968, the Metropolitan Tulsa Transit Authority, typically called MetroLink Tulsa in the present day, was created to make local bus transportation a city government responsibility. MetroLink serves not only Tulsa but also parts of Broken Arrow, Sand Springs and Jenks. It offers scheduled routes as well as curb-to-curb service for the elderly and disabled communities. As of 2018, MetroLink was providing about 3 million rides per year.

=== Tourist Shuttle ===
Starting Nov 2, 2012 the city of Tulsa introduced a newly-revived Tulsa Trolley system (trolley-style busses) that would run every Friday & Saturday from 5pm through 2am to three of some of the City's most popular entertainment areas: the Blue Dome, Brady Arts, and Deco Districts, free of charge.

=== Railroads ===
Into the late 1950s several trains of the Frisco, Katy or MKT and Santa Fe railways went in diverse directions from Tulsa's Tulsa Union Depot. Destinations included Chicago, Illinois; Kansas City, Missouri; St. Louis, Missouri; Oklahoma City, Oklahoma; Dallas, Houston, San Antonio and Galveston, Texas. For a brief period in recent years the Iowa Pacific company planned and operated test commercial runs of the Eastern Flyer, a passenger train between Tulsa and Oklahoma City.

== Highways ==
Interstate 44 and the Skelly Drive Bypass crosses Tulsa through midtown from east and west. Its sister highways, Interstate 244 and Interstate 444, make up the inner-dispersal loop surrounding downtown and wrap through the northern part of the city, reconnecting to Interstate 44 in the east and southwest parts of the city. U.S. Highway 412 leaves the city from its most eastern and western points, but through most of its duration in Tulsa, it is primarily concurrent with Interstate 244. U.S. Highway 64 forms the Broken Arrow Expressway to the east and goes as far as the Sand Springs Expressway to the west. U.S. Highway 75 traverses West Tulsa through downtown going north and south, and U.S. Highway 169, also called the Mingo Valley Expressway or the Pearl Harbor Memorial Expressway, generally crosses the city in its eastern areas in a north–south direction. State Highway 11 serves the Tulsa International Airport, connecting from I-244 and Highway 75. The Creek Turnpike splits away from Highway 169 from the South and Interstate 44 from the East, bypassing most of the city of Tulsa and the suburb of Broken Arrow, eventually reconnecting with I-44 in Catoosa to the east and Jenks to the west.

== Street network ==
Tulsa follows a systematic naming and numbering convention for all streets that are within its municipal jurisdiction. Admiral Place is the east–west-running dividing line for "streets north" and "streets south," and Main Street is the north–south-running dividing line for "west avenues" and "east avenues." Avenues west of Main Street are named for US cities west of the Mississippi River for one run of the alphabet, and afterward, numbered "west avenues" are assigned. Avenues east of Main Street are named for US cities east of the Mississippi River for approximately three runs of the alphabet, and afterward, numbered "east avenues" are assigned. Streets north of Admiral Place have important names in Tulsa's history for one run of the alphabet, and afterward, numbered "streets north" are assigned. Streets south of Admiral Place are numbered, beginning with "1st Street" and continuing southward. Street names and numbers are consistent throughout the Tulsa jurisdiction, regardless of whether a particular street is contiguous or continuous.

Addresses reflect their associated hundred block from either Admiral or Main. There are usually 16 blocks per mile, as counted by avenues, and there are 10 blocks per mile, as counted by streets. Other right-of-way labels (such as Place, Court, Drive, Terrace, etc.) may be used to describe an intermittent street or avenue, but the actual name will usually be the same as the adjacent street or avenue (such as Knoxville Avenue and its neighboring Knoxville Place, which are both assigned as the 3600 block east).

Major arterial streets can be found at every mile, as assigned by the township-and-range system, resulting in a well-defined grid of thoroughfares across the Tulsa region. As an example, east–west thoroughfares south of Admiral Place are streets ending with a 1, giving 11th Street, 21st Street, 31st Street, etc.

== See also ==
- Plug-in electric vehicles in Oklahoma § Tulsa
