= Old Bill Williams =

American frontiersman (1787–1849)

"Old Bill" Williams
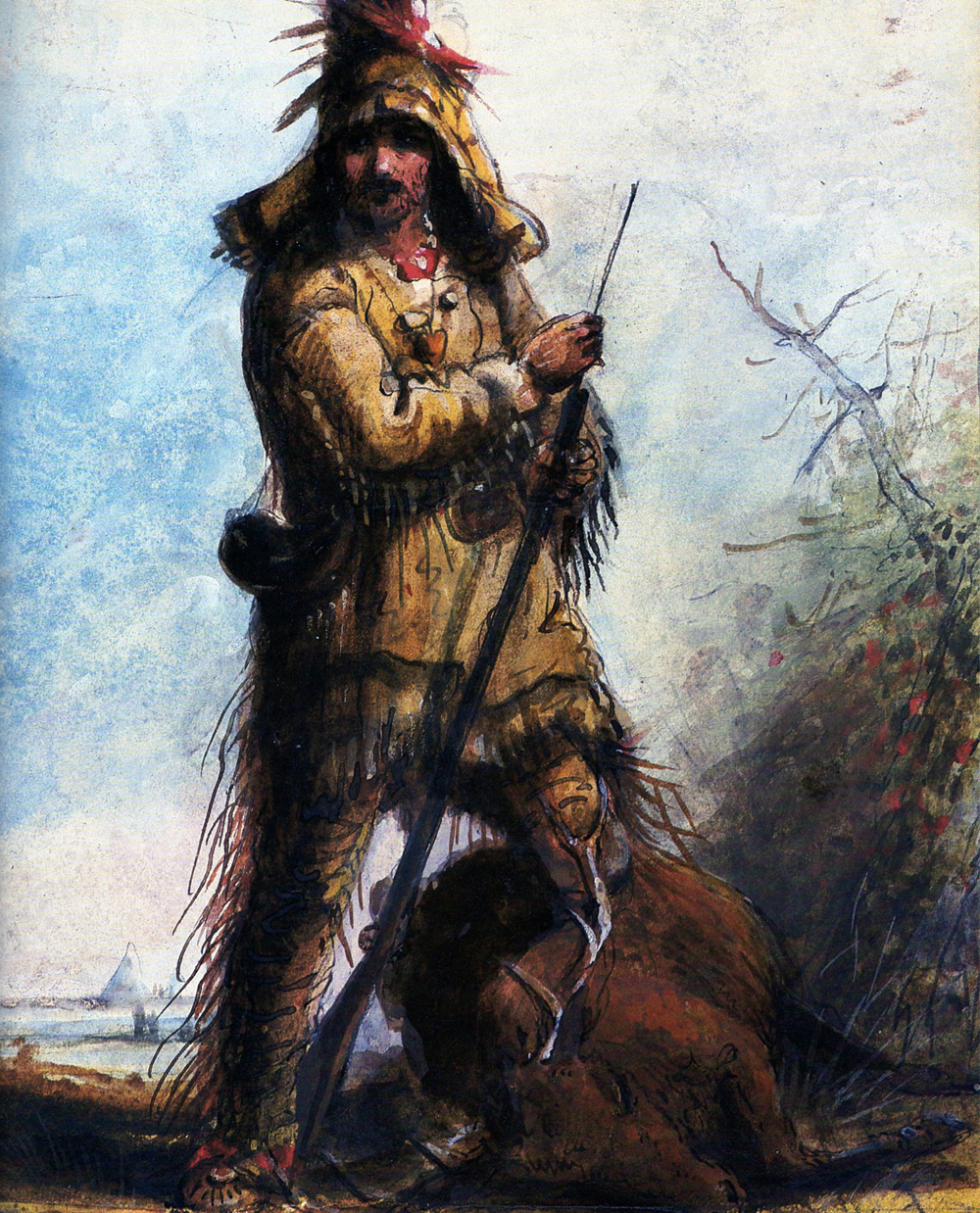
- Old Bill Williams by Alfred Jacob Miller
- Born: January 3, 1787; Polk County, North Carolina
- Died: March 14, 1849 (aged 62); La Garita Mountains
- Cause of death: Murdered by Ute warriors
- Citizenship: American
- Occupations: Mountain man, trapper, guide, interpreter
- Spouse: A-Ci'n-Ga (m. 1813; died 1825)
- Children: 2
- Parents: Joseph Williams (father); Sarah (Musick) Williams (mother)
- Relatives: John Allen Mathews (son-in-law) (Note: Mathews married both of Williams' daughters.)

William Sherley "Old Bill" Williams (January 3, 1787 – March 14, 1849) was a noted mountain man and frontiersman, known as Lone Elk to the Native Americans. Fluent in several languages, Williams served as an interpreter for the government and led several expeditions to the West. He married into the Osage Nation, having two children, each of whom married John Allen Mathews.

== Early life and education ==
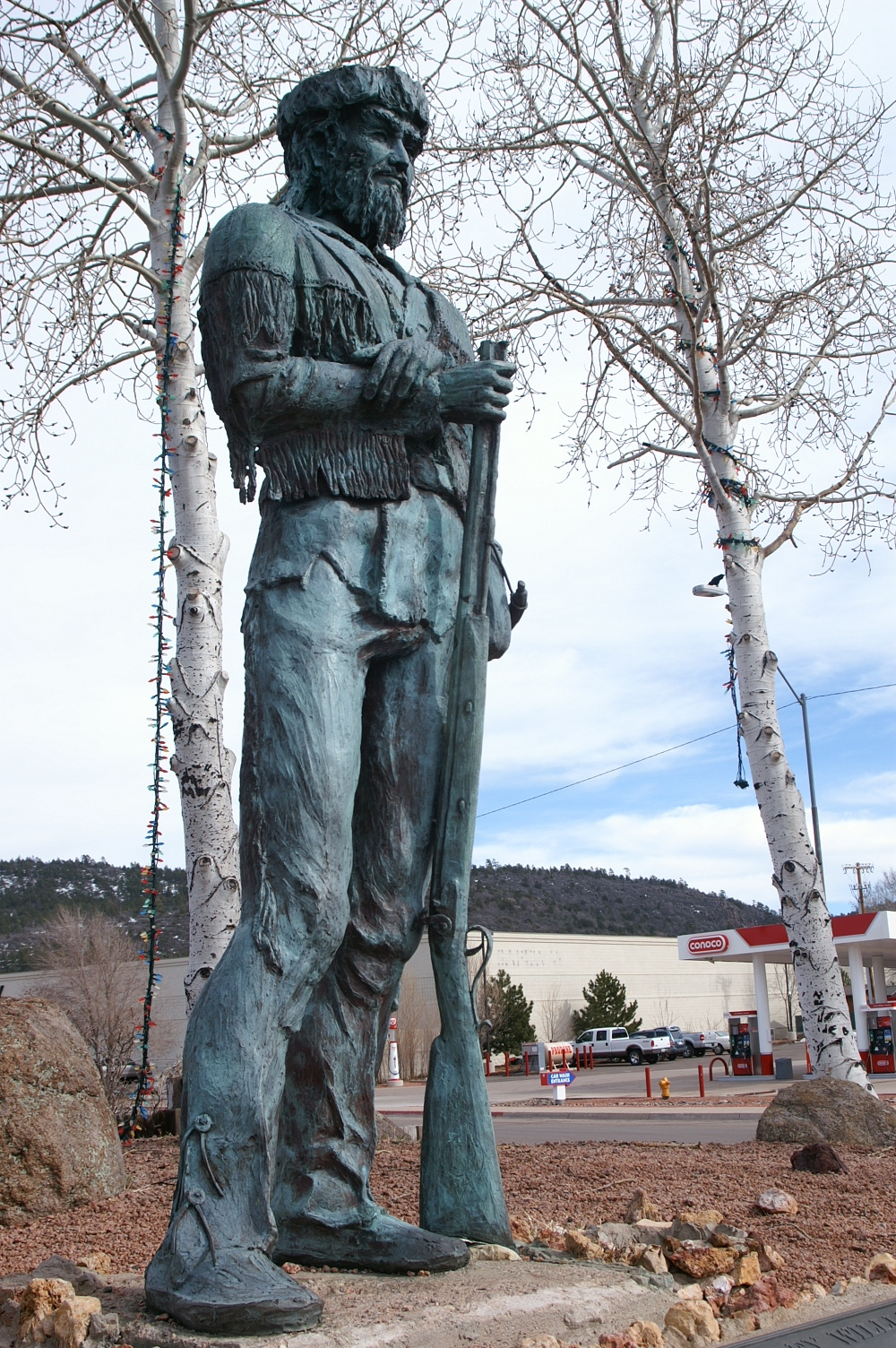
Old Bill Williams statue in Williams Arizona

Williams was born on January 3, 1787, on Horse Creek, a branch of the Pacolet River, under Skyuka Mountain in Polk County, North Carolina, into a Welsh family. He was the fourth of nine children born to Joseph Williams and Sarah Musick. Sarah's family was from Virginia. Joseph was from North Carolina and served seven years in the Continental Army, receiving a 274-acre land grant on Horse Creek in North Carolina as pay. In 1794 the family sold the land and moved west to St. Louis, then part of Spanish Louisiana. He learned reading, writing, and math from his parents, and received at least one year of formal schooling. As a child, he liked to explore and learned to trap animals for their furs, and found he had a gift for languages. At seventeen he left home to be a travelling Baptist preacher and after seven years switched to fur trapping.

== Career ==
Williams was a master fur trapper and trail guide, becoming fluent in several Native American languages among the tribes he knew the best. His ability to communicate in the different languages made him valuable to the government and tribes for negotiations.

=== Life among the Osage ===
During the 1810s and 1820s, he lived with the Osage Indians in Missouri. While residing with the Osage people he became fluent in their language, created an Osage language dictionary, and helped translate the Bible into Osage. He also worked for the United States as an Indian agent starting around 1813. In 1821, he assisted in negotiations between the Cherokee and Osage to end a war that had broken out. He was called "Red-Headed Shooter" by the Osage and left after the death of his wife in 1825.

==== Marriage and children ====
Williams married A-Ci'n-Ga, a full-blood Osage woman whose name translates to "Wind Blossom", (Note: Historian Michael Snyder notes this is similar to a traditional Osage name for a third daughter.) circa 1813. A-Ci'n-Ga was a member of the Big Hill band and the Buffalo clan. He courted her in the traditional Osage fashion, gifting her parents horses and asking their consent for the marriage. They had two children: Mary Ann Williams, born in 1814; and Sarah Williams, born in 1816. After A-Ci'n-Ga's death between 1819 and 1825, he sent his two daughters to boarding school in Kentucky where they met John Allen Mathews. Mary Ann married Mathews in the mid-1830s and after her death in 1843, Mathews married her sister Sara. Williams great-grandson through Sara is John Joseph Mathews.

=== Travels West ===
In 1824 he was issued a license to trade with the Kickapoo tribe. From 1825 to 1826 he served as part of a survey of the Santa Fe Trail. He was hired by the survey's Commissioners George C. Sibley, Benjamin Harrison Reeves, and Pierre Menard, alongside Joseph R. Walker and Joseph C. Brown, to be part of a survey of the trail. They followed a route from Fort Osage to Santa Fe. During the expedition he was an interpreter for a treaty with the Osage signed on August 10, 1825; he also witnessed a treaty with the Kaw people on August 16, 1825.

Biographer Alpheus Hoyt Favour notes that it is hard to distinguish myth from fact between the years of 1825 and 1841 in Williams life. He definitely traveled the Southwestern United States and may have married a Spanish woman and had a child, but Favour notes there is scant evidence. Similar stories exist about him marrying a Ute woman and being adopted by the tribe, but Favour is skeptical due to the lack of evidence; however, Williams was definitely fond of and close with some Ute people. In the fall of 1832, Albert Pike created a pen sketch of Williams while the two were traveling together.

In 1833-1834, he accompanied Joseph R. Walker on his expedition to California. Other members of the expedition included Benjamin Bonneville, Joseph Meek, Alexis Godey, Antoine Janis, William Craig, George Nidever, and Zenas Leonard. Historian Michael Snyder noted that during this expedition he showed "utter disregard" for the lives of Indians.

In the fall of 1840, he went trapping with Kit Carson and other trappers near the Green River. He spent 1841 and 1843 on expeditions to the Northwest and New Mexico.

Historian Michael Snyder, an Oklahoma State University professor and Osage Nation citizen, noted Williams's reputation declined as he aged. He wrote "Old Bill degenerated as he aged, becoming increasingly dirty, drunk, and dishonorable." In one instance he's claimed to have killed 25 innocent Indians and he frequently stole horses from Spanish missions during his expeditions.

=== Frémont's fourth expedition and death ===
In November 1848, John C. Fremont hired Williams to guide his ill-fated fourth expedition through the Southern Rocky Mountains. Fremont sought to find a railroad route through the Rockies along the 38th parallel north. Williams warned Fremont against following his intended route through the La Garita Mountains in winter, but Fremont proceeded with his 35 men and 150 mules. The expedition eventually became hopelessly mired in deep snow and 11 men and all but a few of the pack animals died. Williams led a rescue party south towards Taos, and the survivors of the expedition eventually managed to follow.

In March, Williams and Dr. Benjamin Kern returned to the La Garita Mountains retracing the expedition trail to look for expedition notes, gear and survivors. On March 14, 1849, Ute warriors killed Bill Williams and Dr. Kern in the mountains.

== Honors ==
"Old Bill" is portrayed in an 8-foot-tall bronze sculpture by B. R. Pettit, erected in 1980 in Bill Williams Monument Park in Williams, Arizona, a town named after him. Bill Williams Mountain and the Bill Williams River in Arizona, and Bill Williams Peak and the Williams Mountains in Colorado are named for him.

The Bill Williams Mountain Men of Williams, Arizona, founded in 1953, are named after him.

== Works cited ==
- Favour, Alpheus Hoyt (April 29, 1962). Old Bill Williams, Mountain Man. University of Oklahoma Press. ISBN 9780806116983 – via Google Books.
- Mathews, John Joseph (1961). The Osages:Children of the Middle Waters. Norman: University of Oklahoma Press.
- Snyder, Michael (2017). John Joseph Mathews: Life of an Osage Writer. Norman: University of Oklahoma Press. ISBN 978-0-8061-5609-5.
