= Sooner Magazine =

The Sooner Magazine (Note: Sooners is the name given to settlers who entered the Unassigned Lands in what is now the state of Oklahoma.) is a publication of the University of Oklahoma Foundation established in 1928. The entire run of the magazine was digitized and is available online

The Sooner Magazine was named the best alumni magazine in the U. S. and Canada for the 1954–1955 school year.

During 1972-1981 the magazine was in a hiatus, until it was revived by Carol Burr, a former staff member of the magazine and later a freelancer, who was invited to become the director of publications for the OU Foundation.
