= Osage headright =

Type of mineral property right in the U.S.

An Osage headright is a type of headright in the United States. There are 2,229 Osage headrights, one for each member of the Osage Nation enrolled in 1906, and they are inheritable. Osage headrights entitle the owner to a quarterly share of the Osage Mineral Estate.

Osage headrights are known for motivating some of the killers in the Osage Indian murders and for contemporary issues surrounding continued non-Osage ownership.

== Description ==
Osage headrights are property rights, protected under federal law, that entitle their owner to receive a quarterly payment from the Osage Mineral Estate. They also entitle their Osage owners to vote for members of the Osage Mineral Council. Historically, Osage headrights were linked to citizenship and voting in the Osage Nation. In 2006, a new Osage constitution eliminated headright requirements for voting in all Osage elections except for the mineral council.

== Background ==
In 1887, the United States passed the Dawes Act to begin the allotment of Indian reservations. Since the Osage Nation owned their land, their reservation was not initially allotted. The Osage Nation signed its first oil lease in 1896 when Chief James Bigheart leased the entire reservation to Henry and Edwin B. Foster for a period of ten years. The Fosters founded the Indian Territory Illuminating Oil Company. In 1906, a statute allotting the Osage Reservation was passed that included two unique clauses. First, the reservation was allotted only to citizens of the Osage Nation and second, the mineral rights (including coal, natural gas, and oil) for the reservation would continue to be owned collectively by the Osage Nation. In 1907 every member of the Osage Nation was given one headright; a total of 2,229 headrights were created. Each headright was entitled to an equal share (1/2,229th) of the income from the Osage Mineral Estate.

Private companies would negotiate leases with the Osage Nation and then pay the Bureau of Indian Affairs (BIA) according to the terms of those leases. The BIA would then hold the funds in a trust and distribute payments quarterly. The headright system was accompanied by federal laws creating guardianships for many Osage people.

== History ==
Initially, Osage headrights could be inherited by non-Osage people. In 1925, the United States banned the transfer of Osage headrights to non-Osage from Osage citizens with a blood quantum over 1/2. In 1978, the 1925 legislation was amended, eliminating the blood quantum language and extending the inheritance of Osage mineral headrights to legally adopted children of Osage people (Osage or non-Osage) and the descendants of those adopted children, in addition to lineal heirs of the Osage people. In 1984, Congress passed legislation that, according to the Osage Nation, effectively prohibits non-Osage headright owners from returning their headrights to the Osage Nation. The legislation bars the transfer of Osage headrights by non-Osage headright holders and requires they return the headrights under a tiered preference system. The preferences require the non-Osage headright holder to first attempt to sell the headright to the linear descendants of its original owner, then the purchase by "any other Osage," and only if the other two preferences cannot be fulfilled can the headrights then be returned to the Osage Nation.

Since 2021, the Osage Nation Minerals Council has been advocating changing federal law to make it easier for non-Osage citizens to return their Osage headrights to the Osage Nation. A bill to do so was sponsored by Frank Lucas, but as of 2023 has not passed.

=== Headrights and voting in the Osage Nation ===
Between 1907 and 1942, only male Osage Nation citizens over 21 years old with a headright on the original roll were eligible to vote in elections for the Osage Tribal Council. In 1942, the Office of Indian Affairs changed the election rules to allow women and any descendant of an original enrollee who owned a headright to vote. This rule effectively limited Osage Nation citizenship to Osage people who had retained their headrights during the period when headrights were allowed to be willed to non-Osage people and institutions. By 2004, only 4,000 of the 16,000 descendants of the original enrollees were eligible to vote in elections. Osage law also equated votes for tribal government elections with headright shares. This led to some tribal members having fractional votes while others possessed multiple votes in Osage elections. The 2006 Osage Nation Constitution opened up citizenship to all descendants of the original enrollees and removed the headright requirement for voting in Osage Nations elections. However, while the Osage Principal Chief, Assistant Principal Chief, and Tribal Council are elected by all Osage tribal citizens, the Osage Mineral Council is still elected solely by headright holders.

=== Contemporary non-Osage ownership ===
As of 2023, about a quarter of the 2,229 Osage headrights are held by non-Osage citizens. Non-Osage owners include the Oklahoma Historical Society, University of Oklahoma, University of Texas, Stanford University, the Catholic Church (including the Roman Catholic Archdiocese of New York, the Roman Catholic Diocese of Tulsa, St. Mary's in Barnsdall, and the Immaculate Conception Church of Pawhuska), various other churches, (Note: Such as the Osage Indian Baptist Church in Pawhuska, and Methodist, Presbyterian, Christ Scientist, Assembly of God churches and The First Assembly of God in Kalamazoo, Michigan.) companies, (Note: Such as Aladdin Oil, Tenneco, Hefner Energy, Wells-Fargo, Sabine Royalty Trust, and the defunct Hissom Memorial) the estate of Daniel J. Boorstin, the Frank Phillips Foundation, and the Drummond family. Some of these entities, such as the Oklahoma Historical Society, have sought to return the headrights to the Osage Nation, but the process is slowed due to complex laws passed in 1984.
