= Osage Hills =

Hilly area in Oklahoma

Coordinates: 36.842°N 96.419°W

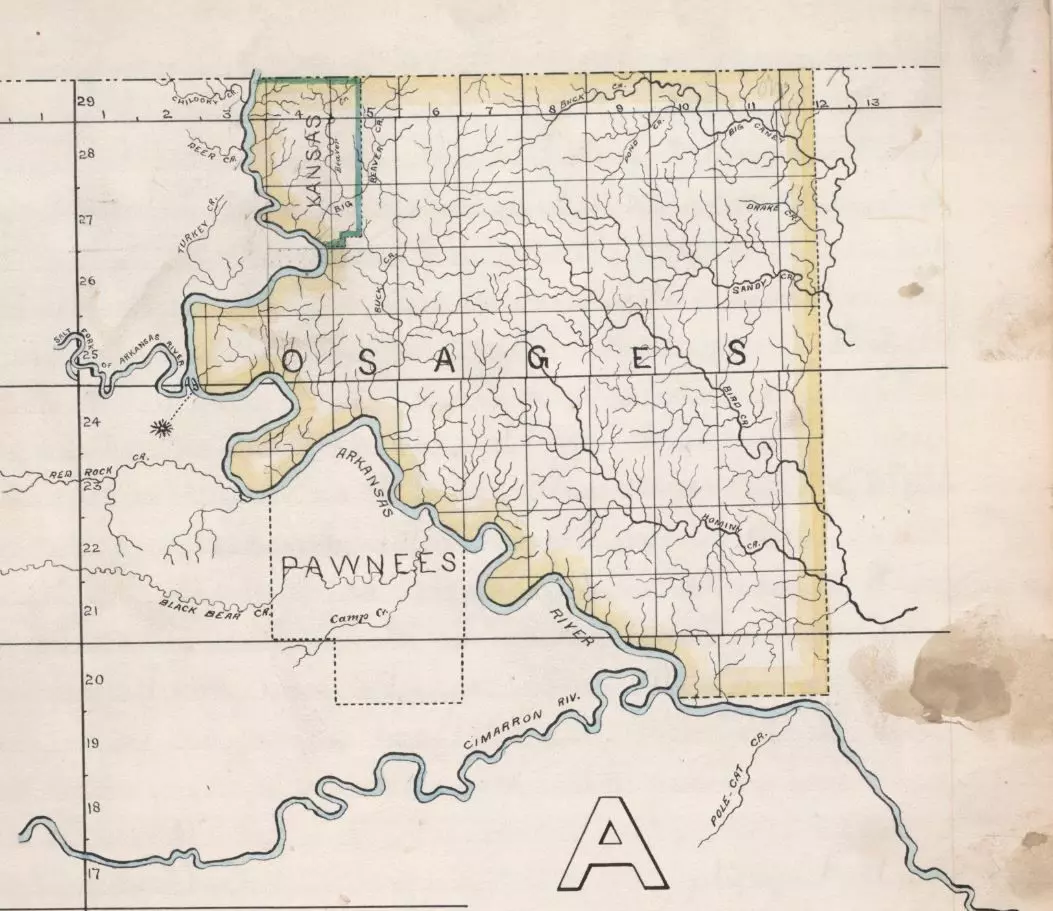
The area of the Osage Hills corresponds to the Osage and Kansas Indian Reservations shown on this 1890 map.

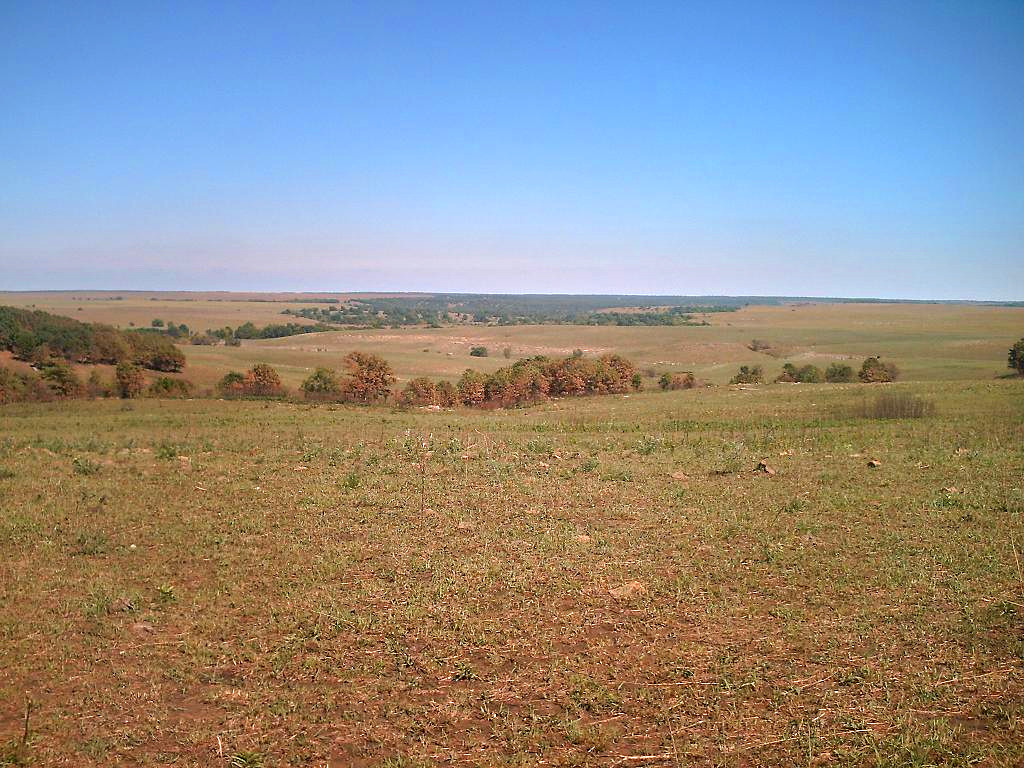
The Tallgrass Prairie Preserve in the Osage Hills.

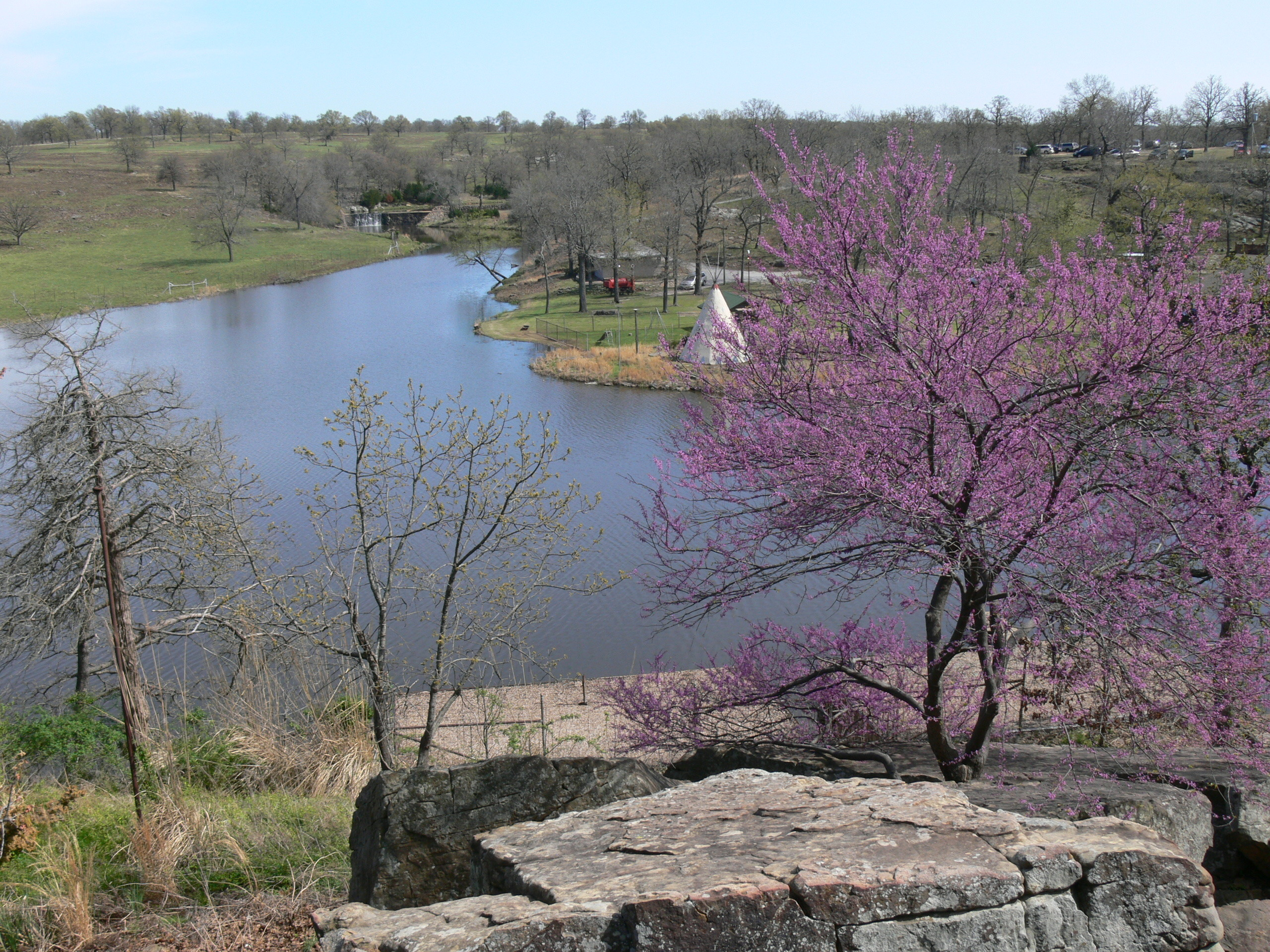
The lake and landscape at Woolaroc museum and wildlife preserve

The Osage Hills is a hilly area in Oklahoma, commonly known as The Osage which refers to its association with the Osage Indian (Native American) tribe. The Osage is characterized by broad rolling hills, tallgrass prairie, and the Cross Timbers encompassing Osage County and surrounding areas, including portions of Tulsa, Washington and Kay Counties. It is the southern extension of the Flint Hills of Kansas and is part of a larger physiographic region called the Osage Plains.

== Geography ==
The Osage contains some of the largest remaining remnants of the tallgrass prairie that covered much of the Great Plains. Kansans refer to the northern portion of this same prairie system as the Flint Hills.

The Osage, more formally called the Osage Hills, has an area of approximately 2,700 sq mi (7,000 km^{2}), including all of Osage County. The northern boundary of the region is the border with Kansas; the western and southern boundaries are the Arkansas River; and the eastern boundary is the cities of Bartlesville and Tulsa. The region is characterized by the outcrops of limestone, shale, and chert. Only shallow soil covers layers of sub-surface rock which renders the area difficult for cultivation. For that reason most of the Osage Hills retains its original vegetation of which tallgrass prairie dominates. Big bluestem is the most common grass. Forests are found along streams and the eastern part of the hills has a north-south band of dwarf oak forest called the Cross Timbers region. The Cross Timbers are often classified as a separate geographical region, but culturally they are part of The Osage. They are a transition zone between eastern deciduous forests and western grasslands.

Relief is modest. Tulsa has an elevation above sea level of 636 ft (194 m). The highest elevations are about 1,300 ft (400 m). Precipitation decreases from east to west. Bartlesville in the east gets 40 in (1,000 mm) of precipitation annually; Ponca City in the west gets 30 in (760 mm) annually. Summers are hot and humid with temperatures over 100 °F (38 °C) common; winters are mild to cold. Temperatures rarely fall below 0 °F (−18 °C).

Large cattle ranches characterize most of the land use. The town of Pawhuska is the county seat and is approximately in the center of the Osage Hills. The Tallgrass Prairie Preserve consists of about 40,000 acres (16,000 ha) of land and features a herd of more than 2,000 free-roaming bison.

== History and economy ==
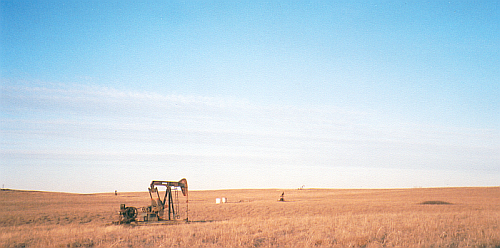
Oil is still important to the Osage Hills economy.

In the 1830s the U.S. government forced the Cherokee to move west from their southern Appalachian homeland to the north eastern part of what later became Oklahoma. In the 1870s both the Osage and Kaw (also called "Kansas" and "Kansa") had reservations in Kansas but their lands were overrun by white settlers (including the parents of Laura Wilder of "Little House on the Prairie" fame). Their presence untenable in Kansas the two tribes were forced to move to Oklahoma by the U.S. government. The Osage sold their remaining lands in Kansas and with the proceeds purchased 1,570,000 acres (640,000 ha) of land from the Cherokee for their new home. About 100,000 acres (40,000 ha) of the purchase was allocated to the Kaw. The resultant Osage Reservation is coincident with Osage County. The smaller Kaw Reservation is in Kay County. Together these two homes of the Osage and the Kaw Indian tribes make up practically all of what is traditionally called The Osage. The fact that the Osage purchased their lands gave them more rights than many Indians who were forced to survive as near-wards of the government.

The Osage chose to buy poor agricultural land in Oklahoma in the hope that they would not be molested by white settlers. In the early 1900s, the Kaw and Osage were forced to cede some of their land for white settlement in a process called "allotment", but the Osage retained the mineral rights of all the land on their reservation. Beneath the rocky soil were vast reservoirs of petroleum. The Nellie Johnstone No. 1, a well drilled near present-day Bartlesville, struck oil on April 15, 1897, and became the first of thousands of commercial oil wells in Oklahoma. By the 1920s, the Osage were the richest ethnic group in the world -- but were also under intense pressure from white opportunists attempting to take their wealth, including by the violence called the Osage Indian murders.

Petroleum continues to be a source of revenue for the Osage tribe. Oil wells often dot pastures where cattle graze. Cattle ranching is the other main economic activity of the region. Osage country is second among counties in Oklahoma in the number of its cattle and first in number of horses and bison.

== Attractions ==
Prominent attractions in the Osage Hills include the Osage Hills State Park, Tulsa Botanic Garden, Tulsa's Gilcrease Museum (which has extensive gardens covering 23 acres (93,000 m^{2}); Woolaroc and The Nature Conservancy's Tallgrass Prairie Preserve which offers long vistas of tallgrass prairies and buffalo herds. Kaw Lake and the Arkansas River in Kay Country form the western boundary of the Osage.

Several enterprises or organizations in the area use Osage Hills to identify themselves with the area; including Osage Hills Public Schools in Bartlesville and Osage Hills State Park west of Bartlesville. Other areas within Oklahoma, Kansas, and Missouri also may use the name "Osage Hills" although may not actually be within the specific Osage Hills area.

== See also ==
- Cincinnati Hill
- Oklahoma Hills
- Osage Indian murders
- Osage Plains

== Bibliography ==
- Kappler, Charles (Ed.). "PART III.—ACTS OF FIFTY–NINTH CONGRESS—FIRST SESSION, 1906 (Chapter 3572, June 28, 1906 [H.R. 15333] - [Public, No. 321] 34 Stat., 539. "An act for the division of the lands and funds of the Osage Indians etc." Indian Affairs: Laws and Treaties. Washington: Government Printing Office, 1913. 3:252-258 (accessed September 25, 2006).
