= Osage Mission's post =

- eastern Neosho County, Kansas

Site information
- Type: intermittent U.S. Army post
- Controlled by: various Union troops

Location
- Coordinates: 37.5178°N 95.1718°W

Site history
- Built: ca. December 1862
- In use: ca. December 1862 - June 1865

Garrison information
- Past commanders: Capt. Jacob G. Rees, Capt. Curtis Johnson
- Garrison: same

Osage Mission's post was located at the Osage Catholic Mission, which was established in 1847. Eventually, Osage Mission became the town of St. Paul, Kansas, United States, within what would become Neosho County.

== History ==
The mission was located about 35 miles (56 km) north of the Kansas-Indian Territory border. Indian Territory eventually became the state of Oklahoma. When the Civil War erupted, Father John Schoenmakers wanted to keep the mission as neutral ground and thus out of the conflict. Although Schoenmakers had to flee for a time, he largely succeeded in keeping Osage Mission itself out of harm's way.

At the mission, Schoenmakers was responsible for the Western education of many Osage children who remembered him fondly years later. A church in Oklahoma has 36 ft. tall stained glass windows of his likeness, showing his ministry to the Osage Indians.

Both Union and Confederate troops operated in the area surrounding Osage Mission, and at times troops from both sides entered it. From 1862 to 1865 Union troops were sometimes stationed at Osage Mission, almost certainly on its outskirts. Troops were first mentioned as being at the mission was in a military report on December 16, 1862. The troops left at some point, and were back by October 1863, when Confederate guerrillas were at the mission for a time.

In November 1863, Confederates entered the mission. The small force there, under a sergeant, was powerless to effectively drive them off. A company of Union troops was called in and drove them off. It appears that a larger body of troops was posted to the mission, probably permanently until the post was deactivated in June 1865.
