= Pawhuska, Oklahoma =

Pawhuska, Oklahoma 𐓄𐓘𐓢𐓶𐓮𐓤𐓘
- City
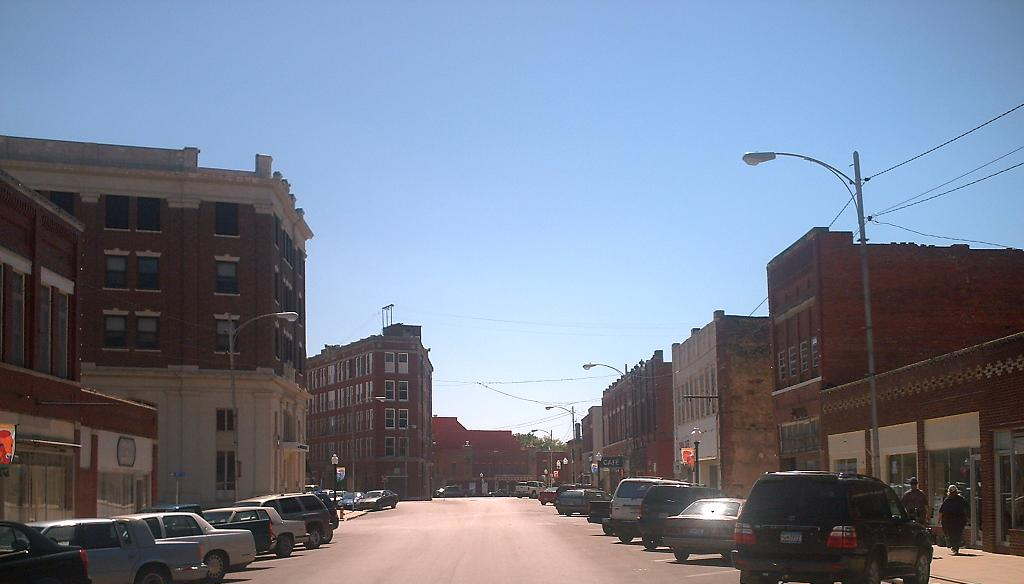
- Historic Downtown Pawhuska (2005)

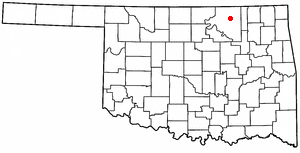
- Location within Oklahoma
- Coordinates: 36°40′09″N 96°19′59″W
- Country: United States
- State: Oklahoma
- County: Osage
- Founded: 1872 (Deep Ford)
- Named for: Paw-Hiu-Skah

Government
  - Mayor: Steve Tolson

Area
  - Total: 3.71 sq mi (9.61 km^{2})
  - Land: 3.69 sq mi (9.57 km^{2})
  - Water: 0.015 sq mi (0.04 km^{2})
- Elevation: 820 ft (250 m)

Population (2020)
  - Total: 2,984
  - Density: 808/sq mi (312/km^{2})
- Time zone: UTC-6 (Central (CST))
  - Summer (DST): UTC-5 (CDT)
- ZIP codes: 74056
- Area code: 539/918
- FIPS code: 40-57600
- GNIS ID: 2411388
- Website: Official website

Pawhuska (/pɒˈhʌskə/ paw-HUSK-ə; Osage: 𐓅𐓘𐓢𐓶𐓮𐓤𐓘, romanized: hpahúska, lit. 'White Hair'; Iowa-Oto: Paháhga) is a city in and the county seat of Osage County, Oklahoma, United States. As of the 2020 census, the population of the city was 2,984. It was named after the 19th-century Osage chief Paw-Hiu-Skah, which means 'White Hair' in English. The Osage tribal government, which opened offices in Pawhuska in 1872 when its reservation was established in Indian Territory, continues to be based in Pawhuska.

== History ==
The town, originally known as Deep Ford, was established in 1872 with the reservation for the Osage Nation, part of Indian Territory. The Osage Indian Agency was located along Bird Creek. One of the three main bands of the tribe settled here. Traders followed, building stores during 1872 and 1873. Pawhuska's first newspaper, the Indian Herald (also known as Wah-Sha-She News.), was founded in 1875 by George Edward Tinker, an Osage who became the father of Clarence L. Tinker, highest-ranking Native American officer in the US Army. The first post office opened in 1876.

The Midland Valley Railroad reached Pawhuska in September 1905. By the time of statehood in 1907, the town population was 2,407.

The first Boy Scout troop was organized in Pawhuska in May 1909 by John F. Mitchell, a missionary priest from England sent to St. Thomas Episcopal Church by the Church of England. On Independence day weekend 2009, the Pawhuska Boy Scout troop celebrated its centennial with a mini-jamboree attended by over 300 Scouts from across the United States.

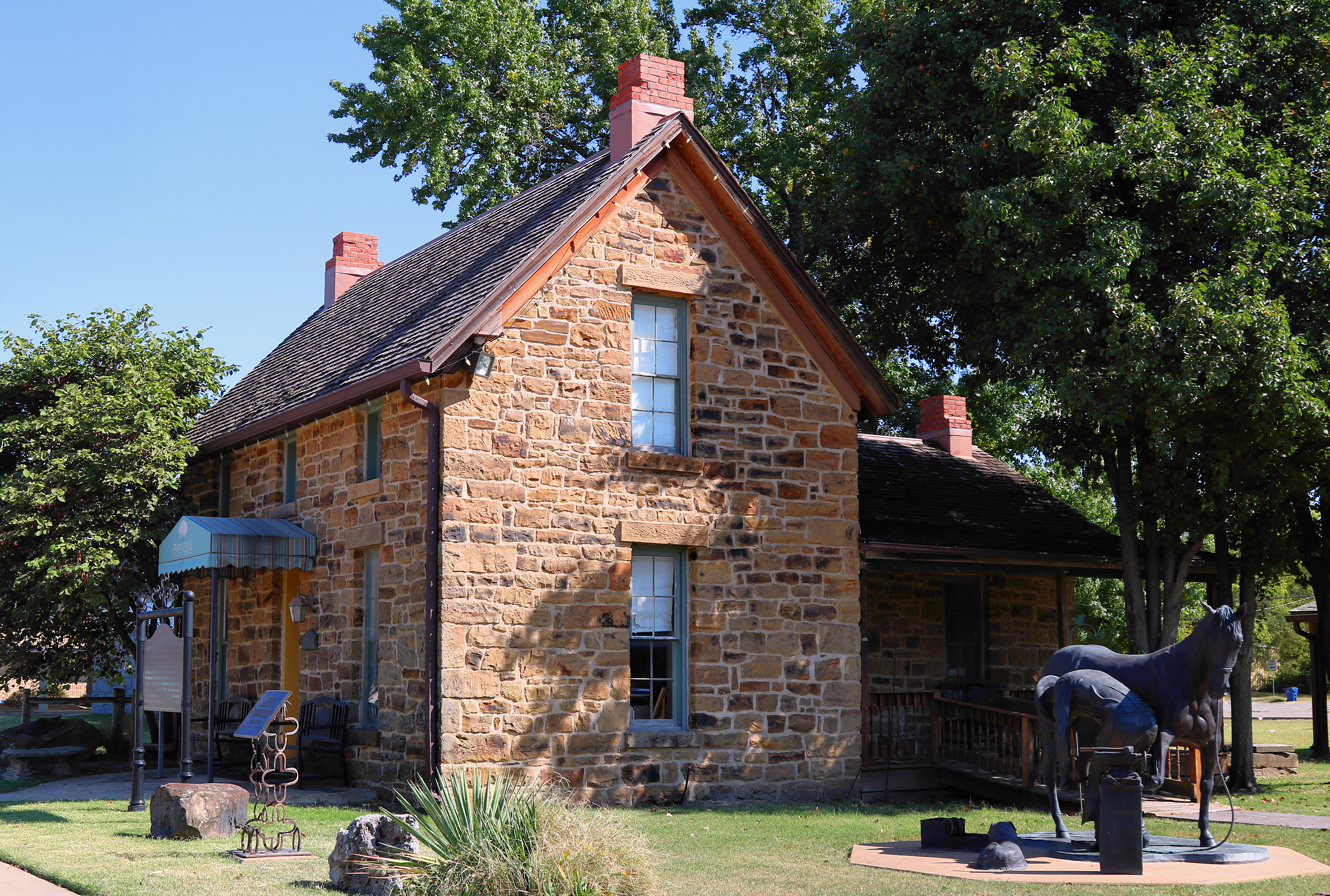
The historic sandstone Blacksmith's House in Pawhuska, Oklahoma. Listed on the National Register of Historic Places.

During the Osage oil boom of the 1910s and 1920s, Pawhuska was the site of big-money public auctions of oil and gas leases under the so-called “Million Dollar Elm” next to the Osage Council House. The population grew to 6,414 by 1920. The Atchison, Topeka and Santa Fe Railway extended its line from Owen, a community in Washington County, to Pawhuska in 1923. As the oil boom declined and the Great Depression set in, the population declined. The steady decline has continued to the present.

Minor league baseball came to Pawhuska briefly in the 1920s in the form of two teams: the Pawhuska Huskers, which operated from 1920 to 1921, and the Pawhuska Osages, which operated for part of the 1922 season before folding.

== Geography ==
Pawhuska is 57 miles (92 km) northwest of Tulsa. According to the United States Census Bureau, the city has a total area of 3.8 square miles (9.8 km^{2}), all land. The city sits in the approximate center of the Osage Hills region, popularly called The Osage. Pawhuska is in USDA plant hardiness zone 7a (0 to 5 °F; −18 to −15 °C). The Tallgrass Prairie Preserve lies north of the town.

== Demographics ==
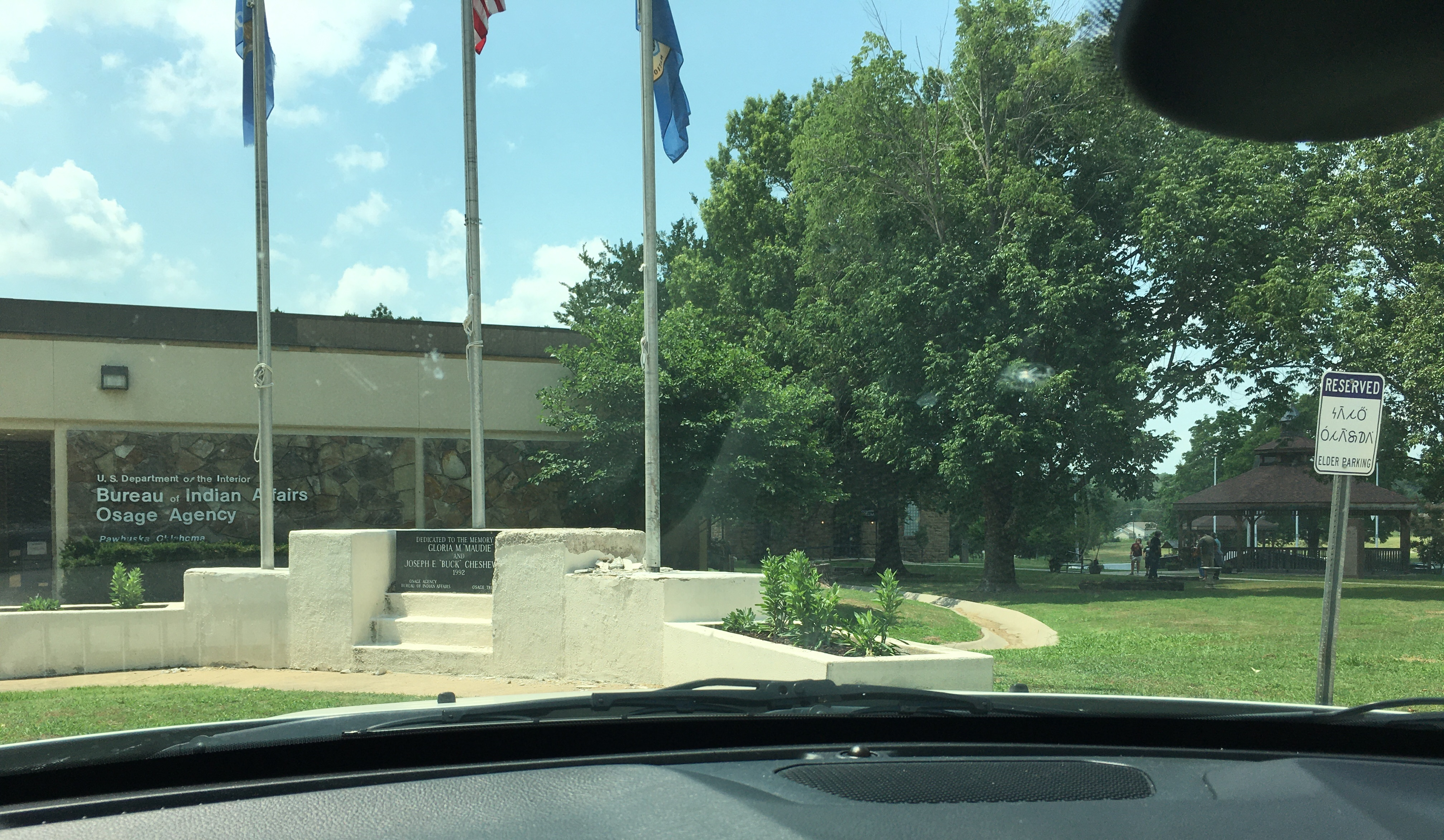
Bureau of Indian Affairs' Osage Agency building in Pawhuska, adjacent to the Osage Nation Campus (2022)

Historical population
Census	Pop.	Note	%±
1910	2,776		—
1920	6,414		131.1%
1930	5,931		−7.5%
1940	5,443		−8.2%
1950	5,331		−2.1%
1960	5,414		1.6%
1970	4,278		−21.0%
1980	4,771		11.5%
1990	3,825		−19.8%
2000	3,629		−5.1%
2010	3,584		−1.2%
2020	2,984		−16.7%
U.S. Decennial Census

Pawhuska is in the Tulsa metropolitan area, which includes part of Osage County.

=== 2020 census ===
As of the 2020 census, Pawhuska had a population of 2,984. The median age was 38.9 years. 27.0% of residents were under the age of 18 and 18.3% of residents were 65 years of age or older. For every 100 females there were 98.8 males, and for every 100 females age 18 and over there were 89.1 males age 18 and over.

0% of residents lived in urban areas, while 100.0% lived in rural areas.

There were 1,252 households in Pawhuska, of which 28.8% had children under the age of 18 living in them. Of all households, 37.5% were married-couple households, 21.6% were households with a male householder and no spouse or partner present, and 35.1% were households with a female householder and no spouse or partner present. About 38.4% of all households were made up of individuals and 17.6% had someone living alone who was 65 years of age or older.

There were 1,530 housing units, of which 18.2% were vacant. Among occupied housing units, 66.2% were owner-occupied and 33.8% were renter-occupied. The homeowner vacancy rate was 2.8% and the rental vacancy rate was 8.8%.

Racial composition as of the 2020 census
Race	Percent
White	51.3%
Black or African American	2.7%
American Indian and Alaska Native	30.8%
Asian	0.2%
Native Hawaiian and Other Pacific Islander	<0.1%
Some other race	1.6%
Two or more races	13.3%
Hispanic or Latino (of any race)	5.6%

=== 2010 census ===
The population of the city was 3,589 at the 2010 census, a decline of 1.2 percent from 3,629 at the 2000 census.

=== 2000 census ===
As of the census of 2000, there were 3,629 people, 1,513 households, and 954 families residing in the city. The population density was 966.4 inhabitants per square mile (373.1/km^{2}). There were 1,802 housing units at an average density of 479.9 per square mile (185.3/km^{2}). The racial makeup of the city was 64.98% White, 2.78% African American, 25.46% Native American, 0.25% Asian, 0.52% from other races, and 6.01% from two or more races. Hispanic or Latino of any race were 1.85% of the population.

There were 1,513 households, out of which 29.5% had children under the age of 18 living with them, 44.7% were married couples living together, 14.4% had a female householder with no husband present, and 36.9% were non-families. 33.8% of all households were made up of individuals, and 18.1% had someone living alone who was 65 years of age or older. The average household size was 2.37 and the average family size was 3.02.

In the city, the population was spread out, with 27.8% under the age of 18, 7.3% from 18 to 24, 23.0% from 25 to 44, 22.2% from 45 to 64, and 19.8% who were 65 years of age or older. The median age was 39 years. For every 100 females, there were 88.1 males. For every 100 females age 18 and over, there were 78.2 males.

The median income for a household in the city was $25,156, and the median income for a family was $31,599. Males had a median income of $25,682 versus $17,690 for females. The per capita income for the city was $13,916. About 13.7% of families and 17.5% of the population were below the poverty line, including 22.3% of those under age 18 and 14.9% of those age 65 or over.

== Economy ==
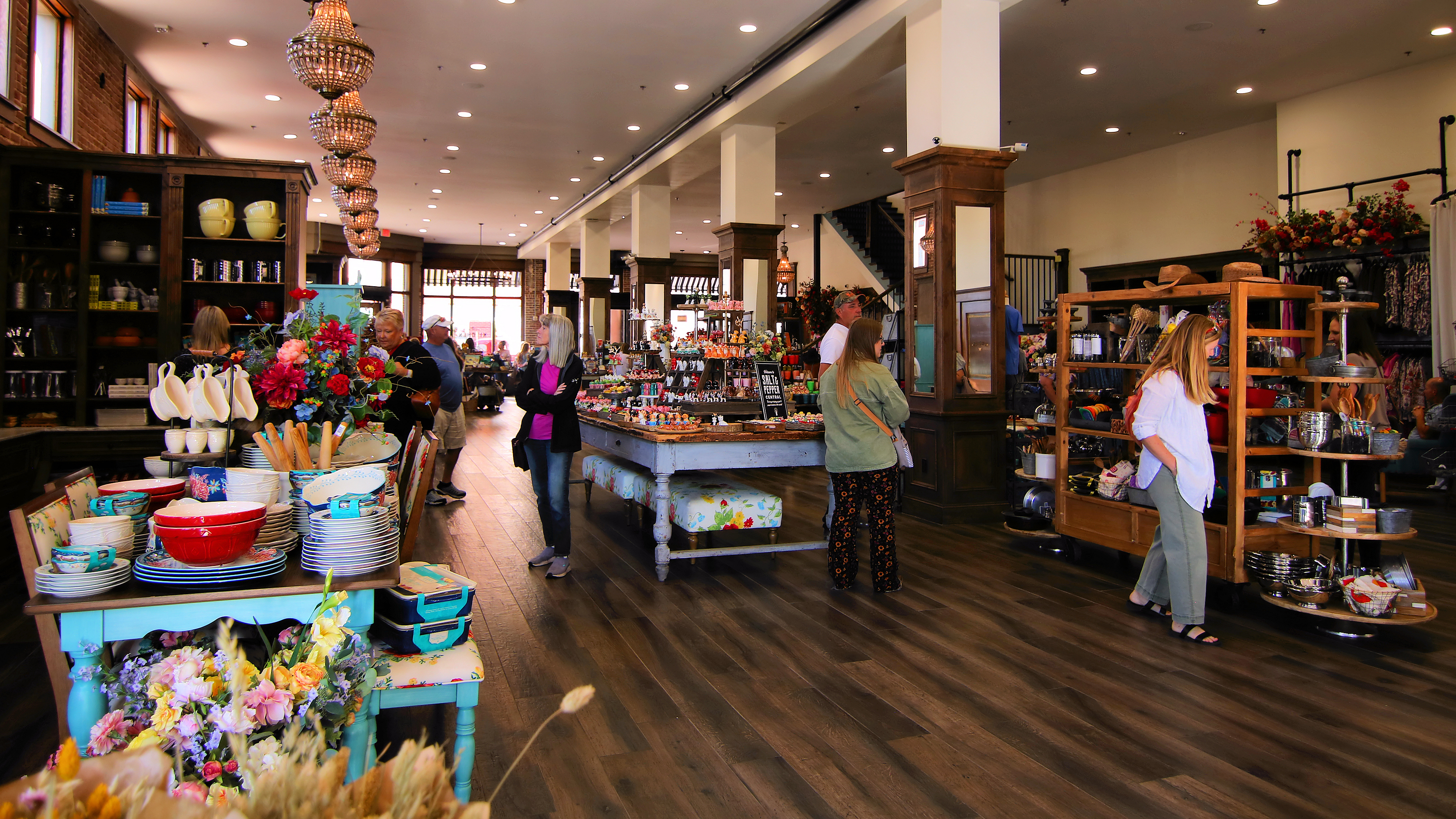
The Pioneer Woman Mercantile in Pawhuska. Listed on the National Register of Historic Places.

Other than cattle ranches nearby, local employment consisted primarily of a brick plant, a creamery, an ice factory, and a rock crusher. The Osage Nation has opened a gaming casino here, hoping to generate revenue for the tribe.

In 2016, "Pioneer Woman" Ree Drummond opened The Mercantile on Main Street. Since 2011 she has had a TV series, named after her blog, on The Food Network. Her store and restaurant are related ventures. By 2018 the restaurant was serving up to 6,000 people per day.She offers tours of her cooking lodge on nearby Drummond Ranch, the base for her TV show, The Pioneer Woman.

== Government ==
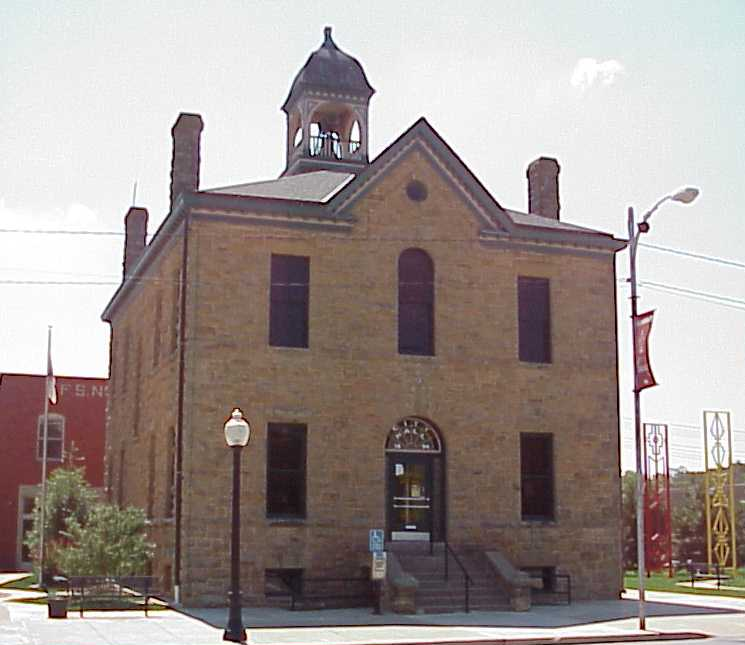
Pawhuska City Hall (2007)

Pawhuska has a home rule charter form of government.

== Education ==
The area is served by Pawhuska Public Schools, which operates Pawhuska High School.

There is a private Osage language immersion preschool through 7th grade school, Daposka Ahnkodapi Elementary School. It opened in 2015 and was accredited in 2021. The school was closed, at least temporarily, in 2026.

Oklahoma State University has an Osage County Extension Office near Pawhuska.

In the past there was a federally-run boarding school for Osage students. It was known as the McCabe Boarding School, a.k.a. Osage Boarding School a.k.a. Pawhuska Boarding School. It began around 1889 and closed at a point up to 1893. Additionally, St. Louis School for Osage Indian Girls, created by the Roman Catholic Church, began in 1887 and closed at a point up to 1949.

== Media ==
Radio stations licensed to Pawhuska include:

- KPGM Radio 1500 AM, featuring local news until 8:00am and the Sports Animal Format out of Oklahoma City
- KOSG 103.9 FM, featuring Southern Gospel music.

The local newspaper is the Pawhuska Journal-Capital. Its roots go back to two papers which subsequently merged: The Capital and The Journal, each established in 1904. The Journal-Capital has been in continuous publication under that name since April 6, 1925.

== Infrastructure ==
=== Transportation ===
Pawhuska is served by one U.S. Highway and two state highways.

- US-60 is an east–west highway that enters Pawhuska on the east side of town at the junction of SH-99/SH-11 and follows Main Street. The highway will exit Pawhuska to the west near Elk Lodge Drive.
- SH-11 is a predominately east–west state highway that enters Pawhuska on the east side of town at the junction of US-60/OK-99 and runs along Main Street. Like US-60, the highway will exit Pawhuska to the west near Elk Lodge Drive.
- SH-99 is a north–south state highway. SH-99 will skirt Pawhuska on the east side of town and run concurrently with US-60 to Main Street, where it will continue south. SH-99 will then overlap OK-11 until the highway exits Pawhuska near Osage County Road 2625.

Pawhuska Municipal Airport, FAA Identifier H76, is a single runway airport located on US-60 and Osage County Road 4291, about four miles west of the city. Runway 35/17 is paved, 3,200-foot-long (980 m) and 60-foot-wide (18 m). The airport opened in September 1945.

== Notable people ==
- Louis F. Burns (Osage), historian and author of 13 books about the Osage Indians
- Bill Campbell, American football player
- G. R. Carter, jockey
- Ree Drummond, blogger, author, food writer and television personality
- Lucy Tayiah Eads, Kaw tribal chief
- Ben Johnson, actor
- M. John Kane IV, Oklahoma Supreme Court Justice
- John Joseph Mathews (Osage), historian and author
- Paul Miller, journalist
- Carter Revard, writer and poet
- William Salyers, actor
- Mitch Schauer, creator of The Angry Beavers
- Larry Sellers, actor
- Shockley Shoemake, Oklahoma state legislator and lawyer
- Clarence L. Tinker (Osage), United States Air Force general and namesake of Tinker Air Force Base

== In popular culture ==
- In 1930, prairie and oilfield scenes for the film Cimarron were filmed in Pawhuska.
- Tracy Letts' Pulitzer Prize-winning play August: Osage County (2007) is set in a country house near Pawhuska, and the 2013 film of the same name was partially filmed there.
- The Terrence Malick film To the Wonder (2012) was partially filmed in Pawhuska.
- The movie Killers of the Flower Moon (2023) was primarily filmed in Pawhuska.
- Pro wrestler Chief Jay Strongbow was billed as coming from Pawhuska, although he actually hailed from Nutley, New Jersey.

== Sister cities ==
- Montauban (France)
