= Louis F. Burns =

Osage historian (1920–2012)

- Hulah Kiheka
- Born: January 2, 1920; Elgin, Kansas, U.S.
- Died: May 20, 2012 (aged 92); Pawhuska, Oklahoma, U.S.
- Citizenship: Osage Nation, American
- Occupations: Historian, author
- Spouse: Ruth Blake (1945-2006)

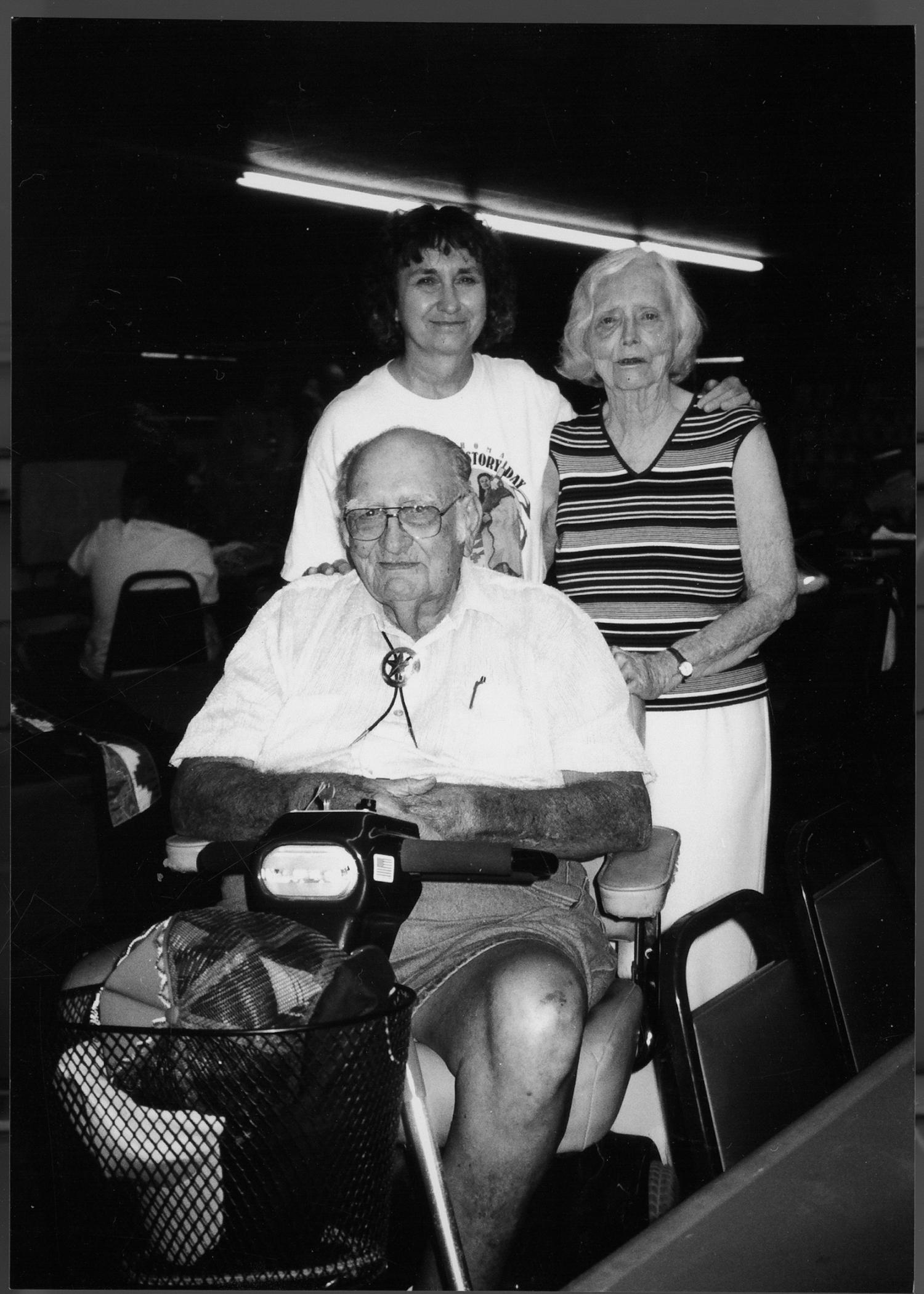
Louis F Burns - Osage Nation Member, Author, Historian

Louis Francis Burns (Osage: Hulah Kiheka, January 2, 1920 – May 20, 2012) was a Native American historian, author, and teacher, known as a leading expert on the history, oral history and culture of the Osage Nation. Burns wrote more than a dozen books and scholarly works on the Osage people. In 2002 he was inducted into the Oklahoma Historians Hall of Fame.

== Biography ==
=== Early life and marriage ===
Burns was born on January 2, 1920, in Elgin, Kansas, to Robert Lee and Bessie (née Tinker) Burns. His mother, Bessie, an Osage allottee, was a member of the prominent Tinker family. Burns chronicled their history in his self-published book, Turn of the Wheel: A Genealogy of the Burns and Tinker Families (1980), which also explores a considerable amount of Osage history. Through his mother, Burns was descended from the Little Bear/Strike Axe band of Little Osages, and was a member of the tribe's Mottled Eagle Clan.

He was one-eighth Osage/Kansas, and his Osage name was Hulah Kiheka (Eagle Chief). He became a member of the I’n Lon Schka Society, which organizes the important ceremonial dance. Burns was raised on a cattle ranch within the Osage Reservation.

During World War II, Burns served in the United States Marine Corps in the Central and South Pacific Campaigns. Soon after returning to the United States from the war, he married Ruth Blake in 1945.

=== Career ===
Burns received both a bachelor's degree in education and a master's degree in history from Kansas State Teachers College at Emporia. (Since 1977 and expansion of programs, the college has been known as Emporia State University). He later worked on a doctorate at the University of Southern California in Los Angeles.

Burns graduated from the Spartan College of Aeronautics and Technology, a private aeronautical college in Tulsa, Oklahoma. He worked for the Lockheed Corporation in California and Beech Aircraft in Wichita, Kansas, during the course of his career.

In addition to work in the aeronautical industry, Burns also held positions as an educator and lecturer. He taught high school in the communities of Shawnee Mission, Kansas, and Santa Ana, California. He served as an instructor and lecturer at his alma mater, Emporia State University, and Santiago Community College in Orange County, California.

=== Osage historian ===
Burns wrote 13 books on the history, culture, and cosmology of the Osage Nation. His best-known work, A History of the Osage People (1989), included material from much of his earlier research and publications.

Burns also contributed research as a columnist, feature writer, and editor. He wrote for the Osage Nation News and Inside Osage as a feature writer. He also contributed numerous articles on the Osage to the Chronicles of Oklahoma. Burns served as the editor of two educational newsletters.

He presented scholarly papers for the Plains Indian Seminars at the Buffalo Bill Historical Center in Wyoming in 1989, 1992 (his paper "Missionaries, Fur Traders, and Osage Ribbon Work" was published in The Artist and the Missionary: Proceedings of the 1992 Plains Indian Seminar), 1997, and 1999. In each case the proceedings were published. He presented papers at the Oklahoma Historical Society in 1996, 1997, 1998 and 1999, and the Missouri Valley Historical Society in 1996 in Omaha.

He also collected artifacts from Osage history. Burns donated much of his collection to the Osage Nation Museum in Pawhuska, Oklahoma. Burns also contributed extensively to the Oklahoma Historical Society. His donations to the Historical Society are housed in a new, purpose-built wing at the White Hair Memorial in Ralston, Oklahoma.

Burns died at his home in Pawhuska, Oklahoma, on May 20, 2010, at the age of 92. He was buried at Pawhuska City Cemetery with both U.S. military honors and traditional Osage customs and rites. Burns was survived by his two children, Keith Burns and Alice (Burns) Thomas. His wife, Ruth, died in 2006 after 61 years of marriage. In a dedication to her in one of his books, Burns said his wife was, "My best friend and harshest critic." The director of the Osage Nation Museum, Kathryn Red Corn, described Burns's death as a loss for the Osage Nation, saying, "He will truly be missed by the Osage people...Mr. Burns was a good friend to our museum. He was a repository of tribal history."

== Works ==
Burns's research materials are housed by the University of Arkansas at Little Rock in the Sequoyah Research Center of the American Native Press Archives. The University of Arkansas's Louis F. Burns Collection has papers related to his scholarly research, which spanned more than fifty years.

His publications include numerous articles and ten books, including:

- Treaties, Constitution, and Laws of the Osage Nation (reprint ed., 1967);
- Turn of the Wheel (1980);
- The Osage Annuity Rolls of 1878, 3 vols., (1980–81);
- Osage Indian Bands and Clans (1984);
- Osage Indian Customs and Myths (1984);
- Osage Mission Baptisms, Marriages, and Interments, 1820-1886 (1986);
- A History of the Osage People (1989); and
- Symbolic and Decorative Art of the Osage People (1994).

== Legacy and honors ==
- 2002, Burns was inducted into the Oklahoma Historians Hall of Fame. He joined another prominent Osage author, John Joseph Mathews, the late historian and Osage Council member, who had been posthumously inducted in 1996.
- Burns was knighted by the Companions of l'Hippocras (Chevalier de l'Hippocras du Therme).
- He was listed in the 27th edition of Marquis, Who's Who in the West, the 19th edition of Marquis, Who's Who in the World, and forthcoming Who's Who in America. He is also listed in the British International Men of Achievement, Dictionary of International Biography, and 2,000 Outstanding Scholars of the Twentieth Century.
