= Osage Nation =

Native American tribe in Oklahoma

The Osage Nation 𐓁𐓣 𐓂𐓤𐓘𐓯𐓤𐓘͘ Ni Okašką (People of the Middle Waters) Osage Reservation
- Indian reservation
- Flag Seal
- Motto: 𐓏𐓘𐓻𐓘𐓻𐓟 𐓇𐓪͘𐓯𐓪͘𐓷𐓟 (English: Wahzhazhe Always)
- The location of the Osage Reservation in Oklahoma
- Tribe: Osage Nation
- Country: United States
- State: Oklahoma
- County: Osage
- Headtown: Pawhuska

Government
  - Type: Republic
  - Body: Osage Nation Congress
  - Principal Chief: Joseph Dee Tillman (D)
  - Assistant Principal Chief: John Shaw (D)

Area
  - Total: 2,200 sq mi (5,700 km^{2})

Population (2017)
  - Total: 47,350
  - Density: 22/sq mi (8.3/km^{2})
- Time zone: UTC-6
  - Summer (DST): UTC-5 (central)
- Website: osagenation-nsn.gov

Osage Nation
𐓁𐓣 𐓂𐓤𐓘𐓯𐓤𐓘͘ Ni Okašką

Total population
- 24,000

Regions with significant populations
- United States historically Missouri, Oklahoma, Arkansas, and Kansas. The majority of Osage citizens still live in Oklahoma, but many others live and work in different American states.

Languages
- Osage, English, formerly French

Religion
- Indigenous religion, Inlonshka, Christianity, Native American Church

Related ethnic groups
- other Dhegihan Siouan-speaking peoples (Ponca, Kansa, Quapaw, Omaha)

𐓏𐓘𐓻𐓘𐓻𐓟 (Wažaže) 'Middle Waters'
- People: 𐓏𐓘𐓻𐓘𐓻𐓟 (Wažaže)
- Language: 𐓏𐓘𐓻𐓘𐓻𐓟𐓣𐓟 (Wažažeie)
- Country: 𐓏𐓘𐓻𐓘𐓻𐓟 𐓀𐓘͘𐓻𐓘͘ (Wažaže Mązhą)

The Osage Nation (/ˈoʊ.seɪdʒ/, OH-sayj) (Osage: 𐓏𐓘𐓻𐓘𐓻𐓟 𐓁𐓣𐓤𐓘𐓯𐓣, romanized: Wažaže Nikaši, lit. 'People of the Middle Waters') is a federally recognized Native American tribe in Oklahoma.

They are an Indigenous people of the Great Plains historically from the Midwestern United States. The tribe began in the Ohio and Mississippi river valleys around 1620 along with other groups of its language family, then migrated west in the 17th century due to Haudenosaunee incursions.

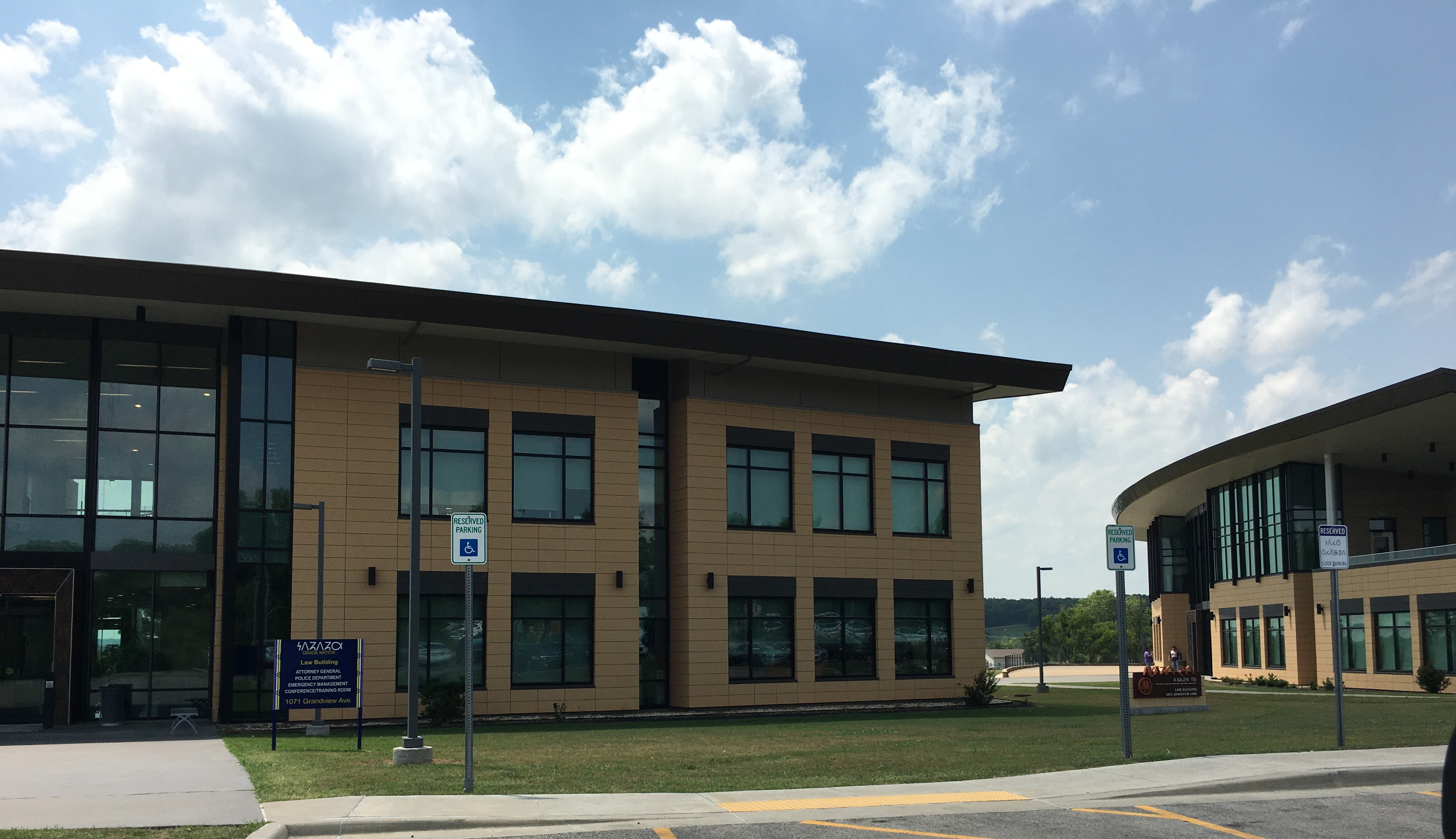
The current Osage Nation government buildings, Pawhuska

The term Osage is a French version, from eau sage, of the tribe's name, which can be roughly translated as 'calm water'. The Osage people refer to themselves in their Dhegihan Siouan language as (𐓏𐓘𐓻𐓘𐓻𐓟, Wazhazhe, 'Middle Waters'). By the early 19th century, the Osage had become the dominant power in the region, feared by neighboring tribes. The tribe controlled the area between the Missouri and Red rivers, the Ozarks to the east and the foothills of the Wichita Mountains to the south. They depended on nomadic buffalo hunting and agriculture. The 19th-century painter George Catlin described the Osage as "the tallest race of men in North America, either red or white skins; there being ... many of them six and a half, and others taller than seven feet [198, 213 cm]." The missionary Isaac McCoy described the Osage as an "uncommonly fierce, courageous, warlike nation" and said they were the "finest looking Indians I have ever seen in the West". In the Ohio Valley, the Osage originally lived among speakers of the same Dhegihan language stock, such as the Kansa, Ponca, Omaha, and Quapaw. Researchers believe that the tribes likely diverged in languages and cultures after leaving the lower Ohio Country. The Omaha and Ponca settled in what is now Nebraska; the Kansa in Kansas; and the Quapaw in Arkansas.

In the 19th century, the Osage were forced by the United States to move from modern-day Kansas into Indian Territory (present-day Oklahoma), and the majority of their descendants live in Oklahoma. In the early 20th century, oil was discovered on their land. They had retained communal mineral rights during the allotment process, and many Osage became wealthy through returns from leasing fees generated by their Osage headrights. During the 1920s and what was known as the Reign of Terror, they suffered manipulation, fraud, and numerous murders by outsiders eager to take over their wealth. In 2011, the nation gained a settlement from the federal government after an 11-year legal struggle over long mismanagement of their oil funds. In 2025, the federally recognized Osage Nation has approximately 25,000 enrolled citizens, 6,780 of whom reside in the tribe's jurisdictional area. Citizens also live outside the nation's tribal land in Oklahoma and in other states around the country. The present tribal lands are bordered by the Cherokee Nation to the east, the Muscogee Nation and the Pawnee Nation to the south, and the Kaw Nation and Oklahoma proper to the west.

== History ==
=== Pre-colonization ===
The Osage are descendants of cultures of Indigenous peoples who had been in North America for thousands of years. Studies of their traditions and language show that they were part of a group of Dhegihan Siouan–speaking people who lived in the Ohio River valley area, extending into present-day Kentucky. According to their own stories, common to other Dhegihan-Siouan tribes, such as the Ponca, Omaha, Kaw and Quapaw, they migrated west as a result of war with the Haudenosaunee and/or to reach more game.

Scholars are divided as to whether they think the Osage and other groups left before the Beaver Wars of the Haudenosaunee. Some believe that the Osage started migrating west as early as 1200 CE and are descendants of the Mississippian culture in the Ohio and Mississippi valleys. They attribute their style of government to effects of the long years of war with invading Haudenosaunee. After resettling west of the Mississippi River, the Osage were sometimes allied with the Illiniwek and sometimes competed with them, as that tribe was also driven west of Illinois by warfare with the powerful Haudenosaunee.

Eventually the Osage and other Dhegihan-Siouan peoples reached their historic lands, likely developing and splitting into the above tribes in the course of the migration to the Great Plains. By the 17th century, many of the Osage had settled near the Osage River in the western part of present-day Missouri. They were recorded in 1690 as having adopted the horse, a valuable resource often acquired through raids on other tribes. The desire to acquire more horses contributed to their trading with the French. They attacked and defeated indigenous Caddo tribes to establish dominance in the Plains region by 1750, with control "over half or more of Missouri, Arkansas, Oklahoma, and Kansas," which they maintained for nearly 150 years. Together with the Kiowa, Comanche, and Apache, they dominated western Oklahoma.

The Osage held high rank among the old hunting tribes of the Great Plains. From their traditional homes in the woodlands of present-day Missouri and Arkansas, the Osage would make semi-annual buffalo hunting forays into the Great Plains to the west. They also hunted deer, rabbit, and other wild game in the central and eastern parts of their domain. Near their villages, the women cultivated varieties of corn, squash, and other vegetables which they processed for food. They also harvested and processed nuts and wild berries. In their years of transition, the Osage had cultural practices that had elements of the cultures of both Woodland Native Americans and the Great Plains peoples. The villages of the Osage were important hubs in the Great Plains trading network served by Kaw people as intermediaries.

==== Traditional spirituality ====
Osage people who adhere to traditional customs believe they are an integral part of a broader universe. Their ceremonies and social organization represent what is observed around them that was created by a supreme life force known as Wah'Kon-Tah or Wakonda. Everything created has the spirit of Wakonda within it, from trees, plants, and the sky to animals and human beings. They believe there are two main divisions to life, consisting of the sky and earth. Life is created in the sky, and descends to the earth in material form. The sky is viewed as masculine in nature and the earth as feminine.

They revere the behavior of animals such as hawks, deer and bears, which are considered to be very courageous. Other species lived long lives, such as pelicans. Because humans lacked many of the characteristics naturally found within other forms of life around them, they were expected to learn from the others and emulate characteristics desirable for survival. Survival was not a competition between humans and non-humans, but rather a struggle between human communities.

Wakonda was viewed as "the mysterious life-force that pervades the sun", "moon", "earth", "and the stars", as well as the embodiment of order on Earth, which was seen as a place where chaos mostly won.

Efforts for survival were the responsibility of the people and not of Wakonda, although they might ask Wakonda for help. Considering life a struggle among human groups, they viewed warfare as necessary for self-preservation. The people's survival was dependent on their ability to defend themselves. Over time, the Osage developed clan and kinship systems that mirrored the cosmos as they saw it. Osage clans were typically named after elements of their world: animals, plants and weather phenomenon such as storms.

This was a symbolic representation. Each clan had its own responsibilities within the tribe. Names of clans included Red Cedar (Hon-tse-shu-tsy), Travelers in the Mist (Moh-sho-tsa-moie), Deer Lungs (Tah-lah-he) and Elk (O-pon). Children born to a certain clan had a ceremonial naming in order to introduce them to the community. Without a ceremonial name, an Osage child could not participate in ceremonies, so naming was an important part of Osage identity. The people regulated marriage through the clans: clan members had to marry people from opposite clans or divisions. Clan representation was expressed in the arrangement of Osage villages. The sky people lived on the side opposite the earth people, and the lodges of the Osage spiritual leaders were situated in between the two sides.

Osage life was highly ritualized, where there were certain ceremonies would be performed utilizing bundles, ceremonial pipes which used tobacco as offerings to seek Wakonda's aid. These ceremonies were presided over by Osage medicine people and spiritual leaders. Although some of the literature cites these individuals as "priests", this term is misleading and is more Eurocentric in nature. Ceremonies, although very elaborate served basic functions such as requesting aid from Wakonda for continued tribal existence and the blessing of a long life through children.

Ceremonial songs were also a way to document the knowledge spiritual leaders gained, considering there was no written language. Songs of this nature were taught and shared among only those other Osages who were sincere and had proven themselves. Many songs and ceremonies were created for all facets of life such as adoption, marriage, war, agriculture and to honor the rising of the sun in the morning.

During funerals, the faces of dead Osage were traditionally "painted to signal [his or] her tribe and clan".

=== Early French colonization ===
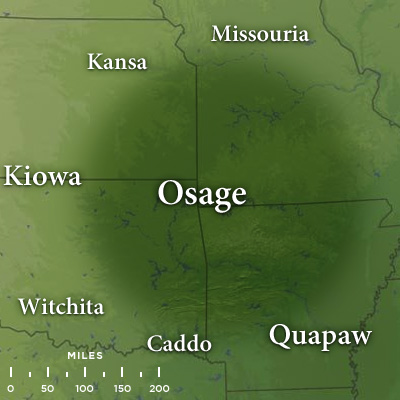
A map showing the sphere of influence of the late 17th-century Osage superimposed over the modern Midwestern United States

In 1673, French explorers Jacques Marquette and Louis Jolliet were among the first Europeans documented to contact the Osage, traveling southward from present-day Canada in their journey along the Mississippi River. Marquette's 1673 map noted the Kanza, Osage, and Pawnee tribes thrived in much of modern-day Kansas.

The Osage called the Europeans I'n-Shta-Heh (Heavy Eyebrows) because of their facial hair. As experienced warriors, the Osage allied with the French, with whom they traded, against the Illiniwek during the early 18th century. The first half of the 1720s was a time of more interaction between the Osage and French colonizers. Étienne de Veniard, Sieur de Bourgmont founded Fort Orleans in their territory; it was the first European colonial fort on the Missouri River. Jesuit missionaries were assigned to French forts and established missions in an attempt to convert the Osage, learning their language to ingratiate themselves. In 1724, the Osage allied with the French rather than the Spanish in their fight for control of the Mississippi region. In 1725, Bourgmont led a delegation of Osage and other tribal chiefs to Paris. They were shown around France, including a visit to Versailles, Château de Marly and Fontainebleau. They hunted with Louis XV in the royal forest and saw an opera.

During the French and Indian War (the North American front of the Seven Years' War), France was defeated by Great Britain and in 1763 ceded control over their lands east of the River Mississippi to the British Crown. The French Crown made a separate deal with Spain, which took nominal control of much of the Illinois Country west of the great river. By the late 18th century, the Osage did extensive business with the French Creole fur trader René Auguste Chouteau, who was based in St. Louis. St. Louis was part of territory under nominal Spanish control after the Seven Years' War, but was dominated by French colonists.

They were the de facto European power in St. Louis and other settlements along the Mississippi, building their wealth on the fur trade. In return for the Chouteau brothers' building a fort in the village of the Great Osage 350 miles (560 km) southwest of St. Louis, the Spanish regional government gave the Chouteaus a six-year monopoly on trade (1794–1802). The Chouteaus named the post Fort Carondelet after the Spanish governor. The Osage were pleased to have a fur trading post nearby, as it gave them access to manufactured goods and increased their prestige among the tribes.

=== U.S. interaction ===
Lewis and Clark reported in 1804 that the peoples were the Great Osage on the Osage River, the Little Osage upstream, and the Arkansas band on the Verdigris River, a tributary of the Arkansas River. The Osage then numbered some 5,500. The Osage and Quapaw suffered extensive losses from smallpox in 1801–1802. Historians estimate up to 2,000 Osage died in the epidemic.

In 1804, after the United States made the Louisiana Purchase, the U.S. government appointed the wealthy French fur trader Jean-Pierre Chouteau, a half-brother of René Auguste Chouteau, as the Indian agent assigned to the Osage. In 1809, he founded the Saint Louis Missouri Fur Company with his son Auguste Pierre Chouteau and other prominent men of St. Louis, most of whom were of French-Creole descent, born in North America. Having lived with the Osage for many years and learned their language, Jean-Pierre Chouteau traded with them and made his home at present-day Salina, Oklahoma, in the western part of their territory.

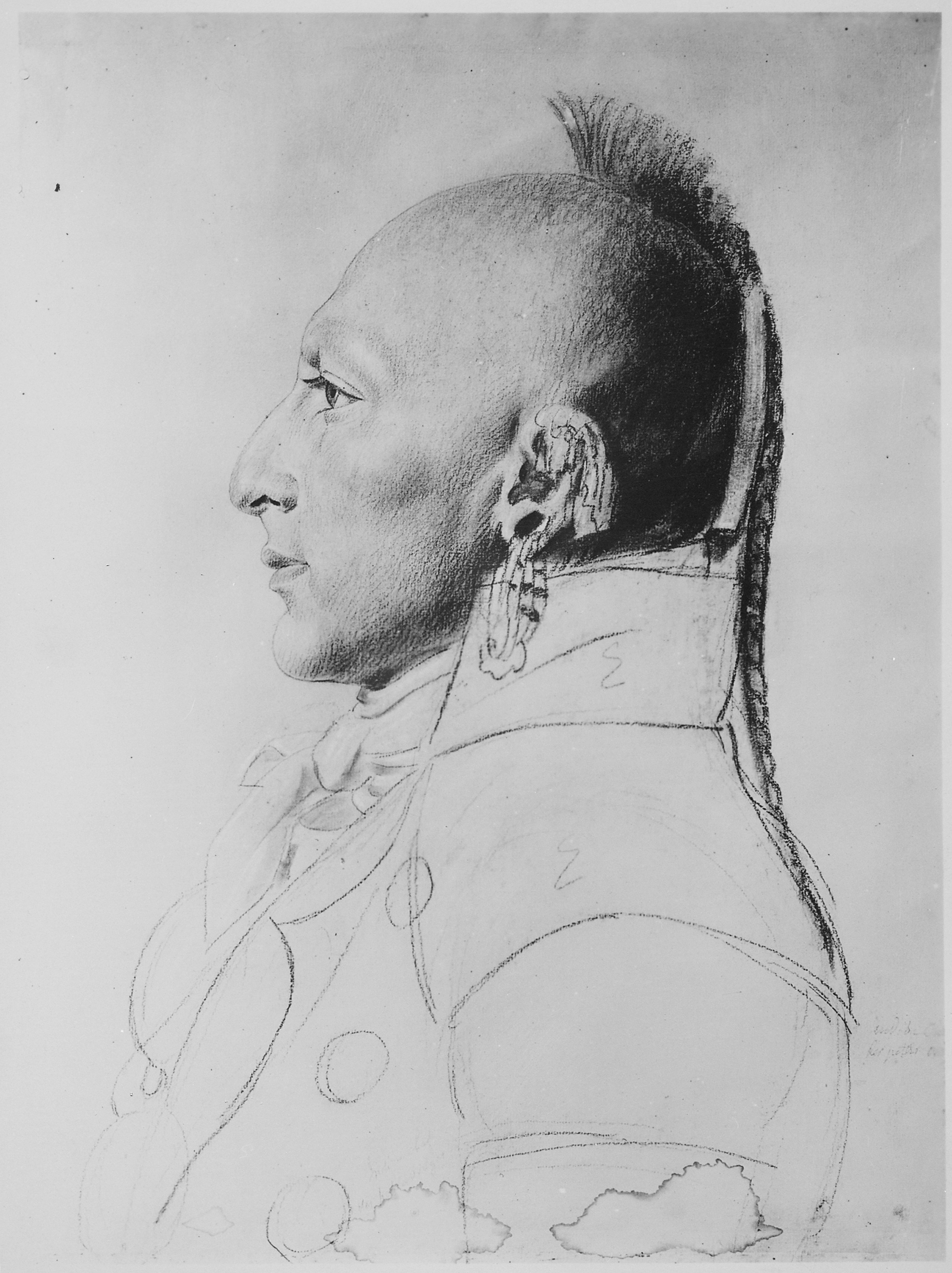
Chief of the Little Osage, c. 1807

After the Lewis and Clark Expedition was completed in 1806, Jefferson appointed Meriwether Lewis as Indian Agent for the Territory of Missouri and the region. There were continuing confrontations between the Osage and other tribes in this area. Lewis anticipated that the U.S. would have to go to war with the Osage, because of their raids on eastern Natives and European-American settlements. However, the U.S. lacked sufficient military strength to coerce Osage bands into ceasing their raids. It decided to supply other tribes with weapons and ammunition, provided they attack the Osage to the point they "cut them off completely or drive them from their country."

For instance, in September 1807, Lewis persuaded the Potawatomie, Sac, and Fox to attack an Osage village; three Osage warriors were killed. The Osage blamed the Americans for the attack. One of the Chouteau traders intervened and persuaded the Osage to conduct a buffalo hunt rather than seek retaliation by attacking Americans.

Lewis tried to control the Osage also by separating the friendly members from the hostile. In a letter dated August 21, 1808, that President Jefferson sent to Lewis, he says that he approves of the measures Lewis has taken in regards to making allies of the friendly Osage from those deemed as hostile. Jefferson writes, "we may go further, & as the principal obstacle to the Indians acting in large bodies is the want of provisions, we might supply that want, & ammunition also if they need it." But the goal foremost pursued by the U.S. was to push the Osage out of areas being settled by European Americans, who began to enter the Louisiana Territory after the U.S. acquired it.

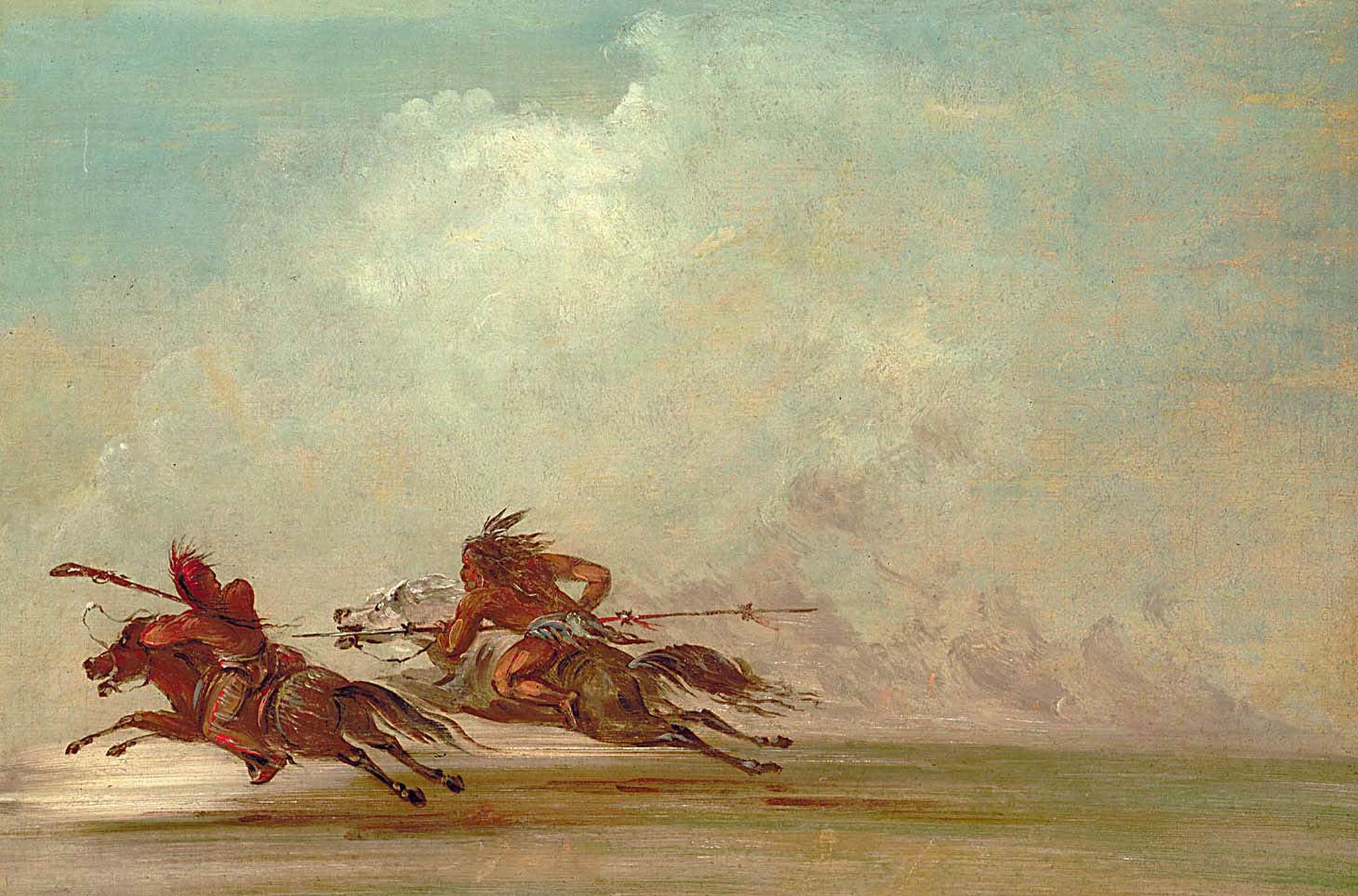
War on the plains. Comanche (right) trying to lance an Osage warrior. Painting by George Catlin, 1834

The lucrative fur trade continued to stimulate the growth of St. Louis and attracted more settlers there. It became a major port on the Mississippi River. The U.S. and Osage signed their first treaty on November 10, 1808, by which the Osage made a major cession of land in present-day Missouri. Under the Osage Treaty, they ceded 52,480,000 acres (212,400 km^{2}) to the federal government. With that the amount they were given for the reservation, (aprox 1,408,000 acres) they would have a net loss or total land loss of 51,072,000.

This treaty created a buffer line between the Osage and new European-American settlers in the Missouri Territory. It also established the requirement that the U.S. president had to approve all future land sales and cessions by the Osage. The Treaty of Ft. Osage states the U.S. would "protect" the Osage tribe "from the insults and injuries of other tribes of Indians, situated near the settlements of white people....". As was common in Native American relations with the federal government, the Osage found that the U.S. did not carry through on this commitment.

==== Wars with other tribes ====
The Choctaw chief Pushmataha, based in Mississippi, made his early reputation in battles against the Osage tribe in the area of southern Arkansas and their borderlands. In the early 19th century, some Cherokee, such as Sequoyah, moved from the southeast to the Arkansas River valley under pressure from European-American settlement in their traditional territory. They clashed there with the Osage, who controlled this area.

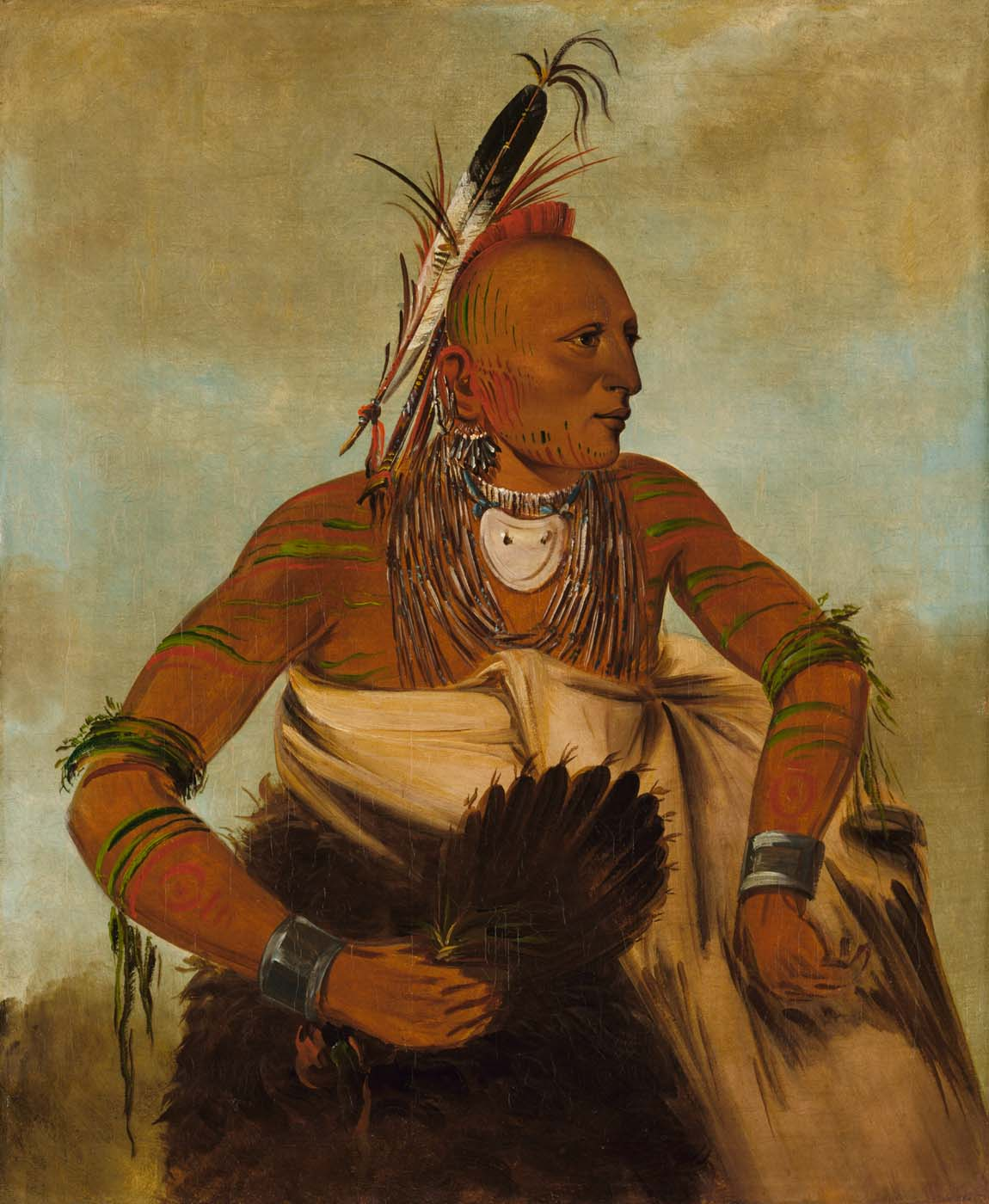
An Osage warrior painted by George Catlin, 1834

The Osage regarded the Cherokee as invaders. They began raiding Cherokee towns, stealing horses, carrying off captives (usually women and children), and killing others, trying to drive out the Cherokee with a campaign of violence and fear. The Cherokee were not effective in stopping the Osage raids and worked to gain support from related tribes as well as whites. The peoples confronted each other in the "Battle of Claremore Mound," in which 38 Osage warriors were killed and 104 were taken captive by the Cherokee and their allies.

As a result of the battle, the United States constructed Fort Smith in present-day Arkansas. It was intended to prevent armed confrontations between the Osage and other tribes. The U.S. compelled the Osage to cede additional land to the federal government in the treaty referred to as Lovely's Purchase.

In 1833, the Osage clashed with the Kiowa near the Wichita Mountains in modern-day south-central Oklahoma, in an incident known as the Cutthroat Gap massacre. The Osage cut off the heads of their victims and arranged them in rows of brass cooking buckets. No Osage died in this attack. Later, Kiowa warriors, allied with the Comanche, raided the Osage and others. In 1836, the Osage prohibited the Kickapoo from entering their Missouri reservation, pushing them back to ceded lands in Illinois.

==== Reservations and missionaries ====
Two major treaties with the United States were signed by the Osage: Treaty of St. Louis (1818) and Osage Treaty (1825). In these agreements, the Osage ceded their traditional lands across what are now the western portions of Missouri and Arkansas, plus nearly the entire states of Kansas and Oklahoma. In exchange, they were to receive cash and annuity payments, a reservation in what is now southern Kansas, and equipment to help them adapt to farming and a more settled culture.

They were first relocated to a reservation in what is now southeastern Kansas called the Osage Reservation. The city of Independence later developed there. The first Osage reservation was a 50-by-150-mile (80 by 241 km) strip, with the east–west dimension being the widest. The United Foreign Missionary Society sent clergy to them, supported by the Presbyterian, Dutch Reformed, and Associate Reformed churches. They established the Union, Harmony, Neosho, Boudinot, and three Hopefield missions. Cultural differences often led to conflicts, as the Protestants tried to impose their culture. The Catholic Church also sent missionaries. The Osage were attracted to their sense of mystery and ritual but felt the Catholics did not fully embrace the Osage sense of the spiritual incarnate in nature.

During this period in Kansas, the tribe suffered from the 1837 Great Plains smallpox epidemic, which caused devastating losses among Native Americans from Canada to New Mexico. All clergy except the Catholics abandoned the Osage during the crisis. Most survivors of the epidemic had received vaccinations against the disease. The Osage believed that the loyalty of Catholic priests, who not only stayed with them but also died in the epidemic, created a special covenant between the tribe and the Catholic Church, but they did not convert in great numbers. Catholic clergy accompanied the Osage when they were forced to move again to Indian Territory in what became Oklahoma.

Honoring this special relationship, as well as Catholic sisters who taught their children in schools on reservations, numerous Osage elders went to the city of St. Louis in 2014 to celebrate its 250th anniversary of founding by the French. They participated in a mass partially conducted in Osage at St. Francis Xavier College Church of St. Louis University on April 2, 2014, as part of planned activities. One of the con-celebrants was Todd Nance, who is the first Osage to be ordained as a Catholic priest.

In 1843, the Osage asked the federal government to send "Black Robes", Jesuit missionaries, to their reservation to educate their children; the Osage considered the Jesuits better able to work with their culture than the Protestant missionaries. The Jesuits also established a girls' school operated by the Sisters of Loretto from Kentucky, led by Mother Bridget Hayden.

During a 35-year period, most of the missionaries were new recruits from Europe: Ireland, Italy, the Netherlands, and Belgium. They taught, established more than 100 mission stations, built churches, and created the longest-running school system in Kansas.

=== Civil War and Indian wars ===
White squatters continued to be a frequent problem for the Osage, but they recovered from population losses, regaining a total of 5,000 citizens by 1850. The Kansas–Nebraska Act resulted in numerous settlers arriving in Kansas Territory; both abolitionists and pro-slavery groups were represented among those trying to establish residency in order to vote on whether the territory should permit slavery. The Osage lands became overrun with European-American settlers. In 1855, the Osage suffered another epidemic of smallpox, because a generation had grown up without getting vaccinated.

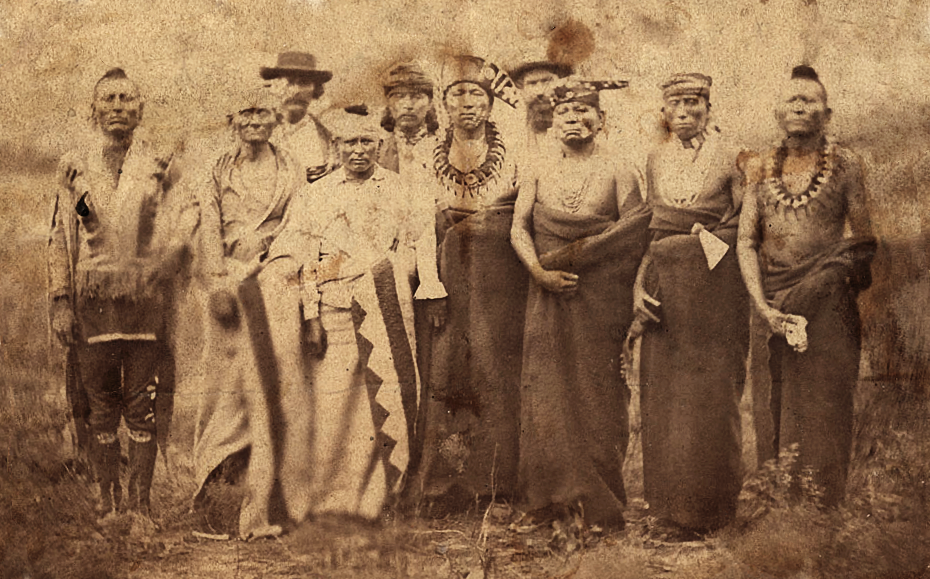
Osage Attendees at the Fort Smith conference in 1865, including Big Hill Joe (center) wearing a bear claw necklace and Black Dog II, far left.

During Bleeding Kansas and later the American Civil War the Osage largely stayed neutral, but both sides successfully recruited Osage fighters to their side. John Allen Mathews, an American who married an Osage woman, advocated for the tribe to side with the Confederate States of America. The tribe signed a treaty with the CSA in October 1861. The Jesuit priest Father Schoenmakers recruited Osage fighters for the Union Army.

They struggled simply to survive through famine and the war. During the war, many Caddoan and Creek refugees from Indian Territory came to Osage country in Kansas, further straining their resources. Although the Osage favored the Union by a five to one ratio, they made a treaty with the Confederacy to try to buy some peace. Roughly 200 Osage men were recruited into the Confederate army and formed the Osage Battalion, serving under Cherokee Confederate General Stand Watie.

The Confederacy had considerable difficulty obtaining any significant support from the Indians in Kansas and basically gave up after several attempts at recruitment.

Fearing more bloodshed with the Plains Indians, delegates from the Osage Nation signed the Camp Napoleon Council accord in May 1865 at Verden, Oklahoma, including Wahtahshimgah, Clairmore, NinchamKah, Wahshashewah tah ingah, Kahnak Kihingah, and Black Dog. It had little effect with the U.S., as they ignored this treaty.

After the war, the United States immediately began re-writing treaties with Indian tribes, as many had supported the Confederacy. The Osage were a part of the Fort Smith Council in September 1865, which culminated in a treaty signed on the 29th at Canville Trading Post (part of the Osage lands in Kansas on the Neosho River), ratified by the U.S. on June 26, 1866, and published on January 21, 1867. Article I established the Osage Diminished Reserve of 30 by 50 miles (48 by 80 km), with the widest portion being north-south. Article II ceded a strip of land 20 miles north-to-south and extending approximately 150 miles east-west. The ceded land was to be sold by the U.S. Land Office at $1.25 per acre. Signatories included:

- Principal Chief of the Osage Nation, White Hair VI
- Chief of the Big Hill, Ta-wah-she-he,
- Chief of the Little Osages, Me-tso-shin-ca Little Bear
- Chief of the Clermont Band, Clermont
- Chief of the Black Dog Band, Black Dog II

The ceded land became quickly inundated with settlers to Kansas as southern Kansas became the latest frontier. The Chisholm Trail saw its first use in 1867, a highway for cowboys driving Texas longhorns that would pass through the old Osage Reservation.

In 1867, Lt. Col. George Armstrong Custer chose Osage scouts in his campaign against Chief Black Kettle and his band of Cheyenne and Arapaho Indians in western Indian Territory. He knew the Osage for their scouting expertise, excellent terrain knowledge, and military prowess. Custer and his soldiers took Chief Black Kettle and his peaceful band by surprise in the early morning near the Washita River on November 27, 1868. They killed Chief Black Kettle, and the ambush resulted in additional deaths on both sides. This incident became known as the Battle of Washita River, or the Washita massacre, an ignominious part of the United States' Indian Wars.

The Sturges Osage Treaty was negotiated in 1868 by William Sturges, president of the Leavenworth, Lawrence, & Galveston Railroad Company. Its terms were not acceptable to the Osage; they sent lawyers to lobby against it in Washington. It was never ratified by Congress. By this time there were three Osage bands left: the Little Osage, the Hominy, and the Big Hill. Of the negotiations, Chief of the Big Hill Ne-Kah-Wah-She-Tun-Kah would later report that the Osage were under the impression that the entire Cherokee lands south of the Osage, a 50-mile northern strip of what is now Oklahoma, would form their new negotiated reserve except for lands east of the Arkansas River that would continue to be Cherokee. This would not be the case, as the 1868 treaty was not ratified, and the offerings changed to a much smaller land. The Sturges Osage Treaty was primarily disliked because of the much lower price for land.

The Sturges Osage Treaty became a contentious issue decades later in a dispute over legal representation. Representatives of the estates for two lawyers sued the Osages for $183,000 in 1906 for services rendered in 1868-1869 defending the Osages and defeating the treaty.

Congress passed a new resolution to be known as the Drum Creek Treaty on July 15, 1870. The terms of this revised treaty were not entirely popular with the Osage, but it was an inevitable end to the conflict with white Americans, and it would provide better compensation than the 1868 treaty. During negotiations, an Osage chief, suspicious of the intentions of the American delegation, spoke against the signing of the treaty that would send thousands of them to a reservation:

I remember one Indian orator [...] got up and spoke of Treaties they had with the Great Father in Washington, in the past, and how they once owned all the land north of the Red River of the South, and west of the Mississippi, and south of the Missouri River, and, to prove that, he brought out a tin cylinder a finely engrossed Treaty, signed by President Thomas Jefferson in 1804.^{[Note]}

[...]

He then said they had lost all that land, and now they came down to take away the last land they had.

^{Note} This was referring to the Treaty of Fort Clark of 1808, but since the signed document was from 1804, it was from the time in which Lewis and Clark brought Osage chiefs to meet President Jefferson, the legendary Great Father. Commissioners determined that the elaborate "treaty" was signed by the Secretary of War in 1804, Henry Dearborn.

Chief Joseph Pawnee-no-pashe, a well-respected and educated Osage chief, led the delegation amidst a crowd of approximately "four or five thousand Indians" camping in their "wigwams." Chief Joseph demanded the right to hunt buffalo outside the borders of the new reservation and they be given the right to setup their own laws of trespass. He also wanted tribal ownership instead of individual land ownership, a prescient decision which other Indian nations did not acquire.

Chief Joseph addressed the Indian Commissioners and agent Isaac T. Gibson and wished it be transcribed and sent to Washington:

Since the Treaty of 1804 the Osages have been in peace with the white man. Every time the President has wanted it we have sold him our homes. [...] And what have I to show for it? Not one cent. The land that we have given to our Great Father is still there, but what we have received is all gone. My chiefs are all dead. They died without any money – died naked. I have never received anything from them for what they have taken from me. The white man has taken our timber and land. He might just as well have taken the money out of my hand.[...] We could not until now come to one mind, We are well pleased with the price. My people have confidence in your commissioners. One of you have promised to see the Great Father, and we hope you will. [...] We leave our lands in trust with the United States, and all lands not sold in ten years we will claim.

The treaty was ratified by the Osage at a meeting in Montgomery County, Kansas, on September 10, 1870. The meeting was attended by Chicago dry goods merchant John V. Farwell and his 11-year-old son, John V. Farwell, Jr., a Quaker missionary named John D. Lang, and the Quaker artist Vincent Colyer.

Indians signing the treaty included the chiefs George Beaver, Che-she-wah-ton-kah, Black Dog II, Hard Rope, Ne-kah-wah-she-tun-kah, and his brother Joseph Pawnee-no-pashe, "Governor Joe." White Hair VI, the former principal chief of the Osage, had died the previous year, leaving Governor Joe as the highest-ranking Osage Indian present.

The treaty provided that the remainder of Osage land in Kansas be sold, and the proceeds used to relocate the tribe to Indian Territory in the Cherokee Outlet. By delaying agreement with removal, the Osage benefited by a change in administration. They sold their lands to the "peace" administration of President Ulysses S. Grant, for which they received more money: $1.25 an acre rather than the 19 cents previously offered to them by the U.S. The Osage reported 3,500 people in their nation at the time.

In 1874, a party of self-appointed militiamen encountered a small band of Osage on a hunting party. They began to disarm some of the men, but several escaped and were shot. The remainder fled to the Indian reservation and reported the incident. When the militia reported the event and put the blame on the Osage, the governor of Kansas Thomas A. Osborn declared war and asked the U.S. government for aid and weapons.

Chief Joseph Pawnee-no-pashe and fellow Osage leader Chief Hard Rope wrote to Superintendent Enoch Hoag about the evidence of the attack: the Osage had been attacked by the roaming posse of Kansans from Medicine Lodge, Kansas. The 29 men, women, and children had been hunting buffalo in southern Kansas. The skirmish killed five of them, all because rumors and famine had driven the men of Kansas to imagine an Indian uprising.

Although the "border war" had been a complete fabrication by Kansans who wanted to get free rations from the government for Indian patrols, the ploy worked. From 1875 onward, the Osage remained on their reservation and did not go on hunting parties. The buffalo was essentially extinct anyway, with hide shipments in nearby Dodge City crashing from 1873 to 1874. It would not be long until the U.S. began to ignore the sovereignty of the Osage Nation and demanded the allocation of land to tribe members.

=== Removal to Indian territory ===
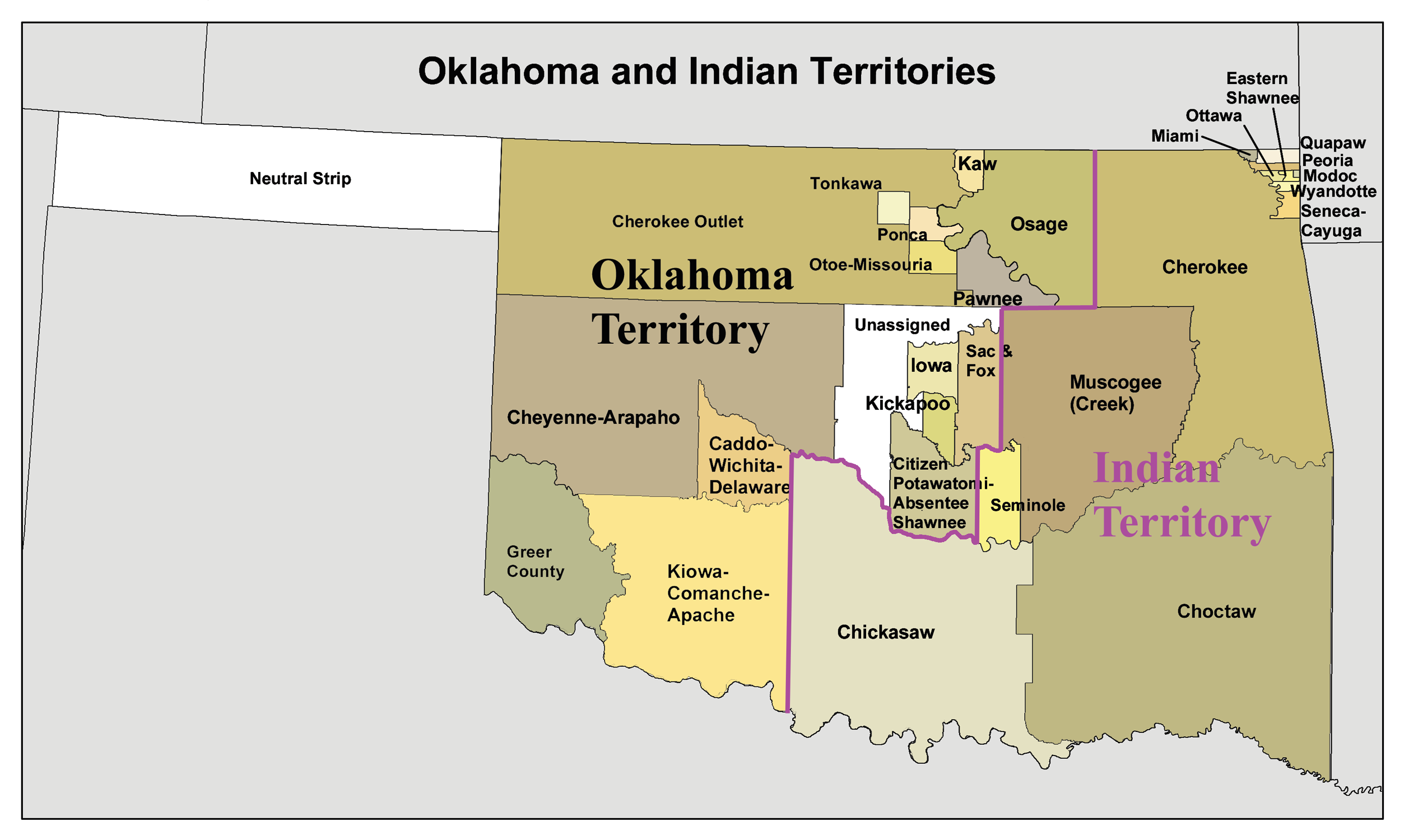
A map of the Oklahoma and Indian territories, circa 1890s, created using Census Bureau data

The Osage were one of the few American Indian nations to buy their own reservation. As a result, they retained more rights to the land and sovereignty. They retained mineral rights on their lands. The reservation, of approximately 1,470,000 acres (5,900 km^{2}), was purchased in 1872 and is coterminous with present-day Osage County, Oklahoma, in the north-central portion of the state between Tulsa and Ponca City.

The Osage established four towns: Pawhuska, Hominy, Fairfax, and Gray Horse. Each was dominated by one of the major bands at the time of removal. The Osage continued their relationship with the Catholic Church, which established schools operated by two orders of nuns, as well as mission churches.

It was many years before the Osage recovered from the hardships suffered during their last years in Kansas and their early years on the reservation in Indian Territory. For nearly five years during the depression of the 1870s, the Osage did not receive their full annuity in cash. Like other Native Americans, they suffered from the government's failure to provide full or satisfactory rations and goods as part of their annuities during this period. Middlemen made profits by shorting supplies to the Indians or giving them poor-quality food. Some people starved. Many adjustments had to be made to their new way of life.

During this time, Indian Office reports showed nearly a 50 percent decline in the Osage population. This resulted from the failure of the U.S. government to provide adequate medical supplies, food and clothing. The people suffered greatly during the winters. While the government failed to supply them, outlaws often smuggled whiskey to the Osage and the Pawnee.

In 1879, an Osage delegation went to Washington, D.C., and gained agreement to have all their annuities paid in cash; they hoped to avoid being continually shortchanged in supplies, or by being given supplies of inferior quality - spoiled food and inappropriate goods. They were the first Native American nation to gain full cash payment of annuities. They gradually began to build up their tribe again but suffered encroachment by white outlaws, vagabonds, and thieves.

The Osage wrote a constitution in 1881, modeling some parts of it after the United States Constitution. By the start of the 20th century, the federal government and progressives were continuing to press for Native American assimilation, believing this was the best policy for them. Congress passed the Curtis Act and Dawes Act, legislation requiring the dismantling of communal lands on other reservations. They allotted communal lands in 160-acre (65 ha) portions to individual households, declaring the remainder as "surplus" and selling it to non-natives. They also dismantled the tribal governments.

=== Oil discovery ===
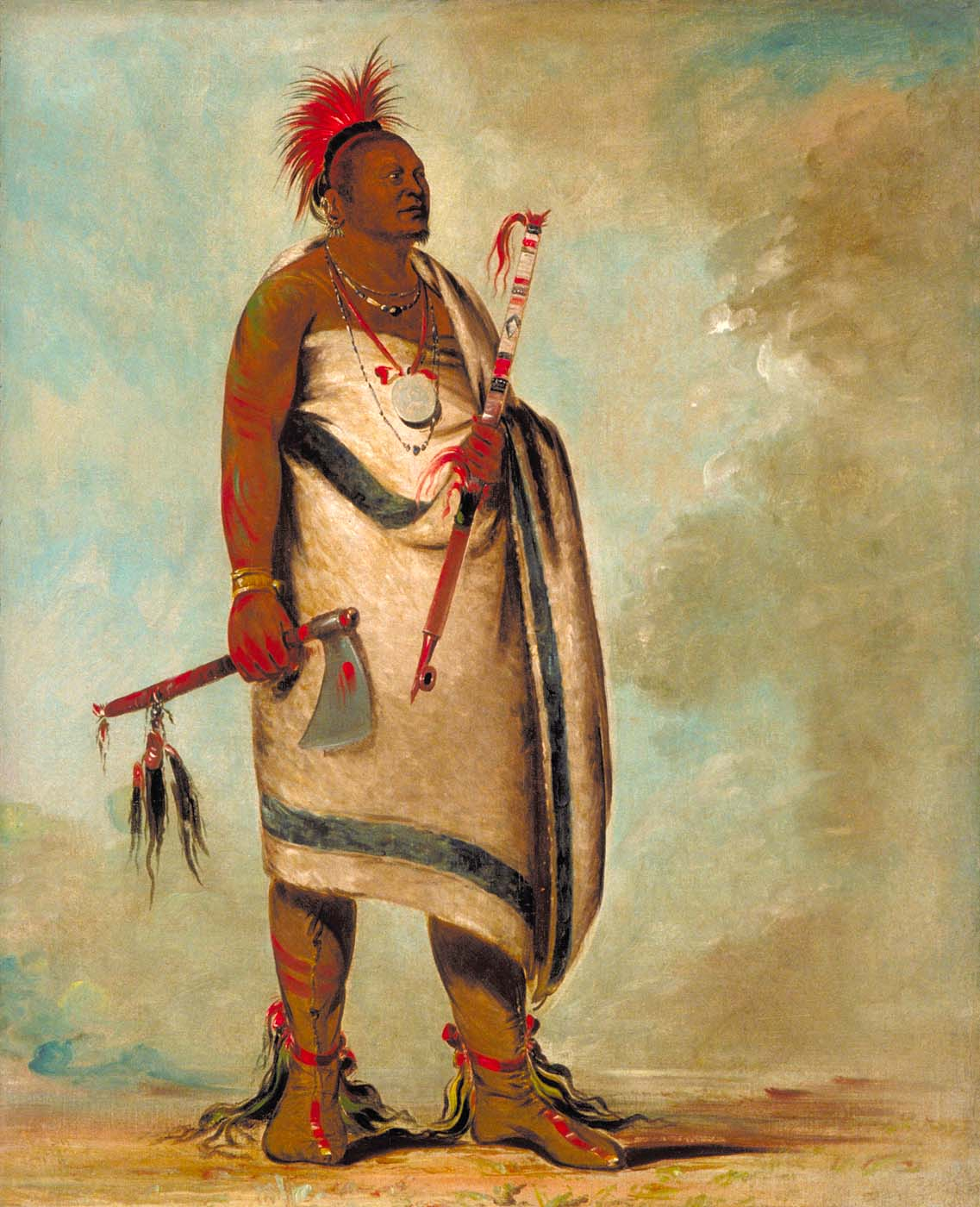
Shonka Sabe (Black Dog). Chief of the Hunkah division of the Osage tribe. Painted in 1834 by George Catlin

In 1894 large quantities of oil were discovered beneath the vast prairie owned by the tribe. Because of his recent work in developing oil production in Kansas, Henry Foster approached the Bureau of Indian Affairs (BIA) to request exclusive privileges to explore the Osage Reservation for oil and natural gas. Foster died shortly afterward, and his brother, Edwin B. Foster, assumed his interests.

The BIA granted the request on March 16, 1896, with the stipulation that Foster was to pay the Osage tribe a 10% royalty on all sales of petroleum produced on the reservation. Foster found large quantities of oil, and the Osage benefited greatly monetarily. But this discovery of "black gold" eventually led to more hardships for tribal citizens.

The Osage had learned about negotiating with the U.S. government. Through the efforts of Principal Chief James Bigheart, in 1907 they reached a deal which enabled them to retain communal mineral rights on the reservation lands. These were later found to have large quantities of crude oil, and tribal citizens benefited from royalty revenues from oil development and production. The government leased lands on their behalf for oil development; the companies/government sent the Osage citizens royalties that, by the 1920s, had dramatically increased their wealth. In 1923 alone, the Osage earned $30 million in royalties. Since the early 20th century, they are the only tribe within the state of Oklahoma to retain a federally recognized reservation.

In 2000, the Osage sued the federal government over its management of the trust assets, alleging that it had failed to pay tribal citizens appropriate royalties, and had not historically protected the land assets and appreciation. The suit was settled in 2011 for $380 million, and a commitment by the government to make numerous changes to improve the program. In 2016, the Osage nation bought Ted Turner's 43,000-acre (17,000 ha) Bluestem ranch.

=== Osage Allotment Act ===
In 1898, the U.S. federal government claimed to no longer recognize the legitimacy of a governing Osage National Council which the people had created in 1881, with a constitution that adopted some aspects of that of the United States. In 1906, as part of the Osage Allotment Act, the U.S. Congress created the Osage Tribal Council to handle affairs of the tribe. It extinguished the power of tribal governments to enable the admission of the Indian Territory as part of the state of Oklahoma in 1907.

As the Osage owned their land, they were in a stronger position than other tribes. The Osage were unyielding in refusing to give up their lands and held up statehood for Oklahoma before signing an allotment act. They were forced to accept allotment but retained their "surplus" land after allotment to households, and apportioned it to individual citizens. Each of the 2,228 enrolled Osage citizens in 1906, and one non-Osage, received 657 acres (266 ha), nearly four times the amount of land, usually 160 acres (65 ha), that most Native American households were allotted in other places when communal lands were distributed. The tribe retained communal mineral rights to what was below the surface. As development of resources took place, citizens of the tribe received royalties according to their Osage headrights, paid according to the amount of land they held.

Although the Osage were encouraged to become settled farmers, their land was the poorest in the Indian Territory for agricultural purposes. They survived by subsistence farming, later enhanced by raising stock. They leased lands to ranchers for grazing and earned income from the resulting fees. In addition to breaking up communal land, the act replaced tribal government with the Osage National Council, to which members were to be elected to conduct the tribe's political, business, and social affairs.

Under the act, initially each Osage male had equal voting rights to elect members of the council, and the principal and assistant principal chiefs. The rights to these lands in future generations were divided among legal heirs, as were the mineral headrights to mineral lease royalties. Under the Allotment Act, only allottees and their descendants who held headrights could vote in the elections or run for office (originally restricted to males). The members voted by their headrights, which generated inequalities among the voters.

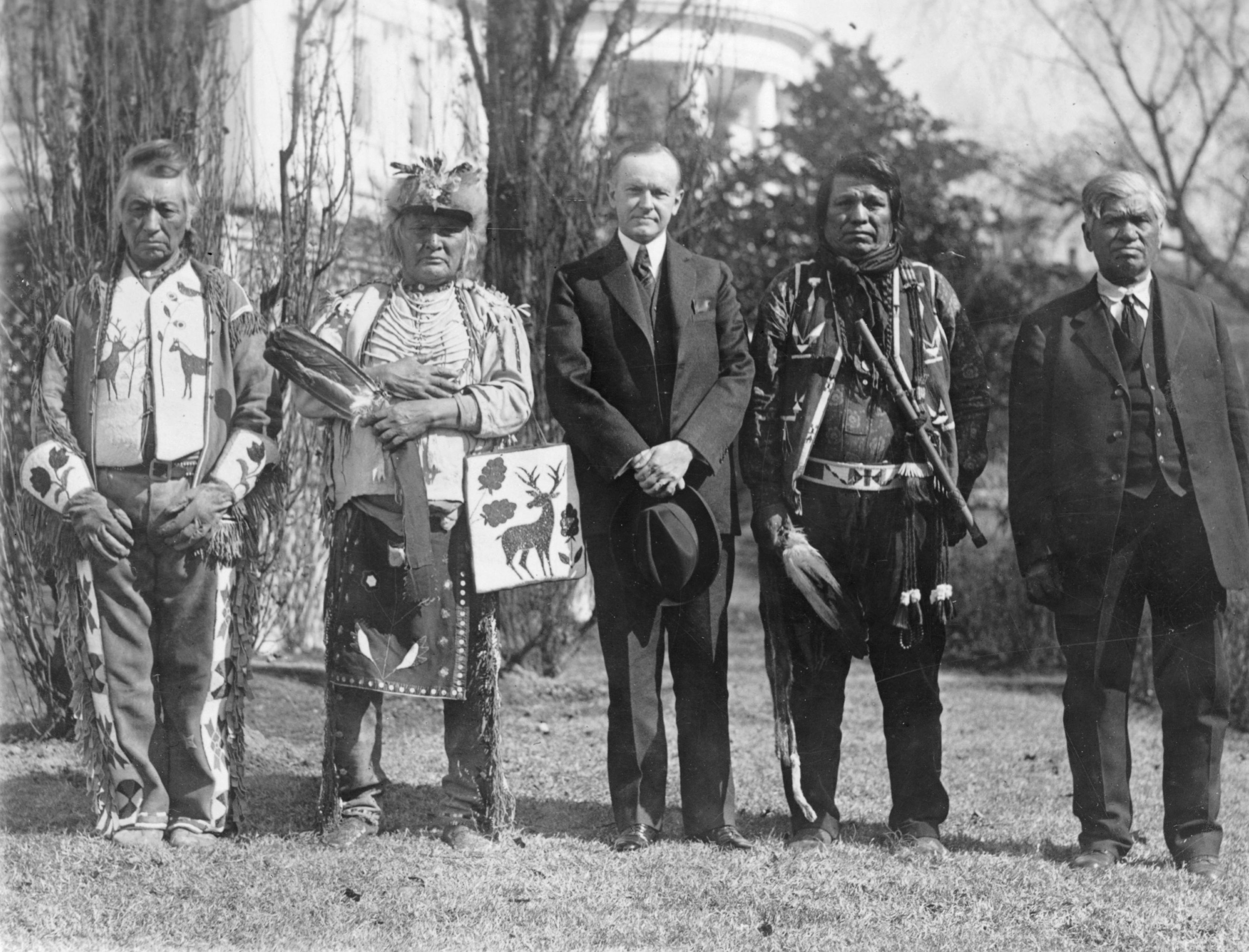
Four Osage men with U.S. president Calvin Coolidge after signing the Indian Citizenship Act of 1924, which granted Indians across the country full citizenship for the first time. By then two thirds were already citizens.

A 1992 U.S. district court decision ruled that the Osage could vote to reinstate the Osage National Council as city members of the Osage nation, rather than being required to vote by headright. This decision was reversed in 1997 with the United States Court of Appeals ruling that ended the government restoration. In 2004, Congress passed legislation to restore sovereignty to the Osage Nation and enable them to make their own decisions about government and enrollment criteria for their people.

In March 2010, the United States Court of Appeals for the Tenth Circuit held that the 1906 Allotment Act had disestablished the Osage reservation established in 1872. This ruling potentially affected the legal status of three of the seven Osage casinos, including the largest one in Tulsa, as it meant the casino was not on federal trust land. Federal Indian gaming law allows tribes to operate casinos only on trust land.

The Osage Nation's largest economic enterprise, Osage Casinos, officially opened newly constructed casinos, hotels and convenience stores in Skiatook and Ponca City in December 2013.

=== Natural resources and headrights ===
Before having a vote within the tribe on the question of allotment, the Osage demanded that the government purge their tribal rolls of people who were not legally Osage. The Indian agent had been adding names of persons who were not approved by the tribe, and the Osage submitted a list of more than 400 persons to be investigated. Because the government removed few of the fraudulent people, the Osage had to share their land and oil rights with people who did not belong. The Osage had negotiated keeping communal control of the mineral rights.

The act stated that all persons listed on tribal rolls prior to January 1, 1906 or born before July 1907 (allottees) would be allocated a share of the reservation's subsurface natural resources, regardless of blood quantum. The Osage headright could be inherited by legal heirs. This communal claim to mineral resources was due to expire in 1926. After that, individual landowners would control the mineral rights to their plots. This provision heightened the pressure for those whites who were eager to gain control of Osage lands before the deadline.

Although the Osage Allotment Act protected the tribe's mineral rights for two decades, any adult "of a sound mind" could sell surface land. Between 1907 and 1923, Osage individuals sold or leased thousands of acres to non-Indians of formerly restricted land. At the time, many Osage did not understand the value of such contracts and often were taken advantage of by unscrupulous businessmen, con artists, and others trying to grab part of their wealth. Non-Native Americans also tried to cash in on the new Osage wealth by marrying into families with headrights.

=== Osage Indian murders ===
In 1921, the U.S. Congress passed a law requiring any Osage of half or more Indian ancestry to be appointed a guardian until proving "competency". Minors with less than half Osage ancestry were required to have guardians appointed, even if their parents were living. This system was not administered by federal courts. Local courts appointed guardians from among white attorneys and businessmen. By law, the guardians provided a $4,000 annual allowance to their charges, but initially the government required little record keeping of how they invested the difference. Royalties to persons holding Osage headrights were much higher: $11,000–12,000 per year during the period 1922–1925. Guardians were permitted to collect $200–1,000 per year, and the attorney involved could collect $200 per year, which was withdrawn from each Osage's income. Some attorneys served as guardians and did so for four Osage at once, allowing them to collect $4,800 per year.

The tribe auctioned off development rights of their mineral assets for millions of dollars. According to the Commissioner of Indian Affairs, in 1924 the total revenue of the Osage from the mineral leases was $24,670,483. After the tribe auctioned mineral leases and more land was explored, the oil business on the Osage reservation boomed. Tens of thousands of oil workers arrived, more than 30 boom towns sprang up and, nearly overnight, Osage headright holders became the "richest people in the world." When royalties peaked in 1925, annual headright earnings were $13,000. A family of four who were all on the allotment roll earned $52,800, roughly equivalent to $969,336 in 2025.

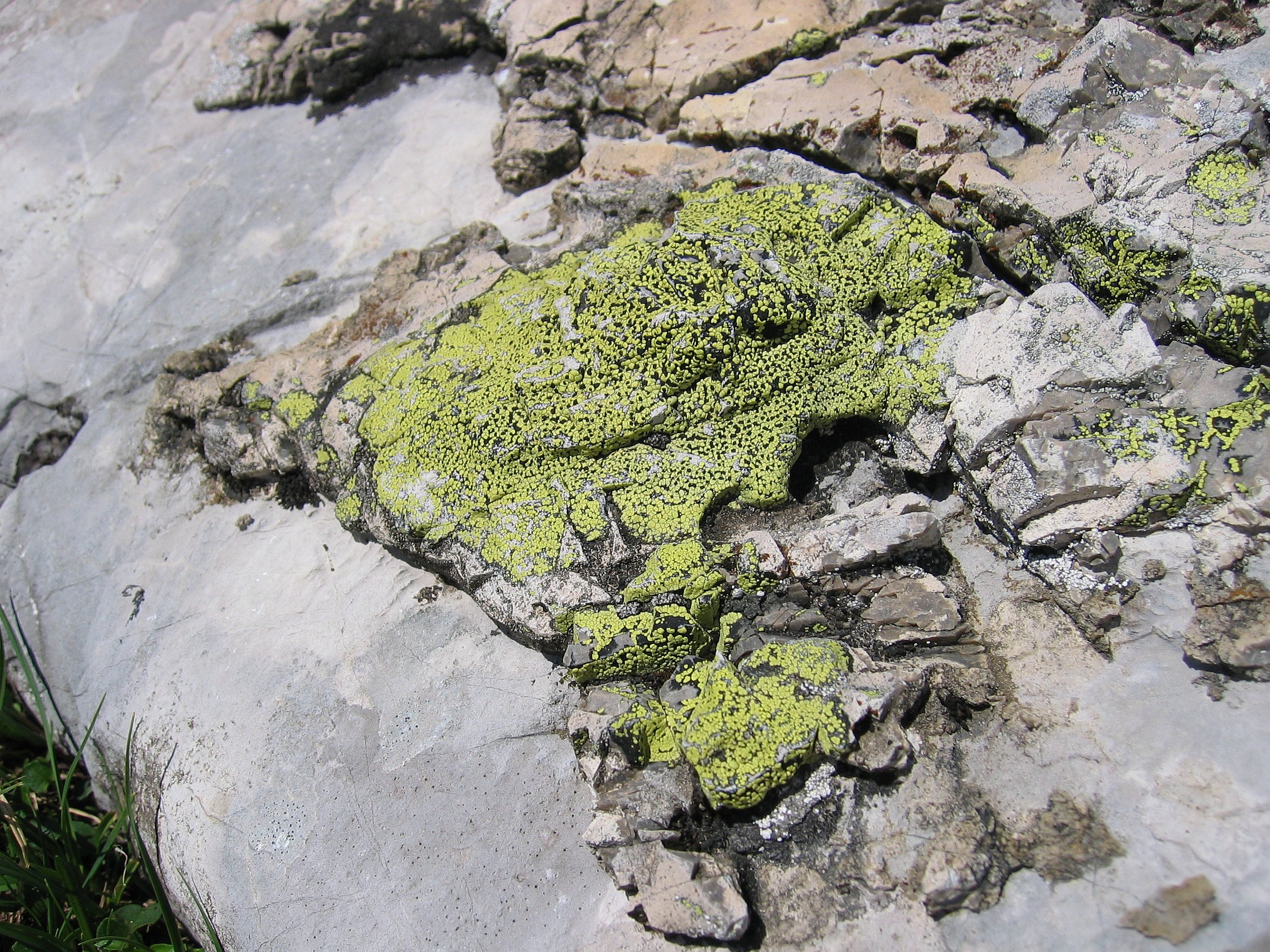
Limestone, a mineral resource for the Osage Nation

The guardianship program created an incentive for corruption, and many Osage were legally deprived of their land, headrights, and/or royalties. Others were murdered, in cases the police generally failed to investigate. The coroner's office colluded by falsifying death certificates, for instance claiming suicides when people had been poisoned. The Osage Allotment Act did not entitle the Native Americans to autopsies, so many deaths went unexamined.

In the early 1920s there was a rise in murders and suspicious deaths of Osage, called the "Reign of Terror." In one plot, in 1921, Ernest Burkhart, a European American, married Mollie Kyle, an Osage woman with headrights. His uncle William "King of Osage Hills" Hale, a powerful business man who led the plot, and brother Byron hired accomplices to murder Kyle family heirs. They arranged for the murders of Kyle's mother, two sisters, a brother-in-law, and a cousin, in cases involving poisoning, bombing, and shooting.

With local and state officials unsuccessful at solving the murders, in 1925 the Osage requested the help of the Federal Bureau of Investigation. It was the bureau's first murder case. By the time it started investigating, Kyle was already being poisoned. This was discovered, and she survived. She had inherited the headrights of the rest of her family. The FBI achieved the prosecution and conviction of the principals in the Kyle family murders. From 1921 to 1925, however, an estimated 60 Osage were killed, and most murders were not solved. John Joseph Mathews, an Osage, explored the disruptive social consequences of the oil boom for the Osage Nation in his semi-autobiographical novel Sundown (1934). Killers of the Flower Moon: The Osage Murders and the Birth of the FBI (2017) by David Grann was a National Book Award finalist; a related major motion picture was released in October 2023.

=== Changes to law and management claims ===
As a result of the murders and increasing problems with trying to protect Osage oil wealth, in 1925 Congress passed legislation limiting inheritance of Osage headrights only to those heirs of half or more Osage ancestry. They extended the tribal control of mineral rights for another 20 years. Later legislation gave the tribe communal control indefinitely. Today, headrights have been passed down primarily among descendants of the Osage who originally possessed them. The Bureau of Indian Affairs has estimated that 25% of headrights are owned by non-Osage people, including other American Indians, non-Indians, churches, and community organizations. It continues to pay royalties on mineral revenues on a quarterly basis.

Beginning in 1999, the Osage Nation sued the United States in the Court of Federal Claims (dockets 99-550 and 00-169) for mismanaging its trust funds and its mineral estate. The litigation eventually included claims reaching into the 19th century. In February 2011, the Court of Federal Claims awarded $330.7 million in damages in partial compensation for some of the mismanagement claims, covering the period from 1972 to 2000. On October 14, 2011, the United States settled the outstanding litigation for a total of $380 million. The tribe had about 16,000 citizens. The settlement includes commitments by the United States to cooperate with the Osage to institute new procedures to protect tribal trust funds and resource management.

== Demographics ==
In 2022, the Osage Nation Congress enacted a law that stated that the Osage Nation has to conduct a census every five years. The 2023 census was the first census completed, a historic accomplishment of the Osage Nation.

The Osage Nation has over 25,000 citizens today, 4,467 of whom live on the Osage Nation Reservation. The inaugural census, gathered responses from 3,922 tribal citizens. While 1,925 respondents (49%) resided in Oklahoma, there are citizens of the Osage Nation living in every U.S. state, as well as at least 11 other countries. 61% of respondents identified as female, 38.7% as male, and 0.4% as another gender. 55.4% were married. 52% reported being employed full-time, with the most prominent areas of work being healthcare, education, and local, tribal, or federal government. 25.5% reported at least some level of speaking proficiency in the Osage language. One in three members are children.

Osage Nation Reservation land is an area of approximately 1,470,559 acres (5,951.14 km^{2}).

== Government ==
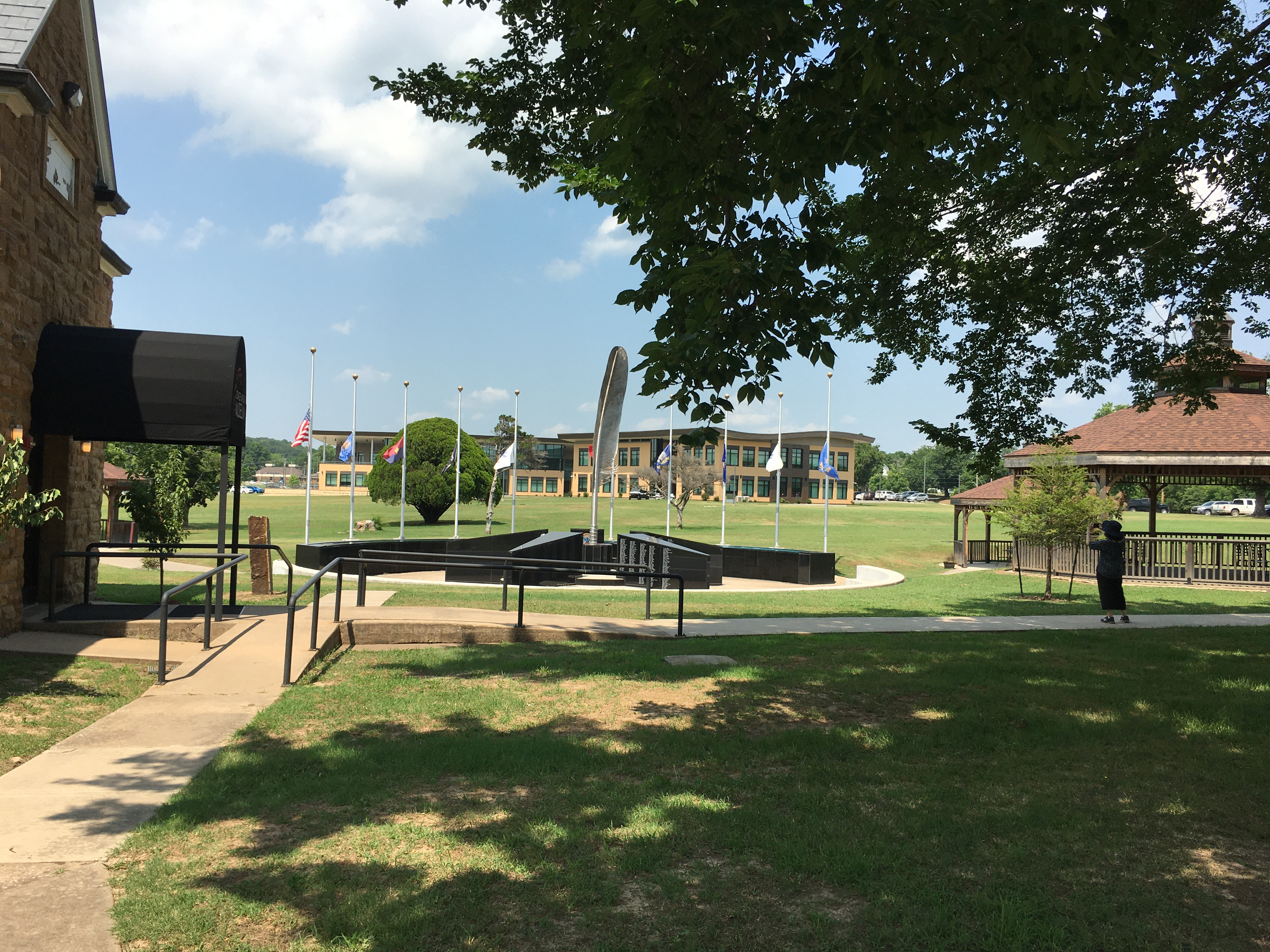
The Osage Nation Campus in Pawhuska. Seen are the Osage Nation Museum (left), the Osage Veterans Memorial with the feather sculpture (center), and the Osage Nation law and government services buildings in the background.

By a new constitution of 1994, the Osage voted that original allottees and their direct descendants, regardless of blood quantum, were citizens of the Osage Nation. This constitution was overruled through court judgments. The Osage appealed to Congress for support to create their own government and citizenship criteria rules. In 2004, President George W. Bush signed Public Law 108–431, "An Act to Reaffirm the Inherent Sovereign Rights of the Osage Tribe to Determine Its Membership and Form a Government." From 2004 to 2006, the Osage Government Reform Commission formed and worked to develop a new government. It explored how "sharply differing visions arose of the new government's goals, the nation's own history, and what it means to be Osage. The primary debates were focused on biology, culture, natural resources, and sovereignty."

The Reform Commission held weekly meetings to develop a referendum that Osage citizens could vote in for the purpose of developing and reshaping the Osage Nation government and its policies. On March 11, 2006, the people ratified the constitution in a second referendum vote. Its major provision was to provide "one man, one vote" to each citizen of the nation. Previously, based on the allotment process, persons voted proportionally as shareholders. By a 2/3 majority vote, the Osage Nation adopted the new constitutional form of government. It also ratified the definition of citizenship in the nation.

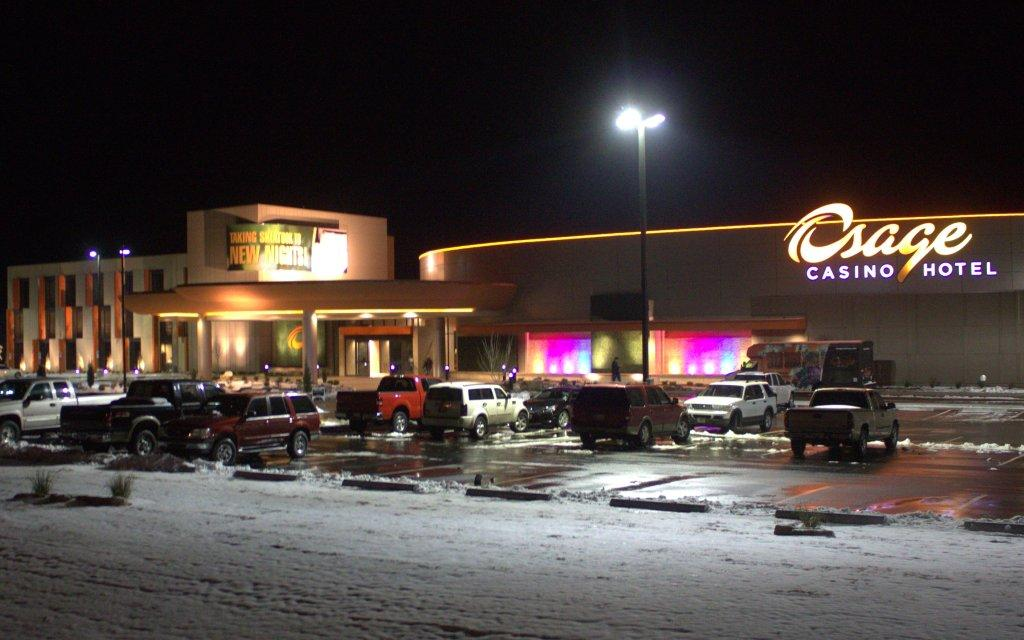
The Osage Casino Hotel in Skiatook

Today, the Osage Nation has 13,307 enrolled tribal citizens, with 6,747 living within the state of Oklahoma. Since 2006, it has defined enrollment based on a person's lineal descent from a citizen listed on the Osage rolls at the time of the Osage Allotment Act of 1906. A minimum blood quantum is not required. But, as the Bureau of Indian Affairs restricts federal education scholarships to persons who have 25% or more blood quantum in one tribe, the Osage Nation tries to support higher education for its students who do not meet that requirement.

The tribal government is headquartered in Pawhuska, Oklahoma, and has jurisdiction in Osage County, Oklahoma. The current governing body of the Osage nation contains three separate branches: an executive, a judicial and a legislative. These three branches parallel the United States government in many ways. The tribe operates a monthly newspaper, Osage News. The Osage Nation has an official website and uses a variety of communication media and technology.

=== Judicial branch ===
The judicial branch maintains courts to interpret the laws of the Osage Nation. It has the power to adjudicate civil and criminal matters, resolve disputes, and judicial review. The highest court is the Supreme Court. This Supreme Court has a Chief Justice, currently Meredith Drent, who replaced former Chief Justice Charles Lohah. There is also a lower Trial Court and more inferior courts as allowed by the tribal constitution.

=== Executive Branch ===
The executive branch is headed by a principal chief, followed by an assistant principal chief.

As of 2025, the current administration is:

- Principal Chief: Geoffrey Standing Bear
- Assistant Principal Chief: R.J. Walker

They were both sworn in on July 2, 2014. Administrative offices also fall under this executive branch.

==== Osage Nation Museum ====
Located in Pawhuska, Oklahoma, the Osage Nation Museum provides interpretations and displays of Osage history, art, and culture. The continuously changing exhibits convey the story of the Osage people throughout history and celebrate Osage culture today. Highlights include an extensive photograph collection, historical artifacts, and traditional and contemporary art. Founded in 1938, the museum is the oldest tribally owned museum in the United States. Historian Louis F. Burns donated much of his extensive personal collection of artifacts and documents to the museum. In 2021, a Missouri cave was discovered with ancient Osage art. The contents were sold at auction, but the Osage leadership insists it belongs to the nation.

=== Legislative Branch ===
The legislative branch consists of a Congress that works to create and maintain Osage laws. In addition to this role, their mission is to preserve the checks and balances within the Osage government, carry out oversight responsibilities, support trial revenues, and preserve and protect the nation's environment. This Congress is made up of twelve individuals who are elected by the Osage constituency and serve four-year terms. They hold two regular congressional sessions and are headquartered in Pawhuska.

=== Mineral Council ===
The Osage Tribal Council was created under the Osage Allotment Act of 1906. It consisted of a principal chief, an assistant principal chief, and eight members of the Osage tribal council. The mineral estate consists of more than natural gas and petroleum. Although these two resources have yielded the most profit, the Osage have also earned revenue from leases for the mining of lead, zinc, limestone, and coal deposits. Water may also be considered a profitable asset that is controlled by the Mineral Council.

The first elections for this council were held in 1908 on the first Monday in June. Officers were elected for a term of two years, which made it difficult for them to accomplish long-term goals. If for some reason the principal chief's office becomes vacant, a replacement is elected by the remaining council members. Later in the 20th century, the tribe increased the terms of office of council members to four years.

In 1994 by referendum, the tribe voted for a new constitution. Among its provisions was the separation of the Mineral Council, or Mineral Estate, from regular tribal government. According to the constitution, only Osage citizens who are Osage headright holders can vote for the members of the Mineral Council. It is as if they were shareholders of a corporation.

== Education ==
On July 3, 2019, the tribe chartered Bacone College in Muskogee, Oklahoma, as its tribal college.

School districts in the Osage Nation include Hominy School District, Pawhuska School District, and Woodland School District of Fairfax. There is a private immersion school, Daposka Ahnkodapi Elementary School. The Bureau of Indian Education (BIE) has no affiliated nor directly-operated facilities within the nation.

== Economy ==
The Osage Nation issues its own tribal vehicle tags and operates its own housing authority. The tribe owns a truck stop, a gas station, and ten smoke shops.

In the 21st century, the tribe opened its first gaming casino and by 2013 had seven casinos. Casinos are located in Tulsa, Sand Springs, Bartlesville, Skiatook, Ponca City, Hominy and Pawhuska. The tribe's annual economic impact in 2010 was estimated to be $222 million. Osage Million Dollar Elm, the casino management company, is encouraging employees in education, paying for certificate classes related to their business, as well as for classes leading to bachelor's and master's business degrees.

== Representations in media ==
- John Joseph Mathews, an Osage writer and historian, explored the adverse social effects of the oil boom for the Osage Nation in his semi-autobiographical novel Sundown (1934); he also wrote histories of the nation, based in part on the oral histories of tribal elders.
- Linda Hogan wrote Mean Spirit, a novel based upon the Osage Murders that is also a depiction of traditional indigenous culture.
- Laura Ingalls Wilder wrote a series of children's books, known as Little House on the Prairie (1932–1943). The novel Little House on the Prairie and its TV adaptation are based on her family's pioneer days in Kansas. They lived on Osage land and encountered citizens of the tribe.
- The Reign of Terror was explored in David Grann's book Killers of the Flower Moon (2017). A screenplay developed from the book was the basis of Martin Scorsese's 2023 film of the same name, which received 10 Oscar-nominations.

== Notable Osage ==
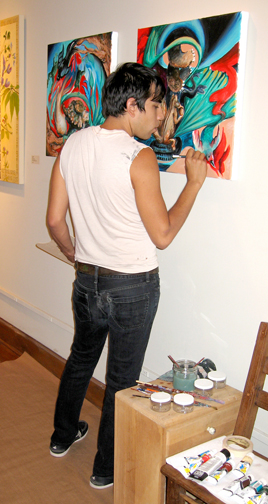
Yatika Starr Fields, Osage painter and muralist

- Fred Lookout (1865–1949), principal chief
- Monte Blue (1887–1963), American actor of the silent and sound eras.
- Louis F. Burns (1920–2012), historian and author, a leading expert on Osage history, customs, and mythology.
- Charles Curtis (1860–1936), 31st Vice President of the United States, Senate Majority Leader and Majority Whip, President pro tempore of the U.S. Senate, and U.S. representative from Kansas. Curtis's mother Ellen Pappan Curtis was one-quarter each of Kaw, Osage, Potawatomi and French ancestry; Curtis was enrolled as Kaw.
- Cody Deal (born 1986), television and film actor, best known for his role in the Syfy Original Movie, Almighty Thor
- Jerry C. Elliott (born 1943), one of the first Native Americans in NASA, received the Presidential Medal of Freedom for his actions in saving the lives of the three astronauts aboard Apollo 13.
- Joseph Pawnee-no-pashe, "Governor Joe" (1835–1883), first Governor of the Great and Little Osages, becoming the first elected Principal Chief of the Osage Nation in 1882.
- Guy Erwin (born 1958), first openly gay bishop in the Evangelical Lutheran Church in America (elected 31 May 2013).
- Shonke Mon-thi, a diplomat to the United States government in the early 20th century
- Yatika Starr Fields (born 1980), painter, muralist and street artist.
- Scott George (born 1957 or 1958) was nominated for an Academy Award for Best Original Song for his song "Wahzhazhe (A Song for My People)" from Killers of the Flower Moon (2023).
- David Holt (politician) (born 1979), Mayor of Oklahoma City; served in the Oklahoma State Senate; he was the first Osage elected to statewide office since 2006.

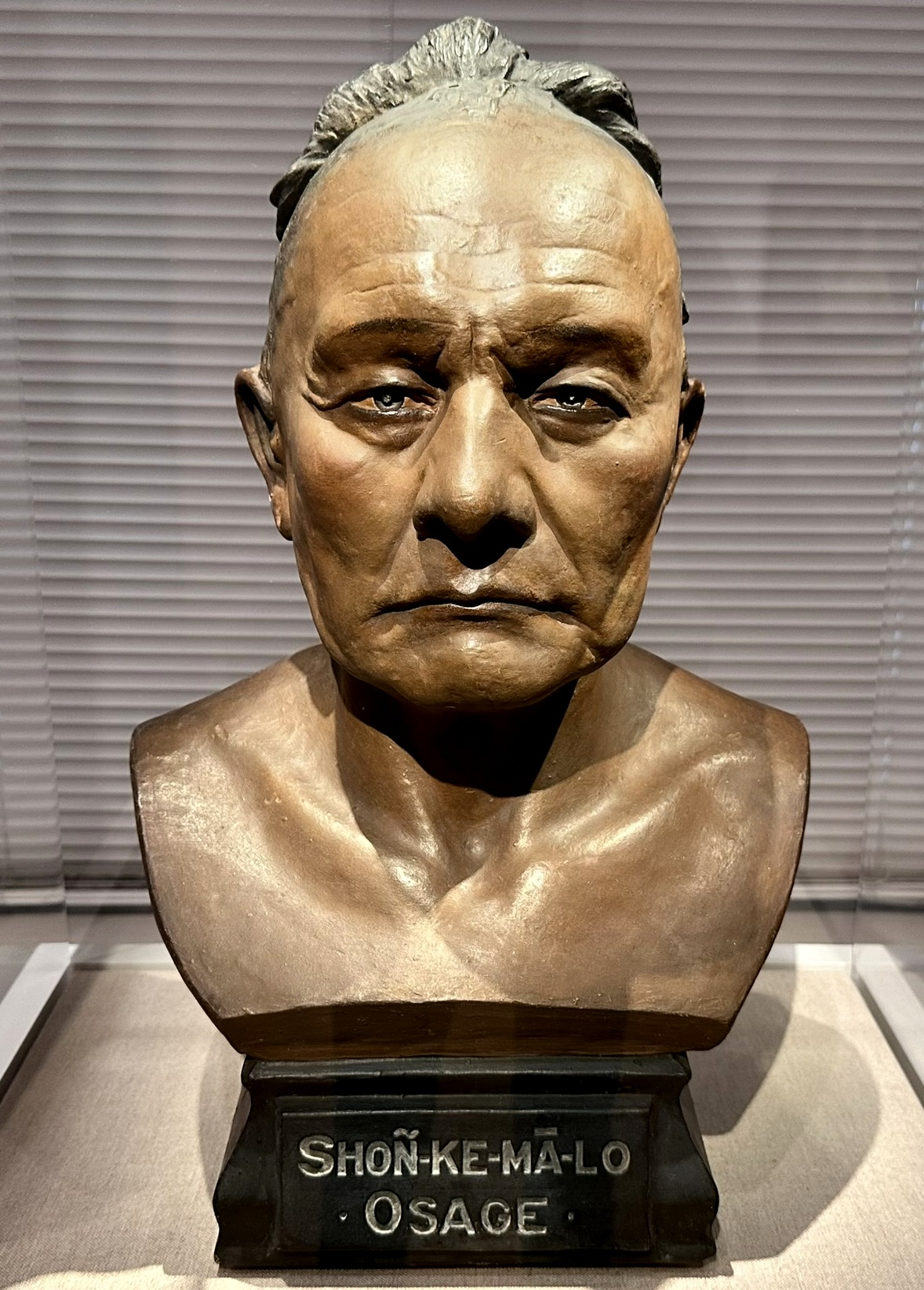
Shonke Mon-thi^, a diplomat to the United States government in the early 20th century

- Kihegashugah or Little Chief, an Osage leader who traveled to France in the 1820s.
- John Joseph Mathews (c. 1894–1979), author and historian of the Osage Nation; World War I veteran.
- Ne-kah-wah-she-tun-kah, (1839–1923), last hereditary chief of the Osage and prolific scalper. He was elected Principal Chief of the Osage Nation for two terms. He was the younger brother of Governor Joe.
- Carter Revard (1931-2022), poet, author, and Rhodes Scholar, also a specialist in medieval British literature
- Chance Rencountre (born December 31, 1986), mixed martial artist competing in the Welterweight division in the Ultimate Fighting Championship.
- Lucille Robedeaux (1915–2005), tribal elder and last surviving native speaker of the Osage language
- Sacred Sun, a 19th-century Osage woman who was among a group taken to France.
- Larry Sellers, actor, stuntman, linguistic mentor.
- Maria Tallchief, classical ballerina with the New York City Ballet; contributed greatly to the success of ballet as a dance art in the United States.
- Marjorie Tallchief, professional ballerina. Both sisters were prima ballerinas who performed in many countries throughout the 20th century.
- Clarence L. Tinker (1887–1942), U.S. Army aviation officer who died during World War II while on a Pacific combat mission during the Japanese attack on Midway Island in June 1942. Achieved rank as major general. Tinker Air Force Base in Oklahoma City, Oklahoma, is named in his honor.
- Chief White Hair, the name of several Osage skiagusta in the 18th and 19th century. The indigenous name is anglicized as Pawhuska, also used as the name of a town in Oklahoma.
- Big Soldier, painted in Philadelphia in 1805, toured Europe in the 1820s
- Xander Cole (born 2003), actor from the WaXaKoLi district.

== Works cited ==
- Bailey, Garrick (1995). The Osage and the Invisible World: From the Works of Francis La Flesche. Norman: University of Oklahoma Press. ISBN 0-8061-3132-2.
- Burns, Louis F. (2004). A History of the Osage People. University of Alabama Press. ISBN 978-0-8173-5018-5.
- Burns, Louis (2001). Osage Indian Bands and Clans. Baltimore, Maryland: Clearfield. ISBN 0-8063-5112-8.
- Ewers, John C. (1968). Indian life on the Upper Missouri. Norman: University of Oklahoma Press.
- Grann, David (2017). Killers of the Flower Moon: The Osage Murders and the Birth of the FBI (First Vintage Books ed.). New York: Vintage Books. ISBN 978-0-385-53425-3.
- La Flesche, Francis (1932). A Dictionary of the Osage Language. US Government Printing Office.
- Primm, James Neal (1998). Lion of the valley: St. Louis, Missouri, 1764-1980 (3rd ed.). St. Louis: Missouri Historical Society Press. ISBN 978-1-883982-24-9. OL 360268M.
- Robertson, R. G. (2001). Rotting Face: Smallpox and the American Indian. Lincoln: Caxton Press.
- Rollings, Willard H. (1995). The Osage: An Ethnohistorical Study of Hegemony on the Prairie-Plains. Columbia: University of Missouri Press. ISBN 978-0-8262-1006-7.
- Schultz, George A. (1972). An Indian Canaan: Isaac McCoy and the Vision of an Indian State. Norman: University of Oklahoma Press.
- Wilson, Terry P. (1985). The Underground Reservation: Osage Oil. Lincoln and London: University of Nebraska Press. ISBN 0803247338., Open Library: The Underground Reservation.
