= Osage Nation Museum =

Museum in Pawhuska, Oklahoma

Coordinates: 36.6678°N 96.3400°W

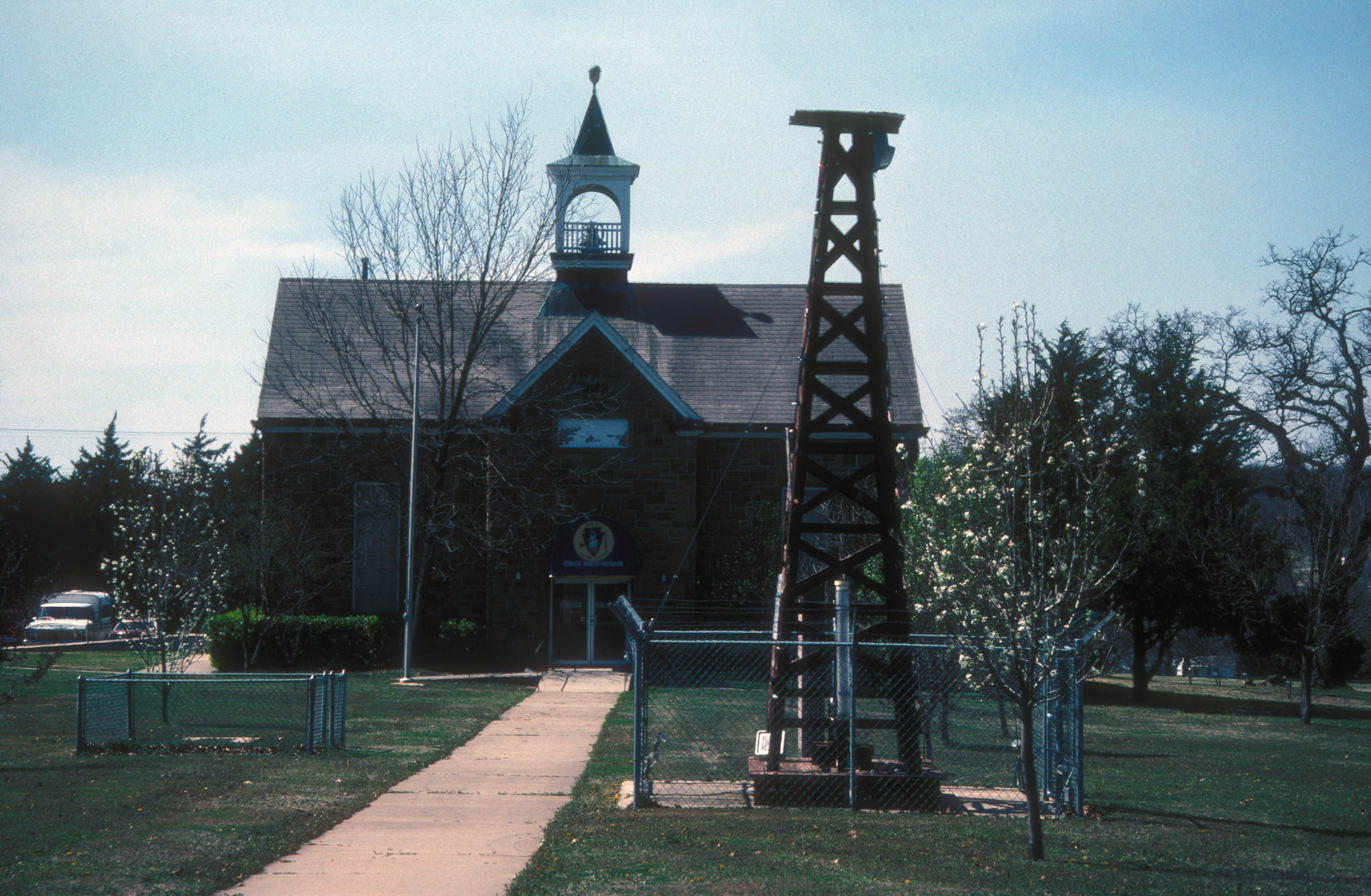
The Osage Tribal Museum, c. 1980s

The Osage Nation Museum (ONM) in Pawhuska, Oklahoma, is devoted to Osage history, art, and culture. Highlights include an extensive photograph collection, historical artifacts, and traditional and contemporary art.

Founded in 1938, the ONM is the oldest tribally owned museum in the United States. Historian Louis F. Burns donated much of his extensive personal collection of artifacts and documents to the museum.

The Osage Nation also has a historic preservation office, archives, and cultural office. It is working to revive the Osage language, with immersion in Head Start classes and elementary school, as well as classes for youth and adults.
