= Lucille Robedeaux =

Osage tribal leader (1915–2005)

- Born: Lucille Belle Matin; June 10, 1915; Wynona, Oklahoma, U.S.
- Died: November 3, 2005 (aged 90)
- Other name: Lucille Roubedeaux
- Occupation: tribal leader of the Osage of Oklahoma
- Known for: last surviving native speaker of the Osage language
- Spouse: Lee Robedeaux (m. 1946)
- Parents: Walter Jones (father); Maggy Helen Matin (mother)

Lucille Belle Robedeaux (née Matin, June 10, 1915 – November 3, 2005), sometimes spelt Roubedeaux, was a tribal leader of the Osage of Oklahoma and the last surviving native speaker of the Osage language.

== Life ==
Lucille Belle Matin was born in Wynona, Oklahoma, a daughter of Walter Jones and Maggy Helen Matin of the Eagle Clan. Her parents soon moved to Hominy, where she attended school. She was one of the last Osage to have a traditional marriage, with the exchange of many horses. On November 4, 1946, she married Lee Robedeaux, and they had children.

Robedeaux worked at St. John's Hospital, Tulsa, as a nurse's aide from the 1950s until she retired in the late 1970s. An active member of the Altar Society of St. Joseph's Catholic Church and of the Mound Valley Homemakers, she became a community leader, as an Elder of the Osage Nation and as advisor of the Tribal Dance Committee, promoting the carrying on of Osage traditions. She was fond of bull fights and the horse races in Hot Springs, Arkansas, and traveled around the US and also to Hawaii, Mexico, and Europe.

By the time of Robedeaux's death in 2005, aged ninety, she was the last native speaker of the Osage language. A program had been initiated to revive the language, but with little success: "This is the last train out. If we can't get it done this time around, then that's it. There is no more after this" said "Uncle Mogre" of the Osage, who had been working to preserve the language. The Osage language had then been dwindling for nearly 200 years.
