= Almighty Thor =

2011 television film directed by Christopher Olen Ray

- DVD cover
- Directed by: Christopher Olen Ray
- Written by: Eric Forsberg
- Produced by: David Michael Latt; David Rimawi; Paul Bales
- Starring: Cody Deal; Patricia Velásquez; Kevin Nash; Richard Grieco; Nicole Fox
- Cinematography: Alexander Yellen
- Edited by: Benjamin Lee Cooper; Ron Santiano
- Music by: Chris Ridenhour
- Distributed by: The Asylum
- Release date: May 7, 2011
- Running time: 92 minutes
- Country: United States
- Language: English
- Budget: $200,000

Almighty Thor is a 2011 American superhero television film directed by Christopher Olen Ray. The film, a mockbuster coinciding with the release of the Marvel Studios film Thor, was produced by The Asylum for $200,000. It premiered on the Syfy cable network on May 7, 2011 and was released on DVD on May 10, 2011 in the United States. The film was met with a largely negative response from critics. Loosely inspired by Norse mythology, the film follows the young warrior Thor (Cody Deal) in his battle against Loki (Richard Grieco).

In 2022, The Asylum released a second Thor film titled Thor: God of Thunder.

== Plot ==
When the god of deception Loki (Richard Grieco) wipes off the city of Valhalla to steal the Hammer Of Invincibility, only the young hero Thor (Cody Deal) can recover the cities from evil. When Thor's father and older brother are killed in a futile attempt to retrieve the hammer from Loki, a Valkyrie named Jarnsaxa (Patricia Velásquez) attempts to train a naïve and inexperienced warrior Thor to fight Loki. This leads them on a short quest from their training camp, to the Tree of Inventory to collect a sword and shield and then to a small city where Loki attempts to hypnotize the refusing residents into serving as his minions by bringing on a wipeout with a small army of demon beasts. When Thor is about to be defeated, he must forge his own fate to save the city and reclaim the Hammer Of Invincibility from Loki once and for all.

== Cast ==
- Cody Deal as Thor
- Richard Grieco as Loki
- Patricia Velásquez as Járnsaxa
- Kevin Nash as Odin
- Jess Allen as Baldir
- Chris Ivan Cevic as Himdall
- Rodney Wilson as Hrothgar
- Kristen Kerr as Herja
- Charlie Glackin as Hundig
- Nicole Fox as Redhead Norn
- Leslea Fisher as Blonde Norn
- Lauren Halperin as Brunette Norn
- William Webb as Street Punk
- Jason Medbury as the Tree of Life Guardian

== Release ==
Almighty Thor premiered on May 7, 2011, near the time of release of Marvel Studios' Thor.

== Reception ==
Almighty Thor received largely negative reviews from critics. Reviewing the film for The A.V. Club, Phil Dyess-Nugent gave Almighty Thor a rating of "D−", taking issue with the film's low budget: "The film is so underpopulated that most of the awful deaths Loki inflicts go down off-camera; he points his stick or gives a command to his dogs, and then you hear somebody holler, "Argghhhh!!"" Dyess-Nugent also criticized the acting of the leads and took issue with the producer's decision to shoot the LA scenes in abandoned parking lots: "The comic high point is a fight between Thor and Loki, with the guys spinning around and waving their weapons at each other while keeping one eye peeled for cops who might demand to see their filming permit." The Blueprint website review of the film stated, "This brain numbing 80 minutes of constant noise, cheap effects, background music that never once stops and ropey acting will test the patience of even the most hardened B-movie aficionado ... Almighty Thor was just one giant headache of a film." In a humorous and ironic review, Stuart Heritage from the Guardian declared that Almighty Thor was better than the Marvel film on which it was based.
