= Cody Deal =

American actor in film and television

- Born: Cody Austin Deal; February 14, 1986 (age 40); Norman, Oklahoma, U.S.
- Occupations: Actor, model
- Years active: 2008–present
- Height: 1.88 m (6 ft 2 in)
- Relatives: Kyle Deal (twin brother), Lucas Deal (brother)

Cody Austin Deal (born February 14, 1986) is an American actor in film and television. He is best known for his role as Thor in the direct to cable Syfy original movie Almighty Thor. He starred alongside Richard Grieco, Patricia Velasquez, and Kevin Nash.

== Biography ==
He is the son of Diane Boulanger and has a twin brother named Kyle and an older brother named Lucas. Deal grew up in Sedan, Kansas and self-identifies as Osage.

== Filmography ==
=== Film ===
Year	Title	Role	Notes
2008	Laffapalooza!	Centurion	
2009	The Hangover	Roman soldier at Caesars Palace	uncredited
2010	Get Him to the Greek	Strip Club Patron	uncredited
2011	Almighty Thor	Thor	
2016	Deadly Pickup	Charlie	
2016	The Adventures of Avery & Pete	Mark Hardon	
TBA	Hallow Pointe	Curt	

=== Television ===
Year	Title	Role	Notes
2008	Funniest Movies of the Year: 2008	Egyptian Guard	uncredited
2008	Spike TV VGA Video Game Awards	Craps Player	
2012	The Girl's Guide to Depravity	Jordan	3 episodes
