= Daposka Ahnkodapi Schools =

School in Pawhuska, Oklahoma

Coordinates: 36.6726°N 96.3380°W

Daposka Ahnkodapi Schools, also known as Daposka Ahnkodapi Elementary School (Osage: 𐓈𐒰𐓄𐓂𐓆𐒼𐒰 𐒰͘𐒼𐓂𐓈𐒰𐓬𐒻, meaning "Our School"), is a private (from the perspective of the State of Oklahoma and the National Center for Education Statistics) elementary and middle school in Pawhuska, Oklahoma. As of 2024 it goes up to grade 7.

It has a program of immersion in the Osage language, and the Osage Nation tribe governs the school. According to Alex RedCorn, the school is the first such primary and secondary school which is controlled by the tribe and uses Osage language education.

== History ==
It opened in 2015 and was accredited in 2021. Initially the school had only preschool levels, but additional grades were to be added as time passes. In 2019 it went up to grade 2. In early 2021 it had up to grade 4, and at the time the enrollment count was 40. The intention is to have the school go up to grade 12.

During the COVID-19 pandemic in Oklahoma, the school had home visits so staff could help convey Osage language teaching to students, and the school implemented online programming to teach Osage.

=== Closure ===
Daposka Ahnkodapi was closed in 2026 due to budget constraints. The Osage Nation Congress allocated almost $3 million to reopen it in October of that year, but the then-Principal Chief, Joe Tillman, pocket-vetoed the legislation, saying it did not provide for the program's financial stability in the long-term. A law enforcement raid subsequently happened in a home school co-op called Zhinkazhin Learning Center, said to be in possession of Daposka Ahnkodapi books and materials.

== Curriculum ==
Osage language school instructions are incorporated in routines.
