= Osage language =

Language of the Osage people of North America

Osage
- 𐓏𐒰𐓓𐒰𐓓𐒷 𐒻𐒷, Wažáže ie
- Native to: United States
- Region: Oklahoma
- Ethnicity: Osage
- Extinct: 2005, with the death of Lucille Robedeaux
- Revival: As of 2009, 15–20 L2 speakers, ongoing revival program
- Language family: Siouan-Catawban languages: Siouan; Mississippi Valley; Dhegihan; Kansa–Osage; Osage
- Writing system: Latin, Osage script

Language codes
- ISO 639-2: osa
- ISO 639-3: osa
- Glottolog: osag1243
- ELP: Osage
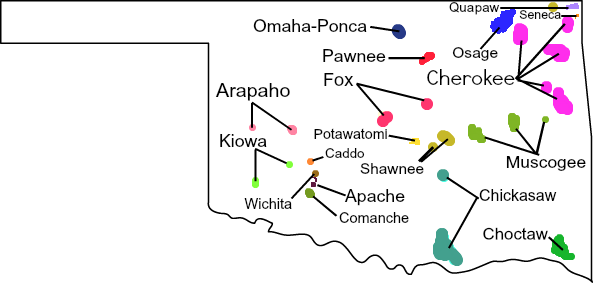
- Map showing the distribution of Oklahoma Indian Languages

- Osage is classified as Critically Endangered by the UNESCO Atlas of the World's Languages in Danger.

𐓏𐓘𐓻𐓘𐓻𐓟 (Wažaže) "Middle Waters"
- People: 𐓏𐓘𐓻𐓘𐓻𐓟 (Wažaže)
- Language: 𐓏𐓘𐓻𐓘𐓻𐓟𐓣𐓟 (Wažažeie)
- Country: 𐓏𐓘𐓻𐓘𐓻𐓟 𐓀𐓘͘𐓻𐓘͘ (Wažaže Mązhą)

Osage (/oʊˈseɪdʒ, ˈoʊseɪdʒ/; Osage script: 𐓏𐒰𐓓𐒰𐓓𐒷 𐒻𐒷, Wažáže ie) is a Dhegihan language of the Siouan language family spoken by the people of the Osage Nation in northern Oklahoma. Their original territory was in the present-day Ohio River Valley, which they shared with other Dhegihan-speaking nations. Slowly they migrated to present-day Missouri and Kansas areas (see Dhegihan migration), but they were gradually pushed west by pressure from invading colonial forces and settlement by other displaced Native American nations.

Osage has an inventory of sounds very similar to that of Dakota, a related language, plus vowel length, preaspirated obstruents and an interdental fricative (like "th" in English "then"). In contrast to Dakota, phonemically aspirated obstruents appear phonetically as affricates, and the high back vowel *u has been fronted to [y].

Osage is written primarily with two systems: one using the Latin script with diacritics, and another derived Osage script created in 2006. Osage is among the few indigenous languages in the United States that has developed its own writing system.

== Language revitalization ==
As of 2009, about 15–20 elders were second-language speakers of Osage. The Osage Language Program, created in 2003, provides audio and video learning materials on its website. The 2nd Annual Dhegiha Gathering in 2012 brought Osage, Kaw, Quapaw, Ponca and Omaha speakers together to share best practices in language revitalization.

In early 2015, Osage Nation Chief Geoffrey Standing Bear announced he would make Osage language immersion a priority. The tribe’s immersion school, Daposka Ahnkodapi, was closed in 2026 due to budget constraints. The Osage Nation Congress allocated almost $3 million to reopen it in October of that year, but the then-Principal Chief, Joe Tillman, pocket-vetoed the legislation, saying it did not provide for the program's financial stability in the long-term. A law enforcement raid subsequently happened in a home school co-op called Zhinkazhin Learning Center, said to be in possession of Daposka Ahnkodapi books and materials.

== Phonology ==
Osage phonology is quite similar to that of Kansa. But, it preserves many historical alternations that have been leveled out in Kansa; for example, Kansa *u has merged with *i, whereas it is still largely distinct in Osage.

=== Vowels ===
==== Basic vowels ====
Osage has five plain vowels:

	Front		Central	Back
	Unrounded	Rounded	Central	Back
Close	i	y ~ ʉ		
Mid	ɛ			o
Open			ə ~ ɑ	

These are written ⟨i u e o a⟩.

/u/ varies between central and front, [ʉ ~ y], and frequently unrounds to /i/. It is especially far front [y] following a velar obstruent and when it is near a front vowel with no intervening obstruent. It most commonly conflates with /i/ following ð and n.

Usually in fast speech, unstressed /a/ is pronounced [ə]. This occurs after a stressed syllable, or at the end of a word. For example: céska [tsɛ́skə] 'cow', tóa [tóə] 'this one'.

==== Nasalized vowels ====
There are three vowels that carry this feature: [ɑ̃] [ĩ] [õ]. It is quite common for nasalized [ɑ̃] to become a nasal [õ] and vice versa. Non-nasalized vowels can be heard as nasalized as well. In general, vowels tend to become nasalized adjacent to another nasal vowel or consonant when there is no intervening obstruent. On the other hand, final nasal vowels tend to become oral. However, nasal vowels are always short, regardless of their position. Examples: [ʃímĩʒɛ] 'girl' and [paˑɣõ] 'mountain'

==== Vowel clusters and long vowels ====
According to Hans Wolff (65), common Osage vowel clusters are:

- iu [iü] for example: niuʒõ 'Neosho River'
- íe [íɛ]~[íi] for example: wíe 'I'
- íĩ [íĩ] for example: kasíĩte 'tomorrow'
- iuĩ [üĩ] for example: ékiuĩka 'don't'
- éa [ɛ́a]~[ɛ́ə] for example: cʼéaðe 'I killed him'
- aĩ [ɛ̃] for example: hówaĩke 'where?'
- óa [óə] for example: tóa 'this one'

Vowel length is important in Osage, but it is hard to perceive and has a good deal of variation. For example, long vowels are often reduced to short ones when they are not accented. Quintero took long vowels to be the underlying form in such situations. There is not enough information to specify exactly how the accent system works in Osage, and there is still uncertainty about Osage vowel length.

Oral vowels are long before non-stop consonants and in final stressed position. When they are unstressed in final position, they are always short.

Lengthening of short vowels often occurs in questions.

Example: /ʃkó̃ʃta/ 'you want' becomes [ʃkó̃õʃta]?

Long vowels also arise when ð is omitted between identical vowels.

Example: ðakʼéwaða 'be kind to them' may become ðakʼéwaa.

When e(e) changes to a(a), an immediately preceding c is often replaced by t (though not always)

Example: océ 'look for, hunt for' becomes otá 'look for it!'

==== Diphthongs ====
The vowel sequences /aĩ/ /eĩ/ /oĩ/ and /ai/ are almost certainly diphthongs. The Osage script has letters to represent each of the diphthongs.

=== Consonants ===
There are thirty-one consonant phonemes in Osage, of which twenty-two are voiceless and nine are voiced. However, Osage has a rich system of stop sounds, known as the stop series or the stop sequence (See below).

		Bilabial	Dentalveolar	Postalveolar	Velar	Glottal
Nasals		m	n			
Stops	Preaspirated (fortis)	ʰp~pː	ʰt~tː, ʰts~tːs, ʰtʃ~tːʃ		ʰk~kː	
Stops	Tenuis (lenis)	p	t, ts, tʃ		k	(ʔ)
Stops	Aspirated	px~pʃ	tx~tsʰ		kx~kʃ	
Stops	Ejective	pʼ	tsʼ		kʼ	
Stops	Voiced	br				
Fricatives			s, z	ʃ, ʒ	x, ɣ	h
Approximants			ð, l, (r)		w	

==== Stop series ====
The stop series can be grouped according to five categories:

- Voiceless preaspirated or fortis: which may be pronounced as geminates or preaspirated. As in other Siouan languages, they sometimes derive from h-C sequences, but not always.
- Voiceless plain or lenis: which are tenuis, and often lightly voiced.
- Postaspirated: which never appear as a surface form.
- Ejective /pʼ/, /t͡sʼ/, /kʼ/. They cannot appear as the second member of a consonant cluster. Historical *tʼ is /cʼ/ in Osage.
- Voiced: with b being the only member in this category. The only environment this sound may appear in is in the cluster [br]. The cluster itself generally appears in the first verb form, otherwise it is somewhat infrequent.(see historical phonology section).

The ejective, fortis, and lenis series of the alphabet are not distinguished in Osage orthography.

Listed below is some features and phonological alternations of Osage:

- [px], [tx], [kx] occur before back vowels, [pʃ], [tsʰ], [kʃ] (usually) before the other vowels.
- The voiceless unaspirated affricate /ts/ has two allophones: [tʃ] after [ʃ]; elsewhere it is [ts].

/ts/ → [tʃ]/_[ʃ]

Examples:

íðotse 'be open'
ihtṍtse 'son-in-law'
ðekṍõce 'now'
[mɑ̃ʃtʃĩ́kɛ] 'rabbit'
[ʃtʃɛ́] 'you went'

- The glottal stop [ʔ] appears in clusters only after p, c, k, and it is not considered a true consonant of Osage. It is best thought of as a phonetic device used occasionally at utterance level, and it is typically to separate vowels that would otherwise contract.
- /x/ has two allophones, [x] and [ɣ]. [ɣ] occurs between vowels, elsewhere it is [x].

/x/ → [ɣ]/V__V

Examples:

[hóxpe] 'cough'
[hpéɣe] 'gourd'
[nɑ̃́ɑ̃ɣe] 'spirit'
[hkáɣe] 'crow'

- The phoneme /h/ is always voiceless.
- /ð/ usually has a single allophone [ð], but in the Hominy dialect it has two allophones: [d] initially before /a/ and [ð] elsewhere.

/ð/ → [d]/#__a

Examples:

ðɑ̃lĩ [dɑ̃dlĩ] 'good'
ðɑ̃brĩ [dɑ̃bəðĩ] 'three'
ðĩe [ðĩɛ] 'you'
cʼéðe [tsʼɛˑðɛ] 'he killed it'

- The /br/ cluster also depends on dialect. It is sometimes pronounced [bəl] or [bər].
- In some instances, due to morphologically complex formations, [r] is an allophone of /ð/

Examples:

brĩiʃtɑ̃ 'I'm finished'
abrĩ 'I have'
waabrṍ 'I am unable'

The dentalveolar obstruents are often fricated: the ejective always (though it has other sources as well), and the other series before the front vowels /i ĩ e u/. Exceptions occur due to compounding and other derivational processes. For example, from hką́ą́ce 'fruit' and oolá 'put in' is hkąącóla 'pie'. (The fricated allophone is written c.)

Č, hč are rare, and only found in diminutives: č only in two words, čóopa 'a little', čáahpa 'squat', and hč for hc in endearment forms of kin terms like wihčóšpa 'my grandchild'. In Hominy, šc is pronounced šč.

==== Consonant clusters ====
Osage has a simple expanded CV syllabic template: (C(C)) V (V). All consonants occur initially and medially; they never occur in final position. Consonant clusters of the type CC only occur in initial and medial positions. Furthermore, only voiceless consonants form clusters, with the exception of [br]. The initial clusters are [pʃ] [kʃ] [tsʼ] [st] [sts] [sk] [ʃt] [ʃk] [br], excluding aspirated stops.

Examples:

pʃĩta 'I'll come (to your house)'
kʃí 'he reached home'
ʰtséka 'crazy'
stúʒa 'you wash it'
stsétse 'long'
skɑ̃ 'white'
ʃtátɑ̃ 'you drank it'
ʃkṍʃta 'you wanted it'
bráze 'torn'

Medial clusters may be divided into two groups:

- Cluster whose first C is p, t, c, or k

Examples:

tapʼõkʼe 'he hit it'
wécʼa 'snake'
nɑ̃ḱṍ 'he heard it'
aṍpha 'I understand it'
áthɑ̃ 'he kicked it'
áððikhɑ̃ 'he lay down'
épʃe 'I spoke'
ðacpé 'to eat'
nĩ́kʃe 'you are here'
nã́kwĩ 'both, we two'

- Cluster whose first C is s, ʃ, x, or h

Examples:

ĩ́spe 'ax'
laská 'flower'
ókisce 'half'
ðaʃtú 'to bite'
paʃpú 'to chip'
iʃtá 'eyes'
walúʃks 'bug'
mɑ̃ʃcĩ́ke 'rabbit'
mɑ̃xpú 'clouds'
ðaxtáke 'to bite'
mõĩ́xka 'soil/dirt'
wĩ́xci 'one'

=== Historical phonology ===
The historically aspirated series *pʰ *tʰ *kʰ is seldom realized with aspiration today. Before back vowels they are [px tx kx], and before front vowels [pʃ tsʰ kʃ] (written pš ch kš). Some speakers from Hominy assimilate tx to [tkx] or [kx].

Đ, n, r all derive from historic *r, and l from *kr and *xr. The latter is a recent phenomenon; in the 1930s words with modern l were transcribed xth and gth. Historically *r became ð before oral vowels and n before nasal vowels, but since the nasalization has often been lost, there are minimal pairs and /l, n/ are now separate phonemes. Nonetheless, intervocalic ð is optionally pronounced [n] in many words. It is also sometimes strongly palatalized intervocalically, to the point of becoming [j].

In words with l, this is sometimes pronounced [hl] or [dl]. The former derives from historic *xl, the latter from *kð and *gð; these sequences have largely merged with simple *l. This is productive; ð in verbs may become l when prefixed with k.

The r is apparently an approximant like English [ɹ]. Br is most common in first-person forms of verbs beginning with ð, where the 1sg agent prefix w(a)- assimilates to [b] before the ð, and indeed this was written bth in the 1930s. However, in rarer cases the origin of br is opaque.

== In popular culture ==
The Osage Nation Chief Geoffrey Standing Bear and the Nation's language department have consulted Martin Scorsese during the production of his movie Killers of the Flower Moon (2023), which featured Osage dialogue. The movie, which was based on the Osage Indian murders, also featured Osage traditional clothing and the Osage script. Osage and non-Osage actors, including Robert De Niro, spoke lines in the language.

== Sources ==
- Quintero, Carolyn. The Osage Language. Lincoln, University of Nebraska Press, 2004. ISBN 0-8032-3803-7.
- Quintero, Carolyn. Osage Dictionary. Norman, University of Oklahoma Press, 2009. ISBN 978-0-8061-3844-2.
- Wolff, Hans. "Osage I: Phonemes and Historical Phonology". International Journal of American Linguistics 18.2 (1952): 63–68.
