= Herja =

Valkyrie

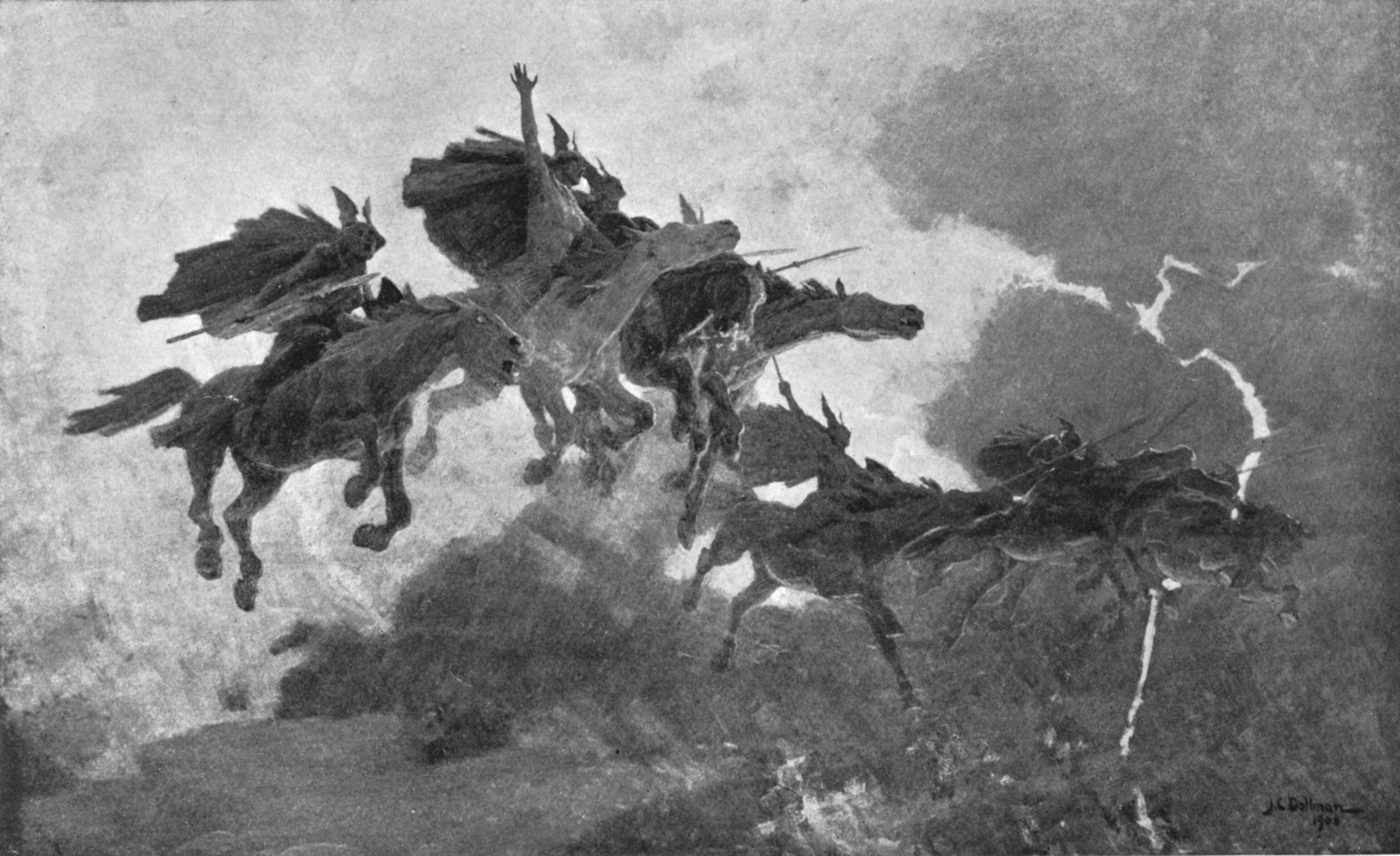
"The Ride of the Valkyrs" (1909) by John Charles Dollman

In Norse mythology Herja (Old Norse) is a valkyrie attested in the longer of the two Nafnaþulur lists found in the Prose Edda.

Rudolf Simek says the name is etymologically related to the Old Norse herja and Old High German herjón (meaning "devastate"), and derives from Proto-Germanic word *Herjaza. Simek notes that the Continental Germanic goddess name Hariasa (attested from a now lost 2nd century stone found in Cologne, Germany) also derives from *Herjaza, but says that "it is almost impossible to say whether Herja was an original name of a goddess including among the North Germanic peoples," and that "an independent development is equally likely in the case of a 'goddess of war'."
