= Dhegihan migration =

Pre-contact migration of Siouan peoples

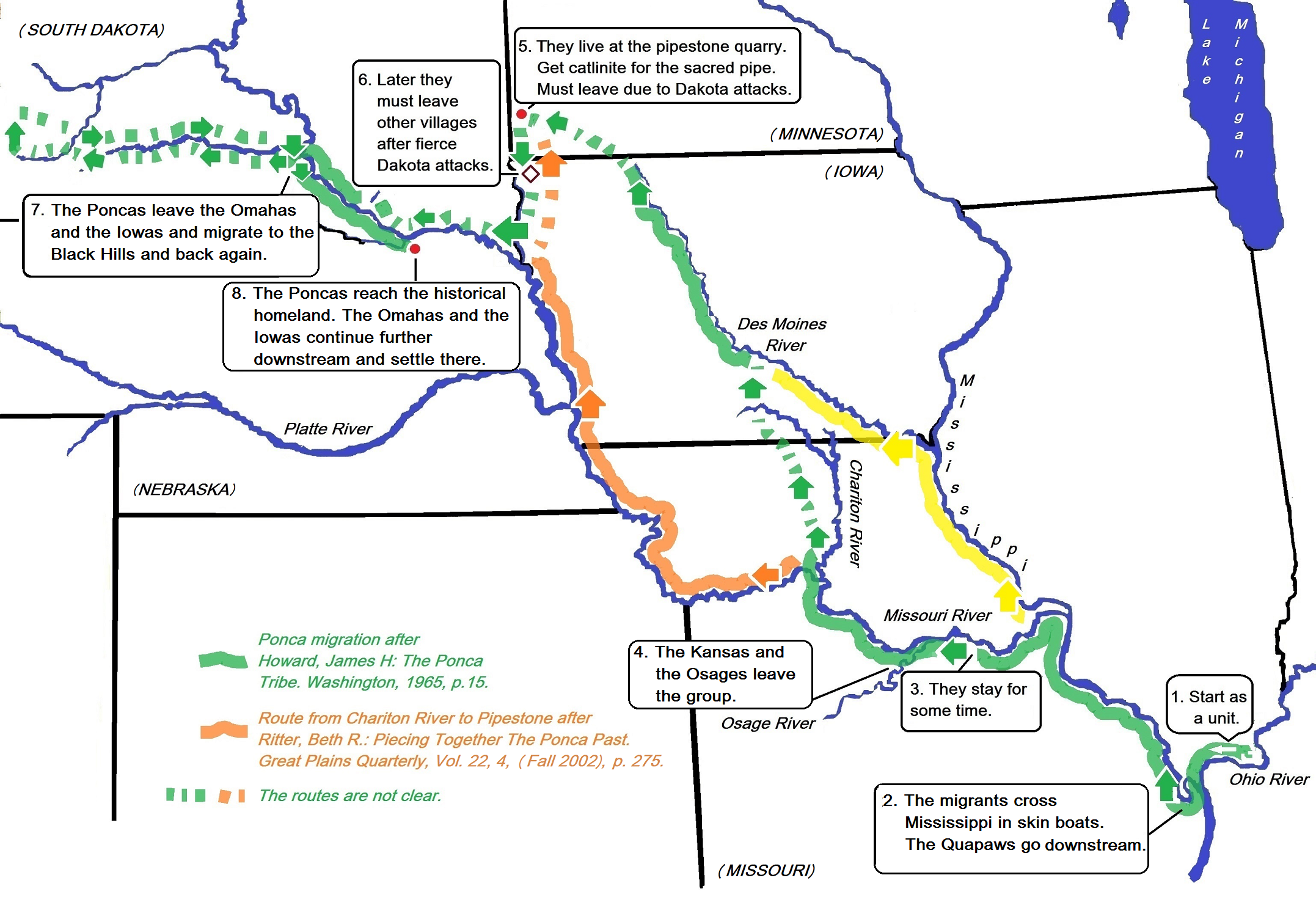
The migration story of the Quapaw, Omaha, Osage, Kansa (Kaw) and Ponca according to oral traditions

The Dhegihan migration and separation was the long journey on foot by the North American Indians in the ancient Hą́ke tribe. During the migration from present-day Illinois/Kentucky and as far as Nebraska, they gradually split up into five groups. Each became an independent and historic tribe. They are the Omaha, Ponca, Kaw or Kansa, Osage and Quapaw.

The term "Dhegiha" refers to all five Indian tribes since they each speak a Dhegiha Siouan language. Besides having related languages, they share an oral tradition about a common origin from an ancestral tribe. The timing of the separation for these tribes and history prior to their existence as separate groups is the subject of some debate. The migration started some time between AD 500 and 1673, and ended as late as 1718.

== Pre-separation ==
The Quapaw, the Ponca, the Omaha, the Osage and the Kaw share a tradition, that back in time they were one people. (Note: Attributed to multiple sources:) The claim is supported by similar tribal organization with kinship groups (clans) and closely related languages, although some of the tribes were widely scattered in historic time. (The Ponca and Omaha settled in Nebraska, the Kaw in Kansas, the Osage in Missouri, while Arkansas became the homeland of the Quapaw.)

The people in the initial tribe called themselves the Hoga. It translates "leaders", meaning the preceding generations or "ancestors". They lived in villages of bark houses, made pottery, hunted and gathered and raised a small amount of corn. According to tribal oral history collected by James Owen Dorsey, Alice Cunningham Fletcher, Omaha Indian Francis La Flesche and other interested people, the early Dhegiha people resided in the valley of the lower Ohio River.

This shared tradition has been controversial. As late as 1980, it was "generally rejected by professional archeologists". According to one theory, the tribes were longtime residents in the areas west of Mississippi River, where the whites encountered them. However, in 1993, Susan Vehik made a persuasive argument that the archaeology was less than definite, and that the oral histories of the existing Dhegihan nations would reconcile similarities with Mississippian phase cultures and lack of Caddoan features.

== Migration ==
For some reason the tribe started on a journey down Ohio River prior to 1673. The migration may have been an answer to a breakdown of the old culture, climatic changes unfavorable for corn growing, epidemics and/or conflicts with Iroquoian and Algonquin Indians.

While travelling, they lived in tents with the bottom of the cover secured with stones. Since the Hogas moved into new territory, the migration sometimes turned into an incursion.

There are differing chronologies for the migration, as seen below. It may be that some groups traveled ahead into the Missouri/Cahokia area as early as AD 500. Then the rest of the people came later, perhaps drawn by Cahokia. The breakup of Cahokia, and/or pressure from Eastern Natives, could have been the impetus to cross the Mississippi for good, and make the rest of the moves as detailed below. Alternatively, it could have been the breakup of Cahokia around 1250 that allowed the rest of the Dhegiha people to cross the Mississippi. Either way, the Osage, when making their last "movement" (across the Mississippi, to the Osage River) met other Dhegiha people, and added them to the tribe, making them the modern Osage of the time of the first contact with Europeans (The Osage history tells of meeting groups of people who spoke their language but acted differently, the Honga U-ta-non-dsi [Isolated Earth People] and the Tsi ha she [The Last to Come]).

=== First separation ===
Reaching the mouth of the Ohio River, the Hoga began crossing the Mississippi River in skin boats. The first separation occurred here. A part of the people either followed the Mississippi southward on the eastern shore or they drifted away with the current. They became the Quapaw, which means Downstream People. Those who went against the current of the river on the western shore became the Omaha or Upstream People.

Quapaw oral history describes that the first separation occurred at the confluence of the Mississippi and the Missouri Rivers. This was stated to Thomas Nuttall in the early 1800s as well as others. In addition, the Ponca also state this, see "Walks on the Earth" by Headman. Despite one ethnographer theorizing the separation was at the confluence on the Mississippi and the Ohio River, the location is very much up for the debate. It is likely that if all sources were reviewed, the majority of viable historic sources would point to the confluence of the Mississippi and Missouri as the location of initial Dhegiha and Quapaw separation.

The Quapaw tribe may have been encountered by Hernando De Soto near the Mississippi in 1541. However, the available evidence is contradictory (In 1938, the De Soto Commission concluded it was some Tunica Indians he encountered). Regardless of contradictions, the Quapaw Indians had recently settled in the Lower Mississippi area, when the French expedition of Jacques Marquette and Louis Jolliet encountered them in 1673 along the Mississippi River near the mouth of the Arkansas.

The Iowa Indians may have joined the Hogas and crossed the Mississippi with them. Other accounts state that the Iowa first met and joined the Indian migrants on the Lower Missouri or at a place on Des Moines River.

=== Upstream ===
The main body of the Hoga followed the Mississippi north. They would in time separate and become the Osage, Kaw, Omaha, and Ponca.

One account says the large group reached the mouth of the Missouri River and followed it. For a time, they lived in the area of present-day Gasconade County and Osage County, Missouri. Eventually, the people continued the journey and reached Osage River. Again, the group experienced a division. Disagreements over the division of animal sinews (used as threads and strings) caused this split. Some decided to explore the unknown country by way of Osage River and became respectively the Osage Indians and the Kaw or Kansa Indians. The Kaws may have gathered in a group, turned back, and followed the Missouri River north to Kansas River, where they settled.

Later, the Osage and the Quapaw in Arkansas turned into enemies despite the common origin. Also the Omaha in Nebraska would in time be considered hostile by the Osage.

The Omaha, walking away from the Osage/Kaw group in "an angry mood", kept traveling the southern banks of the Missouri. They crossed to the other shore at the mouth of Chariton River.

Two different routes to the pipestone quarry in Minnesota are put forward. One account claims the people first followed Chariton River and later Des Moines River (green route on the map). The other version has the people traveling up the Missouri River and apparently later the Big Sioux River (orange route on the map).

A more different migration story has the people going up the Mississippi instead of the Missouri (yellow route on the map). Standing on the shore of Des Moines River, they made up their mind to follow this tributary to its source. From here, they moved on and found the catlinite quarry.

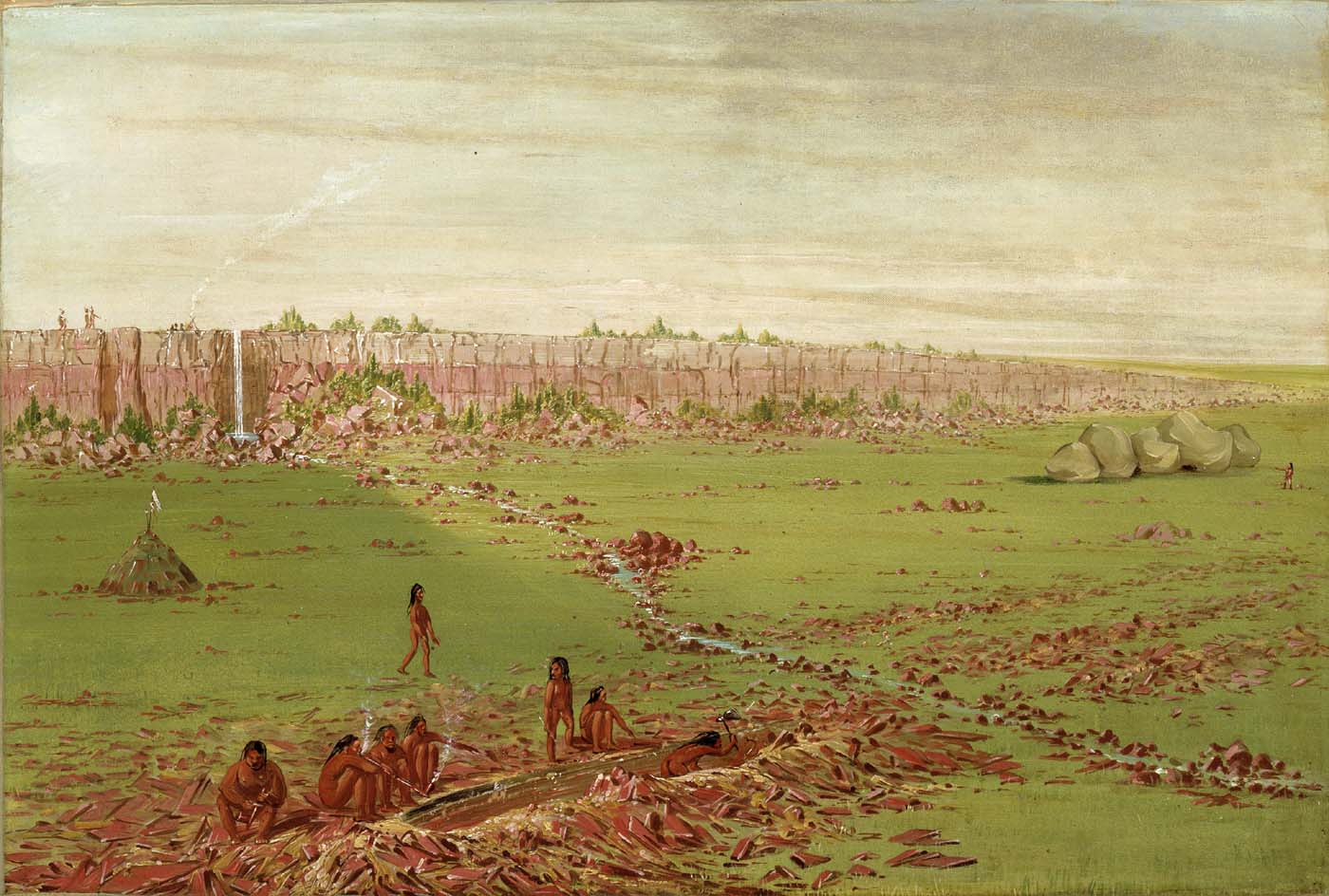
The Omaha battled with different Dakotas for ownership to the pipestone quarry in present Minnesota

=== Settlement near the Pipestone Quarry ===
The people found the red, workable catlinite in the area. They made the head to a sacred pipe of a big piece, later to become a part of the Ponca's tribal pipe. (The Ponca finished the long migration to northeastern Nebraska before they finally made the stem to the pipe).

The people built a village near Big Sioux River, maybe at the Blood Run Site in the northwestern Iowa. They came under attack from different groups of Sioux (Dakota) and abandoned the settlement after a major battle. The John K. Bear winter count of the lower Yanktonai Sioux says for the year 1685, "The Santee Dakota fought with the Omaha tribe". The many dead were buried in a wide mound near the village.

In 1879, Yankton Sioux chief Strikes-the-Ree ascribed the war to conflicting claims to the pipestone quarry.

=== On the move again ===
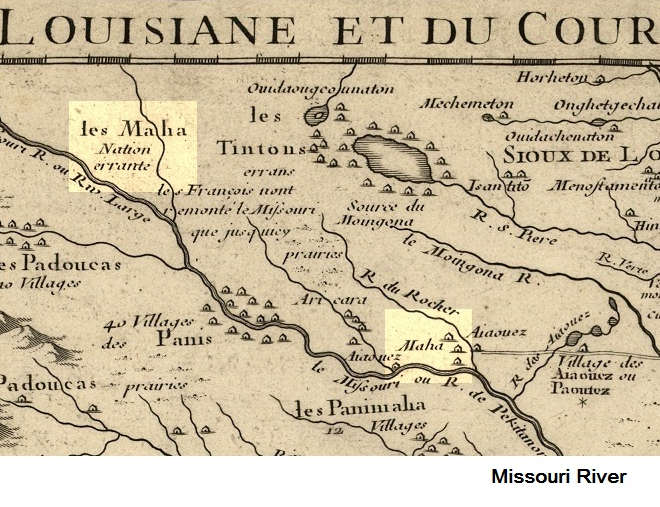
Detail of French cartographer De L'isle 1718 map with points of interest made light. Lower right: The villages of "Maha" (the Omaha Indians) extends up "R[iviere] du Rocher" or Rock River, assumed present-day Big Sioux River. On the east side of the river is an Iowa village. Upper left: "Les Omaha Nation errante" (The wandering Omaha Nation) moved around in present-day South Dakota. This may in fact be the separated Ponca, not yet recognized as a tribe in its own right

The people went south. Then, they seem to have headed north by following the Missouri upstream. They cut the wood to a sacred pole at a lake. Some Omahas, but not all, identified it as Lake Andes in South Dakota. This may have been sometime in the last quarter of the 17th century.

Probably, the people then moved back to a place near the mouth of the Big Sioux. Living east of the Missouri, they harassed the Arikara Indians residing on the western shores. In time, the Omaha settled in a new village on the Big Sioux and made peace here with the Arikara (and the Cheyenne and the Oto as well). The Arikara women taught the Omaha to build earth lodges.

The Big Sioux River village came under Indian attack. The Omaha, still followed by the Iowa, left the hostile area for good. All travel was yet on foot.

Information given by the Frenchman Pierre-Charles Le Sueur "strongly suggest" the presence of Omahas somewhere on the Upper Big Sioux at least before the end of the 17th century. After 1714, French sources locate the Omaha Indians other places.

=== The Ponca become a tribe ===
The Upstream People went north again and crossed the Missouri River at the mouth of White River in South Dakota. Some evidence point to a temporary halt of the migration here. It seems, the Ponca clan of the Omaha became more independent in the new surroundings. While it explored the land westward, either as a clan or as a distinct tribe, the rest of the Omahas and the Iowa stayed in the White River belt.

The Ponca made it to the Black Hills. They returned to the Omaha and the Iowa and the three groups began a joint journey down the Missouri.

The Ponca settled near the city of Niobrara, Nebraska. The Omaha and the Iowa continued downstream, but remained in the future state of Nebraska. This final and lasting split may have taken place between 1714 and 1718.

The Ponca would undertake long journeys from the villages to the Black Hills and even further west. On one trip to the Black Hills, they fought the "Padouca" - either Plains Apache or Comanche Indians. Later it came to a truce, and the Ponca received the first horses from the Padouca.

The whites mention the Ponca tribe for the first time in 1785. A Spanish document gives the Ponca homeland accurately as the northeastern corner of Nebraska.

== Post-separation ==
See Omaha people, Kaw people, Osage nation, Ponca, and Quapaw

== See also ==
- List of sites and peoples visited by the Hernando de Soto Expedition
