= Che-to-pah =

Osage Indian chief, warrior (c. 1810–1877)

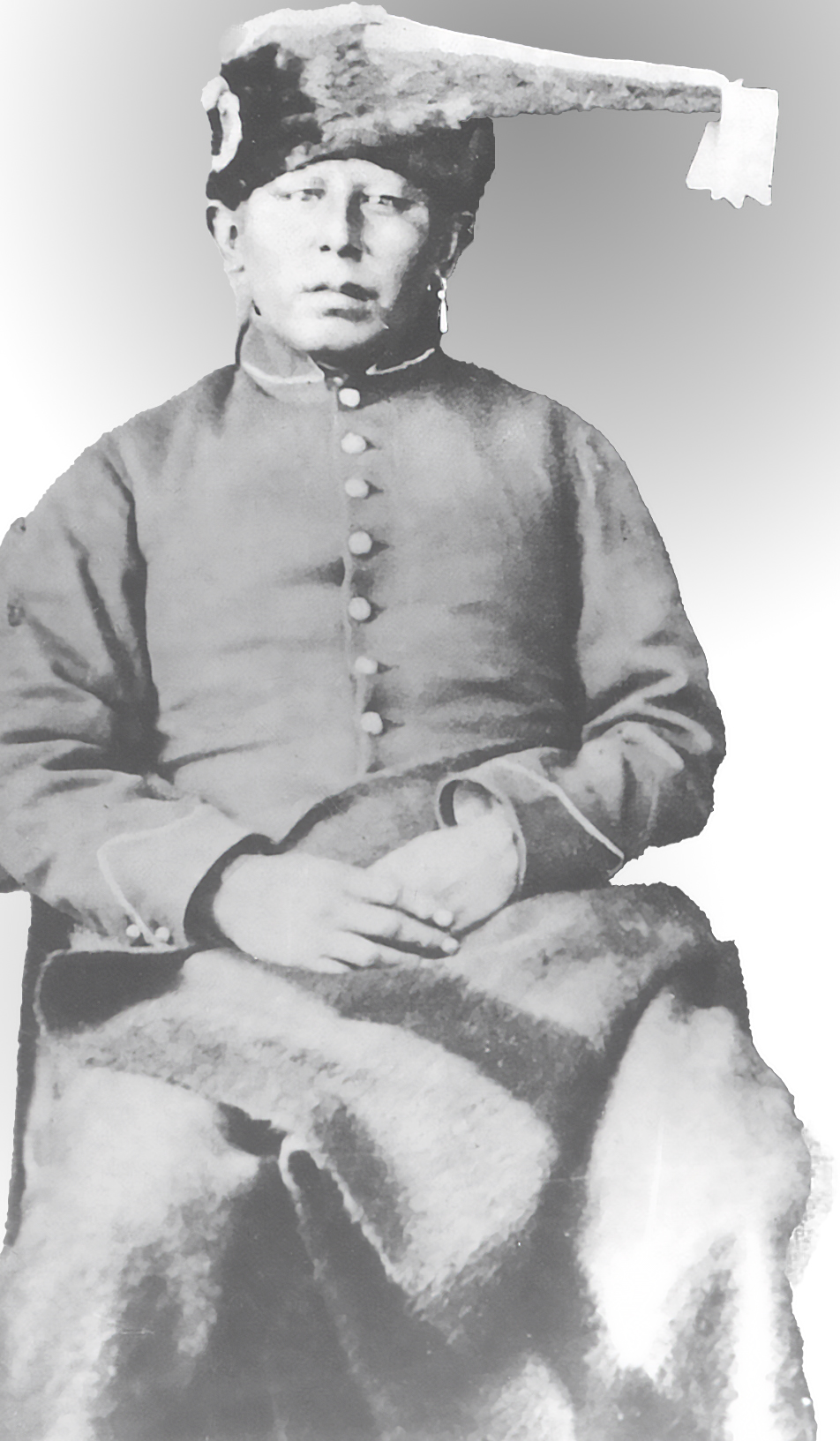
- Che-to-pah (Four Lodges), one of the senior Chiefs of the Little Osage Band
- Born: c. 1810
- Died: January 8, 1877 (aged 66–67)

Che-to-pah, also spelled Chetopah (Osage: Tse To pa; c. 1810–January 8, 1877), was an Osage chief counselor of the Little Osage band. His Osage name is also spelled Tzi-Topa. The city of Chetopa, Kansas was named for him. He was one of several principal figures during the tumultuous time on the Kansas frontier after the Civil War, with Che-to-pah leading his own band and living between the Verdigris River and Chetopa Creek in modern-day Wilson County, Kansas.

== Life ==
His name means "Four Lodges," an honorific that he earned after leading a war party in 1833 that killed every person inside four lodges of the Kiowa. Their scalps were taken, and their decapitated heads were left in buckets to send a warning to stay away from Osage territory and stop trading on the southern Platte River path. The Kiowa referred to 1833 as the "summer that they cut off their heads."

After the massacre the Osage made amends with the Kiowa, and Che-to-pah became a well-respected leader and political figure with the Osage Nation. Che-to-pah was a signer of the first Drum Creek Treaty in 1868 and the second one in 1870. It was during this time that Che-to-pah was living on the banks of the Verdigris River and had a town named after him, Chetopa, Kansas..

== Bluffing ==
In September 1862, Four Lodges went on the war path against Kickapoos— or that's what he told Indian Agent E. H. Carruth and a band of Delawares. Che-to-pah and his entire band of warriors were painted for war, riding ponies, and playing a war drum and flute. But they didn't attack when spotted. Agent Carruth and a group of Union soldiers tried to stop them from marching off to battle, imagining that they were going to do harm to the Delawares or to them. However, after talking with the warriors later, they realized that this was just a bluff. Apparently, Che-to-pah wanted word to spread that the Little Osages were on the war path to scare the Kickapoos enough to forgo the fall bison hunt and stay home. The Kickapoos weren't really the Osage's enemies, but the Osages didn't care for their poor hunting skills that scattered their favorite prey.

== Scalping party ==
In May 1873, a "mourning party" of scalp hunters attempted to find an "enemy" to scalp, a ritual part of the traditional mourning rituals of the Osage. The scalp was to be given to the son-in-law of White Swan, chief counselor to Chief Che-to-pah. The mourner was several months into the Osage mourning ritual, which could last months. He was the uncle of an Osage warrior named Wah-sah-she-wah-tain-kah who was tasked with obtaining the scalp. Col. Gould Hyde Norton, an eyewitness to the mourning, said in 1874 that the man mourned for his wife, while a later source says it was a son.

Wah-sah-she-wah-tain-kah and eight companions (including Bill Conner) went to the mouth of Turkey Creek on the Cimarron River and instead of discovering an enemy, they found the Principal Chief of the Wichita. The man they found was a friend of Principal Chief Joseph Pawnee-no-pashe named Chief Esadowa (or A-sah-wa). The Wichita were a peaceful tribe living on a nearby reservation; they were not at war with the Osage.

Wah-sah-she-wah-tain-kah, naked and painted black, found the chief unprepared for the unprovoked attack; however, Chief Esadowa was reportedly able to get an arrow ready to attempt to defend himself. While the chief fled on horseback, Wah-sah-she-wah-tain-kah shot him in the back with a gun. He and his companions decapitated the fallen chief, scalped him, and returned to the Osage reservation with the scalp. This incident sparked an investigation that would likely lead to war between the two tribes and the hanging of the perpetrator and potentially his associates.

The Indian agent for the Wichita passed the information to Indian Affairs Superintendent Enoch Hoag, who decided to put the murderers on trial and retribution paid to the Wichita. The Government notified Governor Joe of the demands, saying that the Great White Father was displeased; the governor decided to conduct a trial based on Indian rules.
