= Joseph Pawnee-no-pashe =

Principal Chief of the Osage Nation

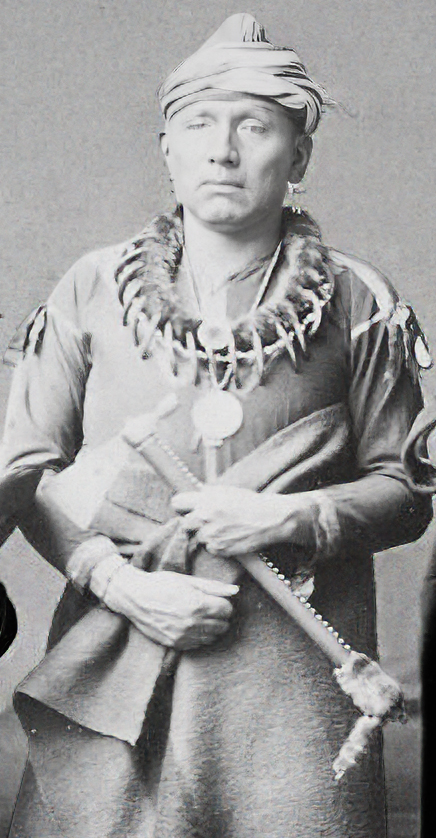
- Governor and Principal Chief Pawnee-no-pashe of the Osage

Osage Nation leader

Personal details
- Born: 1836/1837
- Died: January 18, 1883 Pawhuska, Oklahoma
- Party: Full Bloods
- Relations: Ne-kah-wah-she-tun-kah (brother)
- Parent: Paw-ne-no-pash-she (father)
- Education: Graduate of Osage Mission with English, French fluency
- Known for: Governor of the Great and Little Osages. Signing the Drum Creek Treaty.
- Nicknames: Governor Joe; Big Hill Joe

1st Principal Chief of the Osage Nation
- In office February 1882 – 1883
- Preceded by: Position established
- Succeeded by: Strike Axe

Governor of the Osage Nation
- In office 1876–1882
- Preceded by: Position established
- Succeeded by: Position disestablished

Joseph Pawnee-no-pashe (1836/1837 – January 18, 1883) was a chief of the Big Hills band of the Osage Indians. He won the first election of Principal Chief of the Osage Nation in 1882. In official documents he was also known as Joseph Paw-ne-no-Pa-she and Joseph Pre-ne-pro-pah-she. His Osage language name translates to "Not Afraid of Longhairs" or "Not Afraid of Pawnee", and he was informally known to whites as Big Hill Joe.

== Early life ==
Joseph Pawnee-no-pashe was born in 1836 or 1837 and was named Watchie-cha-hiche at birth. During his early years, the Osage mostly lived on the large Osage Reservation in present-day southeastern Kansas, often encamping along the upper Neosho River. They often hunted bison and other game in other parts of Kansas and present-day Oklahoma, as well. The Osage had been considered a partially civilized tribe for several decades by this time, having signed several treaties with the United States and other Indian tribes and only occasionally fighting battles.

Joseph's father was a well-respected Osage war chief, also named Paw-ne-no-pash-she, who enrolled his son in the Catholic mission school in Kansas at age 11 in 1848. He was educated under the school run by Father John Schoenmakers at the Osage Mission's post. A Jesuit priest there, Father Paul Mary Ponziglione, said that the father's name meant "Pawnees – Two I Killed." In Ponziglione's telling of the story, this name could only be acquired by the Osage youth, named Joseph Watchie-cha-hiche at the time, by performing the same deed as his father:

Now when young Joseph assumed the chieftancy of his father's band, he went to the Plains in quest of two Pawnee scalps. We are indebted to Father Paul for a vivid description of the triumphant return of Joseph with two bloody scalps hanging from his belt as evidence of his right to bear the name of his father, Paw-ne-no-pesh-she. By this name he was known ever after.

Watchie-cha-hiche had been christened Joseph in 1848 during his baptism by the Reverend Father Bax, while the scalping had occurred around 1860 on the cusp of the Civil War. Joseph had attended the Osage Manual Labor School for about 12 years when he graduated, with his former teacher remembering him as "a good student" and "quick to learn."

Joseph Pawnee-no-pashe had a brother named Ne-kah-wah-she-tun-kah. After Joseph became governor, his brother became a hereditary chief of the Big Hill band by around the time of the Fort Smith Council. When he died in 1923, Ne-kah-wah-she-tun-kah was given a traditional Osage burial, including the use of a human scalp.

Joseph became an articulate and literate but refused to assimilate the Western European culture when it did not benefit him or the people whom he led. Joseph Paw-ne-no-pashe "returned to the blanket" later in life and rejected his earlier Catholic indoctrination. His popularity with the Osage would lead to easy election victories to the office of Governor later in life.

Father Ponziglione reported that the Civil War had apparently given Joseph a form of atavism, inducing him to forgo many Western habits, return to the staff of life (buffalo hunting), return to the blanket for dress, and take four wives.

== Treaties and leadership ==
Joseph Paw-ne-no-pashe was a late signatory of the Canville Treaty that sprang out of the Fort Smith Council. It was originally signed by other Osage leaders in 1865, but during ratification by the U.S. Government from 1865 to 1866, it was returned to the Osages with amendments that Joseph witnessed as an English-speaking Osage. This treaty established an Osage Diminished Reserve in southern Kansas and provided for the sale of a large amount of land at $1.25 per acre to U.S. settlers. The Canville Treaty decreased the land holdings of the Osage enormously, leading to disgruntlement of the Osage half-breeds who had cabins and cultivated lands on the banks of the Neosho River. Settlers continued to encroach upon their lands, a process accelerated by the end of the Civil War.

In 1868, the U.S. Indian Commissioner appointed Joseph Governor of the Great and Little Osage Nation of Indians. This led to disagreement with the old-timer White Hair VI, then the Principal Chief of the Osage, who would not negotiate with the United States over land. The appointment of a governor had no immediate effect in breaking the hereditary nature of the principal chief. But when White Hair VI died on December 24, 1869, it left Joseph the de facto supreme chief of the nation and the one who would serve as the leader of treaty negotiations.

The encroachment of settlers in Osage lands in Kansas became a huge problem by 1867. In 1868, a sketchy land deal was developed by a railroad company to acquire the Osage Diminished Reserve lands in southern Kansas by using the Indian Commissioners led by Nathaniel Green Taylor to secure a new treaty. The treaty was shot down repeatedly by Osage leaders, including Joseph. Through threats and several strong-arm tactics, the commissioners forced the Osages to sign the first Drum Creek Treaty on May 27, 1868.

The tribe reluctantly approved him as governor in spring 1870, breaking the hereditary rule of the principal chiefs of the Osage that ended with White Hair. This marked the transition to balloting for the election of tribal leaders.

Joseph was elected in 1872 to succeed himself, and again in 1876 and 1878, gaining the endearing term "Governor Joe".

He was the best-educated Osage Indian signatory at the 1870 signing of the Drum Creek Treaty in Kansas.

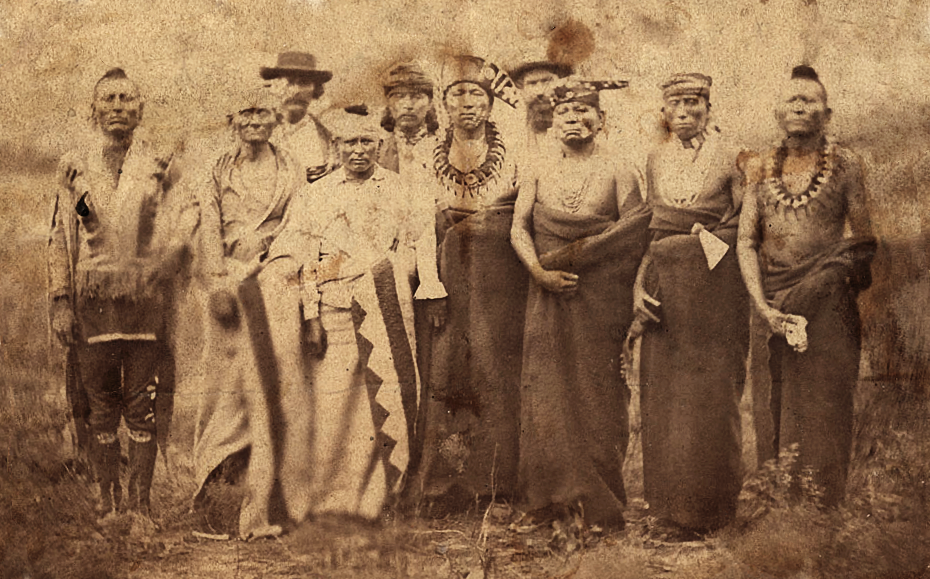
Big Hill Joe (center) wearing a bear claw necklace and blanket, 1865, during the Fort Smith Council. Joseph would eventually sign the treaty that developed from this conference.

The treaty was not entirely popular with the Osage, but it was an inevitable end to the conflict with white Americans. During negotiations, an Osage chief who, suspicious of the intentions of the American delegation, spoke against the signing of the treaty that would send thousands of them to a reservation:

I remember one Indian orator [...] got up and spoke of Treaties they had with the Great Father in Washington, in the past, and how they once owned all the land north of the Red River of the South, and west of the Mississippi, and south of the Missouri River, and, to prove that, he brought out a tin cylinder a finely engrossed Treaty, signed by President Thomas Jefferson in 1804. (Note: This was referring to the Treaty of Fort Clark of 1808, but since the signed document was from 1804, it was from the time in which Lewis and Clark brought Osage chiefs to meet President Jefferson, the legendary Great Father. Commissioners determined that the elaborate "treaty" was signed by the Secretary of War in 1804, Henry Dearborn.)

[...]

He then said they had lost all that land, and now they came down to take away the last land they had.

— John V. Farwell, Jr., who witnessed this speech as an 11-year old

Chief Joseph demanded the right to hunt buffalo outside the borders of the new reservation and they be given the right to set up their own laws of trespass. He also wanted tribal ownership instead of individual land ownership.

However, the Americans convinced the Osage to ratify it and on September 10, 1870, it was signed by Chief Joseph who could speak and write English and several other languages. He was one of very few Indians and half-breeds who signed the treaty with his own handwriting.

The signing was attended by Chicago dry goods merchant John V. Farwell, the founder of John V. Farwell & Co., as an Indian commissioner. In 1936, his son named John V. Farwell, Jr. would write of his experience at the treaty signing. Other attendees to the treaty were his brother Ne-ka-wah-shin too-kah, a Quaker missionary named John D. Lang, and the Quaker artist Vincent Colyer.

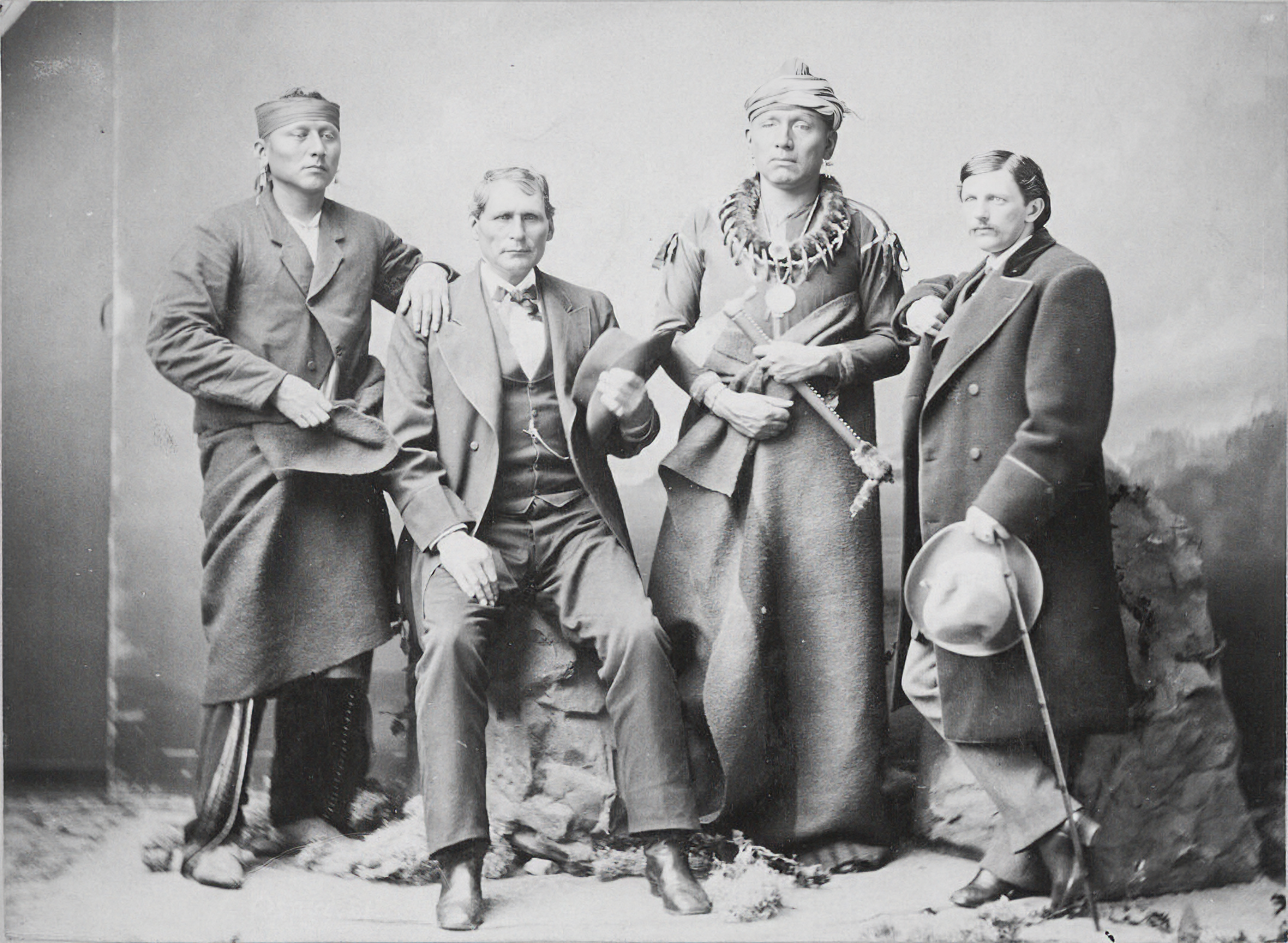
Left to right: Chief Black Dog II, Augustus Captaine, Osage Governor Joseph Paw-ne-no-Pas-he, and Colonel John H. Florer. Florer was a merchant living amongst the Osage in Gray Horse, Oklahoma, while the others were prominent Osage Indians.

The treaty provided that the remainder of Osage lands in Kansas be sold, and the proceeds used to relocate the tribe to Indian Territory in the Cherokee Outlet. They sold their lands to the "peace" administration of President Ulysses S. Grant, for which they received $1.25 per acre.

Chief Joseph addressed the Indian Commissioners and agent Isaac T. Gibson and wished it be transcribed and sent to Washington:

Since the Treaty of 1804 the Osages have been in peace with the white man. Every time the President has wanted it, we have sold him our homes. [...] And what have I to show for it? Not one cent. The land that we have given to our Great Father is still there, but what we have received is all gone. My chiefs are all dead. They died without any money - died naked. I have never received anything from them for what they have taken from me. The white man has taken our timber and land. He might just as well have taken the money out of my hand.[...]

We could not until now come to one mind, We are well pleased with the price. My people have confidence in your commissioners. One of you have promised to see the Great Father, and we hope you will. [...] We leave our lands in trust with the United States, and all lands not sold in ten years we will claim.

== Osage Nation reservation ==
This trust was not well-placed, as rumors spread by newspapers soon led to bloodshed on the Kansas-Indian Territory border. After negotiations by Joseph with Cherokee Chief Dennis Bushyhead and the U.S. government, the Osage moved onto their reservation and began to settle in late 1870. However, their food crops did not provide all of their sustenance, and so many of them were dependent on the dwindling buffalo herds for food.

=== Ritual killings in 1873 ===
On January 28, 1873, Colonel Gould Hyde Norton of the Kansas militia, a white man who had founded the nearby town of Arkansas City and ran a store, was taking shelter during a snowstorm at the Osage's "Big Hill camp of the Salt Plains." He had arrived at the end of treaty negotiations between the Osage and Pawnee, their longtime enemies. Norton was enlisted to pen the words of the treaty: "We pledge ourselves and good will at all time and to live together as loving brethren henceforth forever." The treaty also stipulated that they "agree to abstain from molesting each other by acts of murder, theft, or any other unfriendliness or violence." Norton encountered Bill Conner, who stated that a copy of the signed treaty was to be sent to Superintendent Enoch Hoag for archival. The Pawnee left, but mentioned that there was a straggler Pawnee warrior hunting nearby.

The day after the completion of the Osage-Pawnee Treaty, in a separate event unconnected to the Pawnee, the wife of Bill Conner (a half-breed Osage and interpreter for the same) was murdered during childbirth. Conner and the woman were both fluent in English and had been educated at Osage Mission's Post, Kansas. The widower was pressured by young Osage men to do a ritual killing of a Pawnee as a way to mourn the loss of his wife and child. The Pawnee Nation had told the Osage about the warrior to protect him, not to make him the target of a scalping. Seventy armed men, painted black, mounted their horses and rode north to take the lone Pawnee man. They returned the following day with his scalp on a lance in a triumphant show of their prize. His severed hand was on a separate lance. The scalp became the center of the funeral dance for Mrs. Conner, joining other Pawnee scalps from years before.

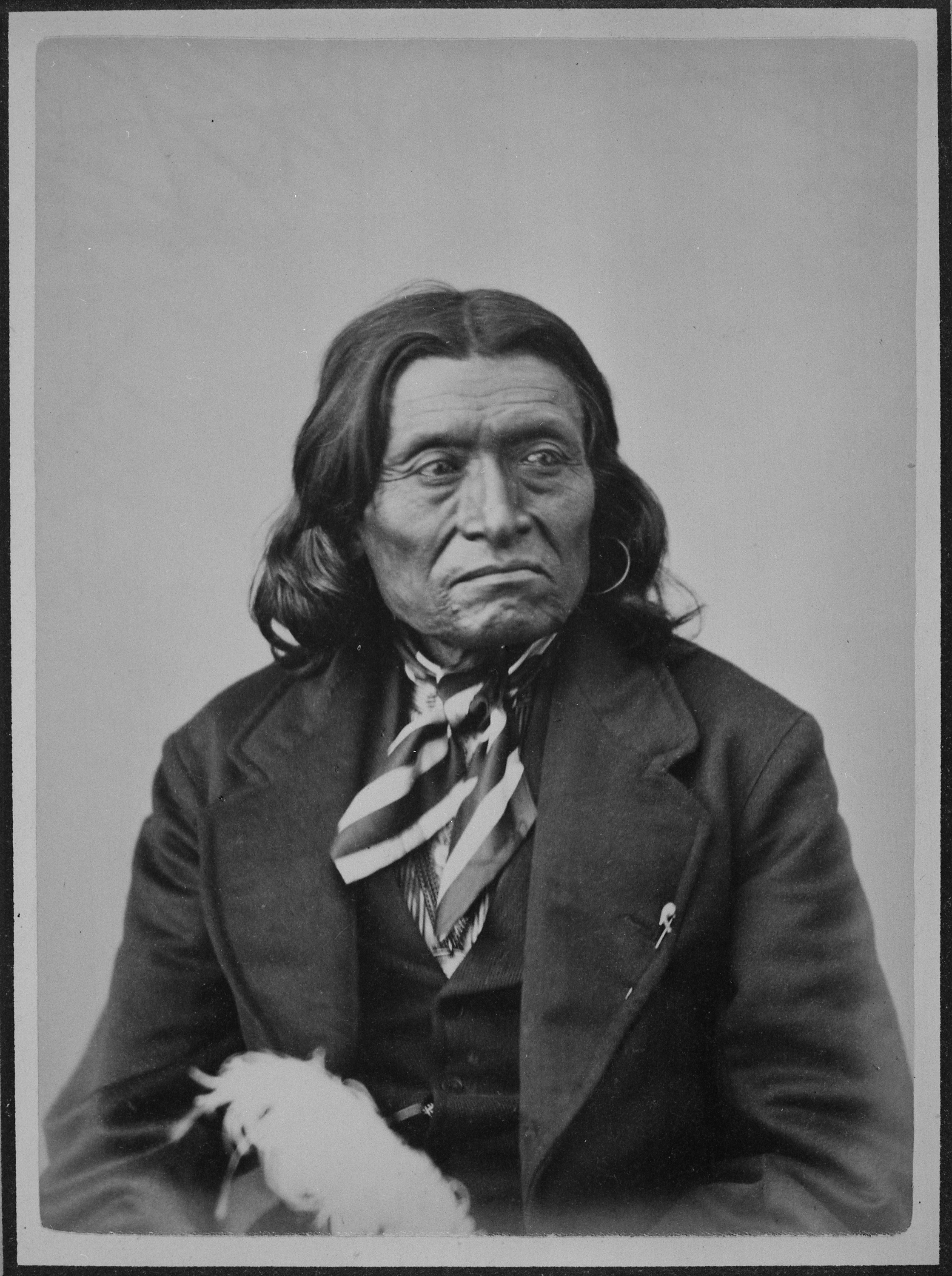
Chief Esadowa, 1872. Governor Joe argued that this man's life and scalp were taken at the direction of the Great Spirit and with no murderous intent. He was shot in the back, beheaded, and scalped by an Osage warrior in 1873.

The February scalp dance was repeated over several days, and then Che-she-wa-ta-in-ka of the Little Osages band borrowed it for their own dance ritual, as witnessed by Colonel Norton. Their interpreter, Eawaska, regretted that the scalp was on loan and vowed to get one for their band. This would happen in May, the story of which is part of a legend in which the Chief of the Wichita was murdered for the same reason as the Pawnee warrior in February.

In May 1873, a "mourning party" of scalp hunters attempted to find an "enemy" to scalp, a ritual part of the traditional mourning rituals of the Osage. The scalp was to be given to the son-in-law of White Swan, chief counselor to Chief Che-to-pah. The mourner was several months into the Osage mourning ritual, which could last months. He was the uncle of an Osage warrior named Wah-sah-she-wah-tain-kah who was tasked with obtaining the scalp. Col. Gould Hyde Norton, an eyewitness to the mourning, said in 1874 that the man mourned for his wife, while a later source says it was a son.

Wah-sah-she-wah-tain-kah and eight companions (including Bill Conner) went to the mouth of Turkey Creek on the Cimarron River and instead of discovering an enemy, they found the Principal Chief of the Wichita. The man they found was a friend of Governor Joe named Chief Esadowa (or A-sah-wa). The Wichita were a peaceful tribe living on a nearby reservation; they were not at war with the Osage.

Wah-sah-she-wah-tain-kah, naked and painted black, found the chief unprepared for the unprovoked attack; however, Chief Esadowa was reportedly able to get an arrow ready to attempt to defend himself. While the chief fled on horseback, Wah-sah-she-wah-tain-kah shot him in the back with a gun. He and his companions decapitated the fallen chief, scalped him, and returned to the Osage reservation with the scalp. This incident sparked an investigation that would likely lead to war between the two tribes and the hanging of the perpetrator and potentially his associates.

The Indian agent for the Wichita passed the information to Indian Affairs Superintendent Enoch Hoag, who decided to put the murderers on trial and retribution paid to the Wichita. The Government notified Governor Joe of the demands, saying that the Great White Father was displeased; the governor decided to conduct a trial based on Indian rules.

=== The trial for the scalping party that killed the Principal Chief of the Wichita ===
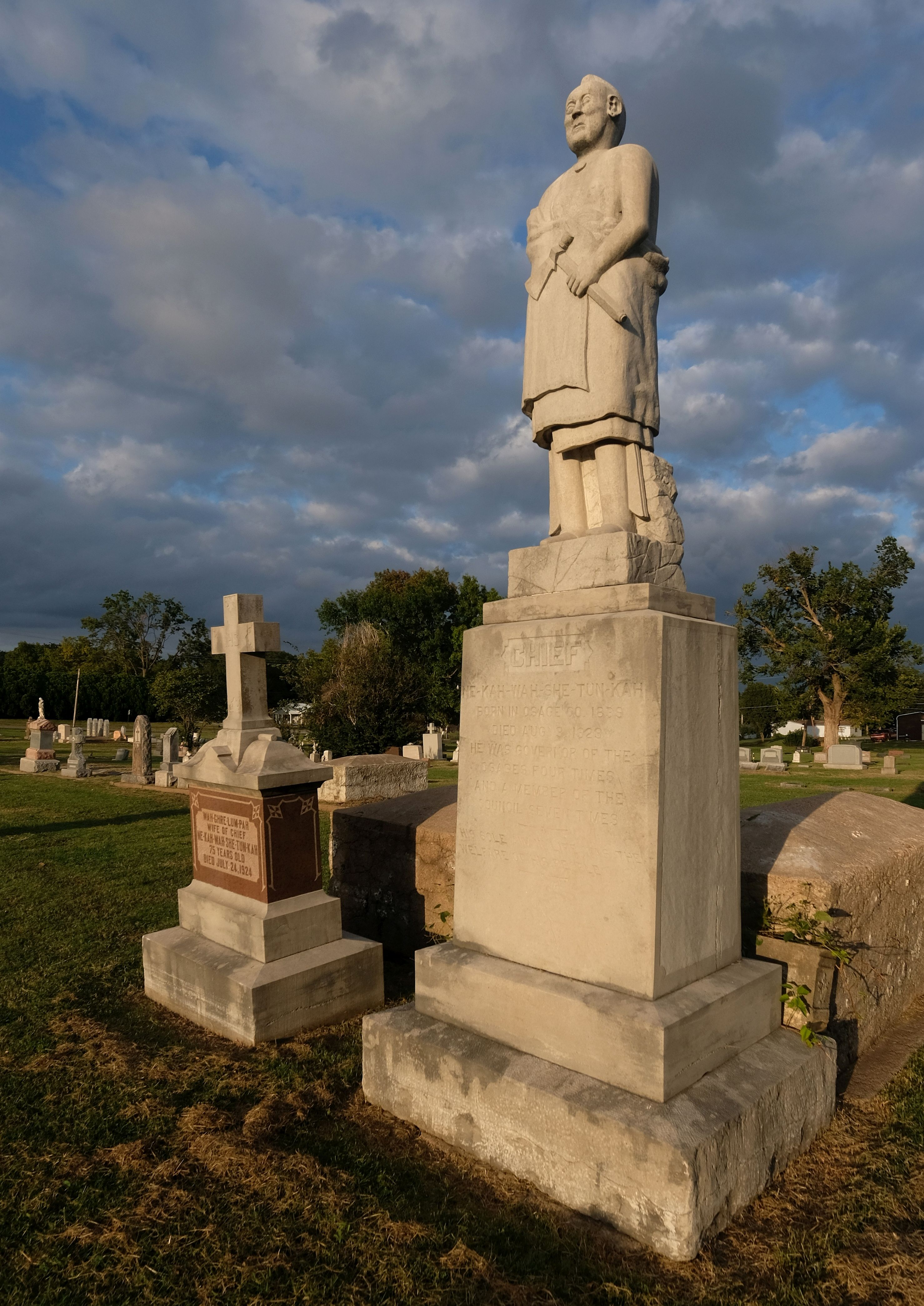
Chief Nick's tomb (behind the statue) contains the scalp of Joe's friend and Principal Chief of the Wichita, Esadowa.

At an 1873 gathering of the Osage for the U.S. government to distribute treaty funds and annuities, a trial was held concerning the murder. The trial had been demanded by the impromptu arrival at the Osage's meeting of the Wichita chief's brother and a delegation of fifty warriors. The Wichita chief's brother vowed to declare war and brand the Osage "traitors and assassins" if they did not acquiesce to a trial of the accused.

However, instead of putting individuals of the mourning party on trial and in danger of hanging, the Osage Nation itself took responsibility and the scalper was not named, saying that the offense was not a murder but an appropriate religious exercise. Governor Joe, Chief Hard Rope, Chief Che-to-pah, and two Cherokee lawyers defended the Osage, while the Wichita were represented by their chiefs including the brother of the slain Principal Chief Esadowa. After a heated debate with both sides stonewalling and lengthy consultations, Governor Joe finally acquiesced to the demands of the Wichita, permitting them to receive reparations of approximately $1,500 (consisting of $2 per family, 6 horses, and $300 in merchandise). The Governor blamed the events on the Great Spirit and obedience to his will.

The government's representative used the opportunity to make the scalping very unpopular by ensuring each family head understood the amount of money it cost him in annuity money ("two dollars to the Wichita"), money that could have gone to food during a year of poor crop output due to drought and grasshoppers. War was averted thanks to the leadership of Governor Joseph Pawnee-no-pashe and the lawyers, and the tribes vowed to end their scalping for bounties. The Wichita chief's scalp would reappear 50 years later in the 1923 burial ceremony for Chief Joe's brother, Ne-kah-wah-she-tun-kah, the last traditional Osage funeral ceremony to include such a relic.

=== Further conflicts ===
Any amount of Indian activity became a concern for the Kansas settlers who replaced the Osage. Not all Osage left Kansas in 1870, risking their ability to join the reservation at a later date. The tardy removal of some Indians caused white settlers to forcefully oust them. They were all removed except one holdout by 1874.

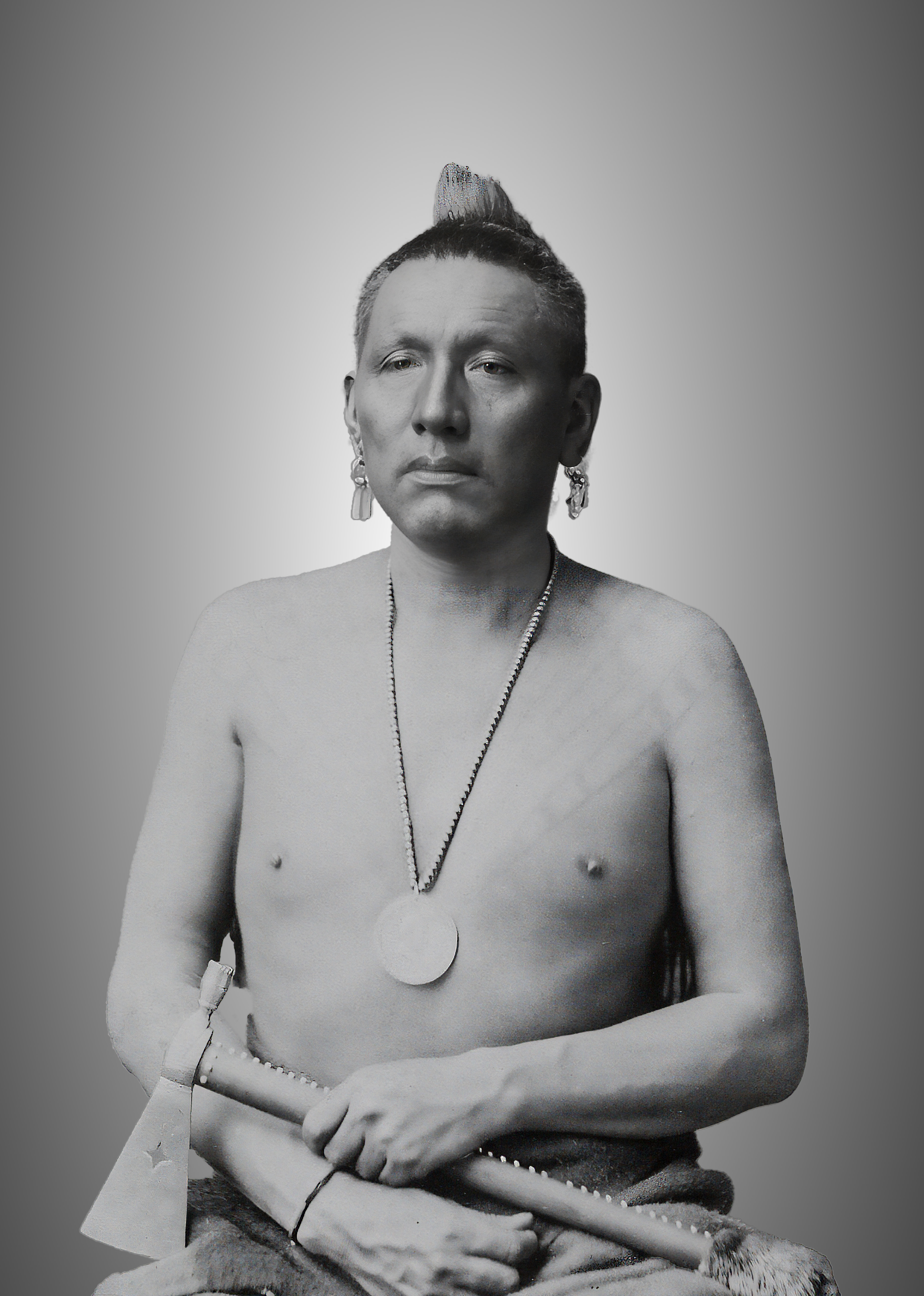
Joseph wearing his Indian Peace Medal. His name is written Pá-yin nun-pá-shi, He who Fears-not-the-sight-of-a-Pawnee, on the back of this photo. He is listed as 6 feet (1.8 m) tall with a "large and commanding physique."

In March 1874, twelve Osage Indian chiefs with Joseph as their leader traveled to Washington, D.C. with the Indian agent Gibson to see President Grant.

In August 1874, a party of self-appointed militiamen encountered a small band of Osage on a hunting party in southern Kansas. They began to disarm some of the men, but several escaped and were shot. The remainder fled to the Indian reservation and reported the incident. The white men scalped two of the Osage they killed. When the militia reported the event and put the blame on the Osage, the governor of Kansas Thomas A. Osborn declared war on the Osage and asked the U.S. government for aid and weapons. Osborn appoints Colonel Gould Hyde Norton of Arkansas City the local militia leader to try and stop the Osage, supposedly on the warpath. The militia organizations asked for guns, ammunition, and rations— perhaps a bit too conveniently due to the drought, grasshoppers, and cost of food at that time.

Chief Joseph Pawnee-no-pashe and fellow Osage leader Chief Hard Rope wrote to Superintendent Enoch Hoag about the evidence of the attack: the Osage had been attacked by the roaming posse of Kansans from Medicine Lodge, Kansas. The 29 men, women, and children had been hunting buffalo in southern Kansas. The skirmish killed five of them, all because rumors and famine had driven the men of Kansas to imagine an Indian uprising.

Although the "border war" had been a complete fabrication by Kansans who wanted to get free rations from the government for Indian patrols, the ploy worked. From 1875 onward, the Osage remained on their reservation and did not go on hunting parties. On December 31, 1874, the Bureau of Indian Affairs reiterated its policy that prevented Indians from going off the reservation without a note from their agent and military escort. The Osage would have to adapt to a more sedentary life, the kind of life the U.S. government had always wanted them to lead.

== Later life and death ==
After several tenures as governor, the Osage Nation's first self-governing system and constitution were established, with Governor Joe and 14 other chiefs signing the document. Pawnee-no-pashe then became the first elected principal chief of the Osage Nation in February 1882, a title vacant since White Hair had died in 1869. Principal Chief Joseph died a few months before the final deed was transferred from the Cherokee Nation to the Osage Nation on June 14, 1883.

In 1960, a red granite memorial monument with his likeness and biography was erected at the Pawhuska City Cemetery with a dedication ceremony, with author and historian John Joseph Mathews speaking before a large crowd that included descendants of Joseph Pawnee-no-pashe and his brother Ne-kah-wah-she-tun-kah.

== Notes ==
Political offices
New title	1st Principal Chief of the Osage Nation; February 1882 – 1883	Succeeded by Strike Axe
New title	Governor of the Osage Nation; 1876–1882	Position disestablished
