= Chetopa =

Chetopa may refer to:

- Chetopa, Kansas, a city in LaBette County, Kansas
- Chetopa Creek, a stream in Kansas
- Chetopa Township, Wilson County, Kansas
