= Drum Creek Treaty =

1868 unratified treaty between the United States and Osage

Coordinates: 37.197302°N 95.631569°W

The Drum Creek Treaty was an Osage-United States agreement signed in 1870 that came about from the controversy over the Sturges Treaty of 1868. (Note: Named for William Sturges, president of the Leavenworth, Lawrence, & Galveston Railroad Company.) The Sturges Osage Treaty was a treaty negotiated between the United States and the Osage Nation in 1868. The 1868 treaty was fraught with controversy, and so was never ratified. The Drum Creek Treaty of 1870 was designed to fix the problems of the earlier treaty; it was ratified upon its signing by Osage leaders in the same location as the earlier one.

There is some confusion over the name of the Drum Creek Treaty since there were two signed there. The first one, signed in 1868, was later referred to as the Sturges (sometimes misspelled as Sturgis) Treaty. It was never ratified due to the dissatisfaction of the Osages who had signed it and significant number of the white citizens of Kansas. The second Drum Creek Treaty, signed and ratified in 1870, was a significant treaty that moved all Osage Indians out of the State of Kansas into modern-day Oklahoma.

The treaties arose out of a growing need to relocate the Osage to a new reservation. In 1868, the Osages were still allotted a strip of land mostly in the State of Kansas known as the Osage Diminished Reserve. It had been diminished recently by the Canville Treaty signed on September 29, 1865. The Diminished Osage Reserve was 30 miles north-south and about 240 miles east-west. Recently ceded lands (i.e. Osage Trust Lands) were in the process of being sold to white settlers, the proceeds to be kept in trust by the U.S for the Osages to buy other lands in Indian Territory.

== Background ==
Between 1808 and 1865, ten treaties were made between the Osage Nation and the United States. The June 2, 1825 treaty signed at St. Louis, Missouri relinquished large amounts of land in Arkansas, Missouri, and Kansas Territory, reserving a 50-mile wide strip of land mostly in southern Kansas. Its east-west extent was ambiguous, but was considered to be about 270 miles on maps of the era.

This was Osage land for thirty years, the Osage Reservation. The Territory of Kansas (est. 1854) and then the State of Kansas (est. 1861) would envelop this reservation during those thirty years.

White settlers had established farmsteads on Osage lands in the early to mid-19th century. Their growing presence during the Bleeding Kansas era before the American Civil War and then the post-war migration pressure was instrumental in the decline of Osage control in Kansas. After the war, white settlers infiltrated first other Indian reservations and, eventually, Osage lands.

=== Canville Treaty of 1865 ===
Dennis N. Cooley, the United States Commissioner of Indian Affairs, began talks with the Osage and several other Indian tribes at the Fort Smith Council in September 1865, purposely ignoring their previous agreements at the Camp Napoleon Council where tribes pledge to stop warring with one another. The primary concern for the U.S. was to remove Indians to Indian Territory and out of Kansas, Nebraska, and Wisconsin, but Cooley also pushed for the complete renegotiation of treaties for tribes which had fought for the Confederacy and the establishment of a consolidated tribal government.

The Canville Treaty of 1865 required that the United States sell the Osage lands in Kansas, the Osage Trust Lands, at $1.25 per acre ($3.09/ha) (equivalent to $26 in 2025) and then purchase new lands in Oklahoma using the proceeds from the sale. Even before these sales, white settlers attempted to preempt the official sales and occupy the best farmsteads.

The 1865 treaty also ceded lands on the eastern edge where many Osages lived, a 30 by 50 mile parcel which included their Neosho River lands and the log cabins built by Osage half-breeds. The 1865 Canville treaty left the Osages with a strip only 30 miles wide, known as the Osage Diminished Reserve. It was about 240 miles wide wast-west. The Osages had to move from their Neosho River properties to the banks of the Verdigris River, forcing settler ("civilized") half-breeds to rebuild. The ceded lands on the east were to be exchanged for $300,000 cash from the U.S. government and a trust fund for the rest. Due to a breakdown in language between the Osage language and English and a serious error by the Indian commissioners, the sale of some of the trust lands produced an excess that went into a "Civilization Fund," a slush fund that would accumulate $776,931.58 and be shared by over 100 Indian tribes and former slaves.

The Osages would come to understand the Article 1 slush fund problem and attempt to be compensated for the error. However, the 1868 treaty would be even worse.

White settlers infiltrated Osage lands at such a rate that the tribe requested U.S. military assistance to help turn them back in 1867.

The Canville Treaty made a lot of settled Osages leave their homes of several years or decades along the Neosho and move to the Verdigris River to the west. The Little Osages, for example, moved to spots along the Fall River and Chetopa Creek where they meet the Verdigris. All of the Osages were then out of reach of the old Osage Mission's post where Jesuit missionaries had overseen a ministry and school that serviced many of them.

=== The first Drum Creek Treaty, also known as the Sturges Treaty ===
The Sturges Treaty of 1868 sought to modify the Canville Treaty by proposing to sell the 8,000,000-acre (32,000 km^{2}) Osage Diminished Reserve to the Leavenworth, Lawrence, & Galveston Railroad Company directly, at a price of 20 to 25 cents per acre. These terms were unfavorable to the Osages, and the chiefs refused its terms. The commissioner began pressure to have them sign the treaty to help out the railroads involved. One tactic used an appointed committee of Osages, but they failed to approve the treaty. Bribes were ineffective. Another tactic used a potentially false report of a murder at the hand of Osages near present-day Medicine Lodge, Kansas.

Burns reports that the Osages present and debating the treaty were Joseph Pawnee-no-pashe and:

Twelve o’clock, Che-to-pah (Tze To pa [Four Lodges]), Hard Rope, No-pa-wah-la (No pa Walla [Thunder Fear]), Big Elk (O pon Tun ka), Wah-ti-um-ka (probably Wa ti An ka [Dry Plume]), Kou-e-ce-gla (unidentified), Wa-ho-ta-she (probably Loud Clear Voice), Drum, White Hair VI, Forked Horn, No-kah-kah-he (unidentified), and one other.

The Osages inexplicably signed the treaty on May 27, 1868. Burns believes it was due to chicanery on the part of the Indian Commissioner,

Solomon Markham, a resident of the land previously owned by the Osage, swore that the Drum Creek (Sturges) Treaty was:

a fraud upon the people of Kansas and the whole country; that the said treaty works deep injustice to a large number of worthy and industrious people who have located their homes and families upon the said lands ...[giving several reasons] ... and that the said treaty was executed in fraud of the settlers, the Indians, the people of Kansas and the whole country, and various other railway companies, who offered more for the lands than did the said Sturges & Co.

George Henry Hoyt, Attorney General of the State of Kansas swore that:

Gross deceit was practiced upon the said Osage Indians by the said commissioners; that the said Indians were informed or caused to be informed by the said commissioners that the United States would not protect them, or give them their presents or annuities, unless they consented to sign the particular treaty brought by them from Washington; that other inducements were held out to the said Indians, and among others, the promise to secure peace between them and their enemies, the Arapahoes.

Chief Che-to-pah told U.S. Representative Sidney Clarke in 1869 that the Osages had been deceived by the government representatives of the Sturges Treaty, and they were opposed to ratification. John S. Gilmore called it

a premeditated, thoroughly planned and successfully executed fraud from its incipiency up to the stage of its submission to the United States Senate for ratification. It was even more — a brazen steal, so extensive as to be infamous — and the officials, politicians and leading men who approved or aided and abetted in the attempt to carry it out deserved to be buried so deep under popular obloquy that they would never again publically [sic] show their head.

The settlers, along with lobbying members of the House and Senate, strongly opposed the Sturges Treaty and were largely responsible for its failure. The sole Kansas Congressional Representative, Sidney Clarke, opposed it vehemently.

By 1869, the Osages were desperate for a new treaty. The 1868 treaty had failed to pass, the white settlers were squatting on their Diminished Reserve expecting it to soon be available, settlers were stealing their ponies and destroying their property, annuity payments were not being made timely by the U.S. Government according to treaty, and the payments that were received were not in cash.

The Osage would, however, come to an agreement with the United States that restored the terms of the Canville Treaty of 1865. It was, oddly enough, not technically a treaty: it was an Act of Congress (an appropriations bill) that was agreed to by signatories of the Osage and witnessed by representatives of the Indian Commission.

== The Drum Creek Treaty of 1870 ==
The U.S. Representative from Kansas, Sidney Clarke submitted an Indian appropriation bill in January 1870. The bill would open up white settlement to the Osage Diminished Reserve at $1.25 per acre. The bill was amended by Maine Senator Lot Morrill in June, conforming it to the 1865 treaty obligations. After threatening Congress to pass the bill before summer recess, it passed and received President Grant's signature, authorizing the removal of the Osages to a new reservation to be later purchased in Indian Territory (present-day Oklahoma). It allotted school lands to Kansas and directed Osages to begin negotiations for removal.

Agent Gibson, in Washington during the passage of the bill, was sent to Kansas to begin the Drum Creek Council. The Drum Creek Treaty of 1870 would immediately follow.

One of the main points needed to finalize the treaty was the situation of white settlers in the Cherokee Outlet. The 1870 Census had just been taken, and several hundred families had been found there. The Osages would not move there unless there was an exclusive right to the land and a right of trespass.

President Grant's administration dealt with the Osages in a much better way than earlier treaties; it fixed the shortcomings of the 1868 Drum Creek fiasco while solving the problem of the Civilization Fund. To head off ratification issues, Congress and the President passed and "ratified" the "treaty" before it was sent to the Osages. This prevented meddling by Commissioners, translators, and railroad tycoons. New commissioners were appointed. Gifts were offered. The terms were favorable to the Osages. All the Osages had to do was sign, and the terms of the treaty would immediately take effect.

The so-called treaty was contained in an Act of Congress with the short title "Indian Expenses Appropriations," shown below: The Act of July 15, 1870 – Removal of Osage from Kansas - 16 Stat. 335, Chapter 296

SEC. (12.)

And be it further enacted, That whenever the Great and Little Osage Indians shall agree thereto, in such manner as the President shall prescribe, it shall be the duty of the President to remove said Indians from the State of Kansas to lands provided or to be provided for them for a permanent home in the Indian Territory, to consist of a tract of land in compact form equal in quantity to one hundred and sixty acres [65 ha] for each member of said tribe, or such part thereof as said Indians may desire, to be paid for out of the proceeds of the sales of their lands in the State of Kansas, the price per acre for such lands to be procured in the Indian Territory not to exceed the price paid or to be paid by the United States for the same. And to defray the expenses of said removal, and to aid in the subsistence of the said Indians during the first year, there is hereby appropriated out of the treasury, out of any money not otherwise appropriated, to be expended under the direction of the Secretary of the Interior, the sum of fifty thousand dollars, to be reimbursed to the United States from the proceeds of the sale of their present diminished reservation, which lands shall be open to settlement after survey, excepting the sixteenth and thirty-sixth sections, which shall be reserved to the State of Kansas for school purposes, and shall be sold to actual settlers only, said settlers being heads of families or over twenty-one years of age, in quantities not exceeding one hundred and sixty acres [65 ha], in square form, to each settler, at the price of one dollar and twenty-five cents per acre; payment to be made in cash within one year from date of settlement or of the passage of this act; and the United States, in consideration of the relinquishment by said Indians of their lands in Kansas, shall pay annually interest on the amount of money received as proceeds of sale of said lands, at the rate of five per centum, to be expended by the President for the benefit of said Indians, in such manner as he may deem proper. And for this purpose an accurate account shall be kept by the Secretary of the Interior of the money received as proceeds of sale, and the aggregate amount received prior to the first day of November of each year shall be the amount upon which the payment of interest shall be based. The proceeds of sale of said land shall be carried to the credit of said Indians on the books of the treasury, and shall bear interest at the rate of five per cent. per annum: Provided, That the diminished reserve of said Indians in Kansas shall be surveyed under the direction of the Secretary of the Interior as other public lands are surveyed, as soon as the consent of said Indians is obtained as above provided, the expense of said survey to be paid from the proceeds of sale of said land.

SEC. (13.)

And be it further enacted, That there be, and is hereby, appropriated, out of any money in the Treasury not otherwise appropriated, as compensation to Osages for the stock and farming utensils which the United States agreed to furnish them by the second article of the treaty of January eleven, eighteen hundred and thirty-nine, and which were only in part furnished, twenty thousand dollars; and as compensation for the saw and grist mill(s) which the United States agreed by said treaty to maintain for them fifteen years, and which were only maintained five years, ten thousand dollars; which sums shall be expended, under the direction of the Secretary of the Interior, in the following manner: Twelve thousand dollars in erecting agency buildings, a warehouse, and blacksmith's dwellings, and a blacksmith shop, and the remaining eighteen thousand dollars in the erection of a schoolhouse and church, and a saw and grist mill at their new home in the Indian Territory.

This legislation led to the Drum Creek Treaty of 1870 which was signed on September 10, 1870. Only those two sections of the legislation were part of the treaty. Osages signing the treaty included the chiefs George Beaver, Che-she-wah-ton-kah, Black Dog II, Hard Rope, Ne-kah-wah-she-tun-kah, and his brother Joseph Pawnee-no-pashe, "Governor Joe."
