= Scottish Indian trade =

Transatlantic deerskin trade between Scots and Native Americans

The trans-Atlantic trade in deerskins was a significant commercial activity in Colonial America that was greatly influenced, and at least partially dominated, by Scottish traders and their firms. This trade, primarily in deerskins but also in beaver and other animal pelts, was carried on with Native American tribes and is usually referred to as the Indian Trade. The Indian trade was conducted largely to fill the high European and later colonial demand for deerskins and other animal pelts trapped by Indians in return for European trade goods. These pelts were shipped to Europe and used in the leather-making industry. The trade had been developing since the seventeenth century and Scottish traders played an important part in its advance.

== Before the Seven Years' War and American Revolution ==
=== Foundation of trade ===
There were several reasons why Scots were able to make inroads into the Indian trade.

==== Cultural similarities ====
One reason was due to similarities in culture and dress between the Indians and Scots. This is evidenced by the recollection, quoted by Cashin, that "the Indians were greatly attached to the Highlanders ... because of their wild manners, of their manly sports, of their eastern costume, so much resembling their own" . This together with similarly structured societies, based in both cases upon clan or tribal ties and bonds of kinship, is thought to have led to a greater trust and willingness to trade and socialise with the Scots ahead of other traders with little in common to themselves.

==== Cultural adaptation ====
The willingness of Scots traders to accept and take advantage of Indian customs was also important. They often lived in Indian villages on the frontier and took Indian wives. This is in contrast to their main competitors, French traders, who generally did not marry among the Indian tribes.. This cut the French off from one of the main advantages of Scottish traders, that of acceptance into an Indian clan. They gained a network of kin and customers within that clan and superior information from their wives as to the state of affairs, needs, and political developments of their Indian clans. The marriages ensured a connection to the kinfolk of the trader's wife in various villages, providing some protection against ill treatment and a guaranteed customer base. They generally refrained from preaching Christianity to their customers or interfering with their customs. The Spanish established missions at their trading posts and tried to convert the Indians. As Martin states, "Scottish resident traders, most of them with Native American wives and offspring, connected themselves to the existing culture instead of proscribing or attacking it". This policy worked so well that by the American Revolution, numerous Native American chiefs were of mixed Indian and Scottish descent, including Alexander McGillivray, the leader of the Creek.

==== Familial advantages ====
The Scots were partial to dealing with fellow Scots or those with a clan connection. The traders had access to kin who could carry trade goods to the Indians and, theoretically, be honest and support the trade with Indian villages. Also, once trading licences were issued, it ensured that, due to the practice of Scots selling on their licences, there was always a large Scottish presence in the Indian trade. As the first Southern Superintendent of Indian Affairs Edmond Atkin said, "Licences on the present footing may as well be given to men living in Cheapside”. Scots dealt with their own kind also was part of the tobacco trade, for many of the same reasons: the need to trust employees and business associates and a sentimental attachment to the old clan structures.

==== Manufacturing advantages ====
Since the Act of Union 1707, Scots gained access to the manufacturing and financial centres of the Kingdom of Great Britain. Scots traders made use of the London credit facilities, and the informal extended network of other Scots merchants and their financial resources. The extension of credit to those importing trade goods and to Indians purchasing goods prior to deliver of pelts, which had to be shipped across the Atlantic and sold before revenues were derived, was of paramount importance. This held true even after 1783 and United States independence. For instance, the Scots firm of Panton, Leslie and Company controlled the Florida Indian trade (which was Spanish territory following an exchange with Britain after the war) by offering credit which United States traders were unable to equal. Great Britain had a superior capacity to produce and deliver high quality goods desired by the Indians to that of the French or Spanish. At one time the commander of the French Fort Toulouse collected British trade goods as examples of what their customers wanted. The ability of Scottish traders to sustain the delivery of trade goods even in time of war also influenced their customers, as the French and Spanish had difficulty in supplying the Indians. As the French Governor of Louisiana stated, the Indians "every day tell our traders that if they were in a position to supply them with the things that they need, they would never permit the English to come upon their land". British, or Scottish, traders offered better credit terms, a reliable source of supply, and a wider variety and better quality of goods than their competitors.

==== Employment advantages ====
The British colonial authorities often relied on Scottish traders as messengers, translators, sources of information, and informal agents of the Empire. They used traders to carry presents, or bribes, to the Indians, which increased the traders' popularity. They were more popular among the Indians, especially as the French required them to journey to Fort Toulouse or other French outposts to receive presents. By being official gift givers, the traders could avoid using their own resources for presents to the Indians. This secondary occupation of the traders allowed them to function as a valuable conduit between the Indians and the heads of the colonies, this enabled them to transmit Government policy, reassurances and proposals to the Indians, thus gaining their trust and custom. One of the most well-documented traders who also functioned as an ambassador to the Indians was Lachlan McGillivray, who acted as interpreter for several Indian conferences. He was instrumental in opening the Choctaw tribe to British traders and in laying the groundwork for the Choctaw revolt against the French.

=== Trading process ===
The Scots traders development of a different way of carrying out the Indian trade was a major factor in its expansion. They formed trading companies with minor traders working on behalf of the company, instead of the practice of sole traders working on their own. As "for the more effectual carrying on the trade and supplying the Indians, we thought it proper to join in one company", this was to cut back on competition which would drive down profits, to reduce risk for each trader and also to combine the various, often complementary, skills and experience of the individual traders. It allowed them to keep several traders stationed at any one time in the Indian country to smooth out any difficulties which might emerge with the Indians. The best and most successful example of this is the company of the "Gentlemen of Augusta" or Brown, Rae and Company, which by 1755 had gained three-quarters of the Creek and Chickasaw trade. The Gentlemen of Augusta also avoided obvious and institutionalised exploitation of the Indians. This is shown by the company's establishment of set prices, the abandonment of Rum as a trading tool, the designation of certain Indian villages as exclusive bases for the trade and other beneficial practices. These practices were soon adopted by other traders and trading companies throughout the Georgia and Carolina Indian country, especially after the Yamasee War. This cut down on the worst abuses of the Indian trade and removed much friction between Indians, traders and colonial authorities, at least until the trade was reorganised in the wake of the Seven Years' War. These innovations of the largely Scottish Augusta company allowed its members, together with other Scottish traders such as Macartan and Campbell; Crooke, MacIntosh and Jackson and others, to effectively monopolise the Southern Indian trade until the 1760s .

=== Political appointments ===
Another factor in the Scottish grip on the Indian trade was the numerous appointees among Colonial administrators and Governors who were from Scotland. Examples included William Johnson (born in County Meath, in the Kingdom of Ireland) and John Stuart as Indian Superintendents, and of James Grant, George Johnstone and James Glen as Governors. The preponderance of Scots in positions of authority in the successive colonial administrations became an important resource to provide various Scots traders with connections, government contracts, a conduit to those making policy, aid in gaining trading licences and other potentially valuable assistance in their trade.

== End of "Scottish" trade, start of American and Canadian trades ==
With the Conquest of New France by the British in 1759, Scottish merchants became predominant in the city of Montreal. However, they were soon cut off from their ethnic cousins in the Thirteen Colonies by the American Revolution and War of Independence. From then on, the Montreal-based traders in the North West Company had to concentrate on British-claimed territories only, whereas Scottish-American traders in the newly independent United States became part of the mountain man tradition in the central interior of the continent. Venturing into the other's territories was considered an international provocation.

== See also ==
- North American fur trade
- Colonial history of the United States
