= White Hair =

Name of several Osage leaders

White Hair or Pawhuska (/pɒˈhʌskə/ paw-HUSK-ə; Osage: 𐓅𐓘𐓢𐓶𐓮𐓤𐓘, romanized: hpahúska) is the name of several Osage leaders in the eighteenth and nineteenth centuries. A tintype image of White Hair can be seen at the Osage Nation Museum in Pawhuska, Oklahoma.

== White Hair I ==
The first White Hair, Paw-Hiu-Skah, Pahuska, or Pawhuska, was born about 1763 and died about 1809. The town of Pawhuska, Oklahoma is named for him. He was the chief of the Thorny-Valley people, a division of the Osage people. In 1791, Pawhuska is reputed to have fought against American troops under Arthur St. Clair in Ohio. During the battle, the worst defeat ever suffered by U.S. forces against Indians, Pawhuska attempted to scalp a fallen officer but the man's powdered wig came off in Pawhuska's hand. In the ensuing confusion, the officer escaped. The chief was impressed by how the wig protected its original wearer, so he kept it for the rest of his life and became known as White Hair.

In the late eighteenth century, the Osage were a powerful tribe on the Western prairies with an empire that reached south from the Missouri River to the Red River. Pawhuska was the most prominent chief and had the closest relationships with French traders, especially the Chouteau family which operated under the rule of the Spanish government. The Osage frequently had skirmishes and battles with the Spanish and other Indian tribes. However, internal dissension weakened the Osage and they split into three main groups. In 1796, the group headed by Clermont (Claremore) and Pawhuska settled near Jean Pierre Chouteau's trading post on the Verdigris River in Indian Territory.

In 1800, the Marqués de Casa Calvo, the newly appointed governor of Louisiana, accused Osages of stealing from and murdering non-Natives and encouraged Pawhuska and his band of Osages to fight the rest of the Osages. Pawhuska refused.

One of Pawhuska's daughters married Kaw chief White Plume and thus established a lasting peace between the Osage and Kaw. White Plume's great-great-grandson was Charles Curtis, vice president of the United States, and many present-day Kaw Indians can trace their ancestry back to White Plume and Pawhuska.

== White Hair II through VI ==
The lineage of Pawhuska continued with his son, White Hair II, but he apparently was an ineffective chief, and he was soon replaced by White Hair III, who moved most of the remaining members of the Osage tribe to the Neosho River in Oklahoma in 1822. The Osage subsequently were forced by both white and Indian encroachment on their lands to move back to a small reservation in Kansas. White Hair IV (George White Hair) became chief in 1832 and served until his death in 1852, aged 48. His cousin Iron Hawk became White Hair V until his death in 1861, also 48 years old.

Little White Hair (White Hair VI) became the last hereditary Principal Chief of the Osage Nation, serving until his death on December 24, 1869. In 1865, White Hair VI was one of the signers of a treaty that ceded most Osage lands to the United States.

In 1868, the U.S. Indian Commissioner appointed the chief of the Big Hill clan, Joseph Pawnee-no-pashe, Governor of the Osage Nation because Little White Hair refused to negotiate moving the reservation. Outside of U.S. negotiations, Little White Hair maintained complete executive power until he died on December 24, 1869, leaving the position of Principal Chief vacant. In the following years, the Osage Governor (a title only ever held by Pawnee-no-pashe) was the leader. In 1870, Pawnee-no-pashe and other Osage leaders finalized the agreement to sell their Kansas lands in exchange for a reservation in the Indian Territory (now Osage County, Oklahoma).

The title of Principal Chief of the Osage Nation was revived in 1882, the position now elected instead of hereditary, and the governorship was abolished.
