= Superintendency system =

The Superintendency system was the United States Government's means of administration for relations with Native American tribes across wide swaths of the American west during part of the 19th century. It included the Northern Superintendency, Southern Superintendency, Central Superintendency, Washington Superintendency and others.

The Superintendency system established schools, oversaw the distribution of supplies, and dealt with disputes and negotiations involving tribes.

== History ==
The Superintendency system was instituted by the British Empire in the mid-1700s during its rivalry with France.

Edmond Atkin was the first Southern Superintendent of Indian Affairs.

The United States instituted its Superintendency system with the Ordinance for the Regulation of Indian Affairs passed by the Continental Congress on August 7, 1786. It created a northern and southern superintendency divided by the Ohio River. The last superintendency was abolished by 1878.
