= Arthur Bonnicastle =

Osage politician (1877–1923)

8th Principal chief of the Osage Nation
- In office 1920–1922
- Succeeded by: Ne-kah-wah-she-tun-kah

Osage Nation tribal councilor
- In office 1922–1923
- In office 1908–1910

Personal details
- Born: February 20, 1877 Osage Nation, Indian Territory
- Died: May 30, 1923 (aged 46)
- Citizenship: Osage Nation
- Education: Carlisle Indian School

Military service
- Allegiance: United States
- Branch/service: United States Army
- Years of service: 1900–1903
- Unit: 9th Cavalry Regiment
- Conflict: Boxer Rebellion; Battle of Tientsin; Battle of Yangcun

Arthur Bonnicastle (February 20, 1877 – May 30, 1923) was an Osage politician who served as the 8th elected principal chief of the Osage Nation from 1920 to 1922. Born in the Osage Nation, Indian Territory, Bonnicastle attended the Carlisle Indian School before enlisting in the United States Army in 1900. He served in the 9th Cavalry Regiment during the Boxer Rebellion and was discharged in 1903. After returning home, he entered tribal politics and served on the Osage Nation tribal council from 1908 to 1910 and 1922 until his death in 1923.

== Early life and military service ==
Arthur Bonnicastle was born on February 20, 1877, in the Osage Nation, Indian Territory, (later Oklahoma Territory from May 1890-November 1907 and then Osage County, Oklahoma after 1907) to his mother Me-Tse-He. He is named after the titular character in Josiah Gilbert Holland's 1873 novel Arthur Bonnicastle. In 1899 he attended the Carlisle Indian School before joining the United States Army the next year. He was sent to the Philippines (then a U.S. colony) and deployed to China on July 9, 1900, and took part in the Battle of Tientsin and the Battle of Yangcun during the Boxer Rebellion. In 1903 he was honorably discharged and briefly returned to school at Carlisle. He married Augelia Penn in November 1903.

== Political career and death ==
Bonnicastle served as a delegate to Washington D.C. for the Osage Nation in 1904, 1905, and 1906. In 1908, Bonnicastle ran for the Osage Nation tribal council and won the election. He lost re-election in 1910. In 1920, he was elected the 8th principal chief of the Osage Nation. In 1922, he did not seek re-election as chief and instead ran for and won a tribal council seat. The Osage Nation reports that he fell off a train and died while returning from Washington D.C. Newspapers reported that he died on Wednesday morning, May 30, 1923, in a hospital in Kansas City from an illness.

== In media ==
Bonnicastle was portrayed by Yancey Red Corn in the 2023 film Killers of the Flower Moon.
