= Fort Smith Council =

1865 meetings between the US govt and Indian tribes

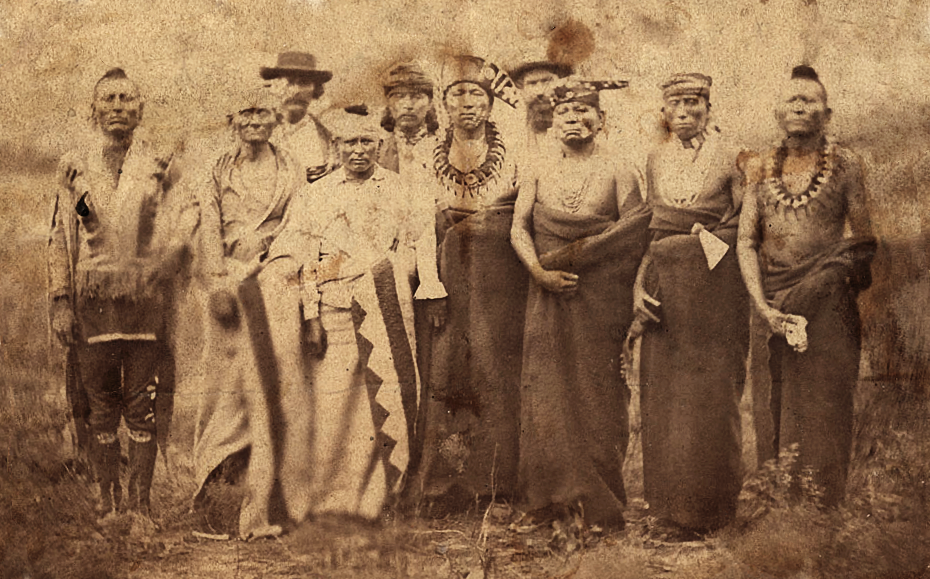
- A group of Osage chiefs at the conference
- Date: September 8–21, 1865
- Location: Fort Smith, Arkansas; 35°23′18″N 94°25′47″W
- Also known as: Indian Council

The Fort Smith Council (September 21, 1865), also known as the Indian Council, was a series of meetings held at Fort Smith, Arkansas from September 8–21, 1865. The mandatory meetings were organized by the United States Commissioner of Indian Affairs, Dennis N. Cooley, for Indian tribes east of the Rockies (and particularly those living in the unorganized Indian Territory of the Midwest). The U.S. knew about the earlier Camp Napoleon Council (at Cottonwood Grove on the Washita River, now Verden, Oklahoma) in May 1865, but Cooley regarded it as unauthorized and ineffective; in the eyes of the U.S. it was a too-little-too-late way to avoid sanctions from supporting the Confederacy.

Other members of Cooley's party representing the U. S. government were: Elijah Sells, Superintendent of Indian Affairs for the Southern Superintendency; William Harney, an Army officer who had spent most of the Civil War in Europe; Ely Parker, a Seneca chief and U. S. Army officer who had been the military secretary for General Grant; Charles Mix, secretary of the council and long-time chief clerk at the Bureau of Indian Affairs. (Note: Two members of the U. S. delegation who did not attend the Fort Smith Council meetings were:General Francis J. Herron; and a (first name or initial not given) Evans, Commissioner of Public Lands.)

Major Indian leaders at the council included John Ross, the Cherokee chief, Elias Boudinot, Dennis Bushyhead, and Peter Pitchlynn. John Ross was formally impeached on September 15 as spokesman of the Cherokee, and although loitering in Washington, D.C., for most of the war, he had sympathized with the Confederates early on.

As president of the Treaty Commission, D. N. Cooley started the second day with his opening address. First, he reminded all present of the reasons for the meeting. The purpose was to discuss the future treaties and land allocations following the close of the American Civil War. Attendance was mandatory for all the tribes that had signed treaties with the Confederate States government—Creek, Choctaw, Chickasaw, Seminole, Cherokee, Shawnee, Delaware, Wichita, Comanche, Great Osage, Seneca, and Quapaw. The purpose was to notify them that, by taking up war against the United States, they had abrogated all their previous treaties and forfeited all their lands and annuities, and to discuss terms of the new treaties. He noted that Congress had already passed a law to that effect on July 5, 1862, forming the starting point for any new treaties. It was also to notify those tribes living in Indian Territory that some of their previous lands were to be turned over to the tribes who were being relocated from their reservations in Kansas.

== Government stipulations ==
Cooley pointed out that the new treaties would be executed with individual tribes, and that each must address the following stipulations:

1. Each tribe must enter into a treaty for permanent peace and amity with themselves, each nation and tribe, and with the United States.

2. Those settled in the Indian territory must bind themselves, when called upon by the government, to aid in compelling the Indians of the plains to maintain peaceful relations with each other, with the Indians in the territory, and with the United States.

3. The institution of slavery, which has existed among several of the tribes, must be forthwith abolished, and measures taken for the unconditional emancipation of all persons held in bondage, and for their incorporation into the tribes on an equal footing with the original members, or suitably provided for.

4. A stipulation in the treaties that slavery, or involuntary servitude, shall never exist in the tribe or nation, except in punishment of crime.

5. A portion of the lands hitherto owned and occupied by you must be set apart for the friendly tribes in Kansas and elsewhere, on such terms as may be agreed upon by the parties and approved by government, or such as may be fixed by the government.

6. It is the policy of the government, unless other arrangement be made, that all the nations and tribes in the Indian territory be formed into one consolidated government after the plan proposed by the Senate of the United States, in a bill for organizing the Indian territory.

7. No white person, except officers, agents, and employees of the government, or of any internal improvement authorized by the government, will be permitted to reside in the territory, unless formally incorporated with some tribes, according to the usages of the band.

Several of these stipulations were new to the tribes, and caused much consternation and argument. They were already aware that the government planned to take part of their lands in the territory, and realized that they had no bargaining power on that point. (Note: The commissioners accepted the fact that deciding how much of each tribe's land would be forfeited for siding with the Confederacy could not be settled in this conference - another would be required to do that.) They were prepared to make peace with each other (they had agreed to that in principle at the Camp Napoleon Council, which the government refused to recognize), and they knew, of course, about the outlawing of slavery. They were unprepared for the demand that the freed slaves (freedmen) be made full members of the tribe who had formerly owned them. And they were equally opposed to forming one consolidated government, which they recognized as dissolving tribal government outright, effectively extinguishing their identities. Choctaw Chief Allen Wright suggested the term Oklahoma as the name for the Indian Territory under an intertribal council.

The last stipulation was never enforced well. It was one of many, but probably the most serious of the issues the Osages had on their reservation land. Whites ignoring reservation boundaries and squatting made for increasing pressure and conflict between the whites and Indian tribes.

== Canville Treaty with the Osage in 1865 ==
The Osage reservation up until 1865 had been a fifty-mile strip north-to-south (of indeterminate expanse east-west, approximately 270 miles) in what is now southern Kansas. They had experienced an increase of squatters on their lands, and the U.S. Government had a solution: sell most of it at $1.25 per acre and hopefully the settlers will stay off your land. The 1865 treaty would have some similarities to an 1863 treaty that had not been ratified.

The commissioner mentioned an Osage treaty by the Great Osages with the Confederacy on October 21, 1861, but the Osages would not be punished for this. The Osages had also worked for Union causes during the war, as well. Regardless, after the Fort Smith Council, the Osage quickly made a treaty. In two separate signings, they agreed to a major reduction in their land holdings. The treaty was signed September 29, 1865 at the Canville Trading Post, which was part of the Osage Reservation in Kansas at the time. The Black Dog and Clermont (or Claremore) bands signed separately at Fort Smith. Sometimes referred to as the Canville Treaty, it was ratified by the U.S. on June 26, 1866, and published on January 21, 1867. Signatories included Principal Chief of the Osage Nation, White Hair VI and chiefs of the major bands: Ta-wah-she-he, Clermont, Black Dog, Little Bear, plus the soon-to-be appointed governor of the Osage and fluent English-speaker, Chief Joseph Paw-ne-no-pashe.

Article I ceded a 30-by-50-mile (48 by 80 km) parcel comprising 843,927 acres (341,525 ha) or 871,791.11 acres (352,801.35 ha), with the widest portion being north-south, known as the "Osage Ceded Lands." This treaty ceded the Osage's favorite lodging sites on the Neosho River in southeast Kansas, including the cabins and cultivated lands of the half-breeds.

Article I of the Canville Treaty set aside $300,000 to the Osage from the sale of the Ceded Lands; the remainder was to establish an education fund because the Osages wished to continue their training in Western culture, agriculture, and language. However, the language of Article I that created the Civilization Fund was incorrect. The fund had been intended to disenfranchise only those Osages who had left the tribe for Canada and Mexico during the War of 1812 and the Civil War. This was not the case. Article I as written instead ended up funding programs (at the discretion of the Department of the Interior) throughout the U.S. that benefited over 100 different Indian tribes. Its wording had specified "Indian tribes" instead of the intended "Osage Indians." It was said to be the only treaty in history that land had been acquired from one tribe and its proceeds went to others. This meant that as Osage Ceded Lands were being sold by the Department of the Interior, little of that went to the Osages, instead being placed into a "slush fund" to support even their enemies.

Article II ceded a strip of land 20 miles north-to-south and extending approximately 242 miles east-west, about 3,100,000 acres (1,300,000 ha). The ceded lands of Article II, known as the "Osage Trust Lands," were to be sold by the U.S. Land Office at $1.25 per acre. This left another strip of land from earlier treaties of 30-mile (48 km) wide north-to-south in southern Kansas, with the south bordering the "Cherokee Outlet" in Indian Territory, i.e. modern Oklahoma and the western extent around the 100th meridian west. This became the Osage Diminished Reserve. The Ingalls family, made famous in books by Laura Ingalls Wilder, were squatters on Osage Diminished Reserve land starting in 1869, and they were not particularly close to any border. The Osage Diminished Reserve was about 4,600,000 acres (1,900,000 ha).

When the Cherokees saw the Osage treaty, they protested its borders, because it meant that they lost several hundred thousand acres of land. The Cherokee Treaty of July 19, 1866 compensated the Cherokee $1.25 an acre for it.

The Canville Treaty would be quickly followed by negotiations for a way to get the Osage out of Kansas and a railroad through their former land (the hotly contested Sturges Osage Treaty), culminating in the Drum Creek Treaty of 1870.

== Treaties of 1866 ==
Before the Fort Smith council adjourned, it was agreed that the delegations would reconvene in Washington D. C. in early 1866 to complete their individual treaties with the government.

- The Seminoles, whose obligations were straightforward, completed their work first, on March 21, 1866.
- The Choctaws and Chickasaws confederated for the purposes of their treaty. They completed it on April 28, 1866. It was ratified with one amendment on June 28. The amendment was accepted by the government on July 2, and became effective July 10.
- The Creeks completed their treaty on June 14.
- The Cherokees came to terms on July 19, but the treaty was not proclaimed (put into effect) until August 14, 1866.

== See also ==
- Camp Napoleon Council
- Indian Territory in the American Civil War
- Reconstruction Treaties
