= Chetopa–St. Paul USD 505 =

Public school district in Chetopa, Kansas

Address
- 430 Elm St. Chetopa, Kansas, 67336; United States
- Coordinates: 37°2′19″N 95°5′22″W

District information
- Type: Public
- Grades: K to 12
- Schools: 6

Other information
- Website: usd505.org

Chetopa–St. Paul USD 505 is a public unified school district headquartered in Chetopa, Kansas, United States. The district includes the communities of Chetopa, St. Paul, and nearby rural areas.

The school district is non-contiguous as the St. Paul portion of the district was once a part of Erie USD 101. The Parsons and Oswego districts split the two parts. St. Paul's portion is north of Parsons while Chetopa's is south of Oswego.

== Schools ==
The school district operates the following schools:

Schools in Chetopa

- Chetopa High School
- Chetopa Junior High School
- Chetopa Elementary School

Schools in St. Paul

- St. Paul High School
- St. Paul Junior High School
- St. Paul Elementary School

== See also ==
- Kansas State Department of Education
- Kansas State High School Activities Association
- List of high schools in Kansas
- List of unified school districts in Kansas
