= John V. Farwell Jr. =

John Villers Farwell Jr. (October 16, 1858 – June 17, 1944) was an American merchant. He was the son of John V. Farwell, the namesake of the John V. Farwell & Co. wholesale dry goods of Chicago. John Junior became president of the company after his father passed in 1908.

== Biography ==
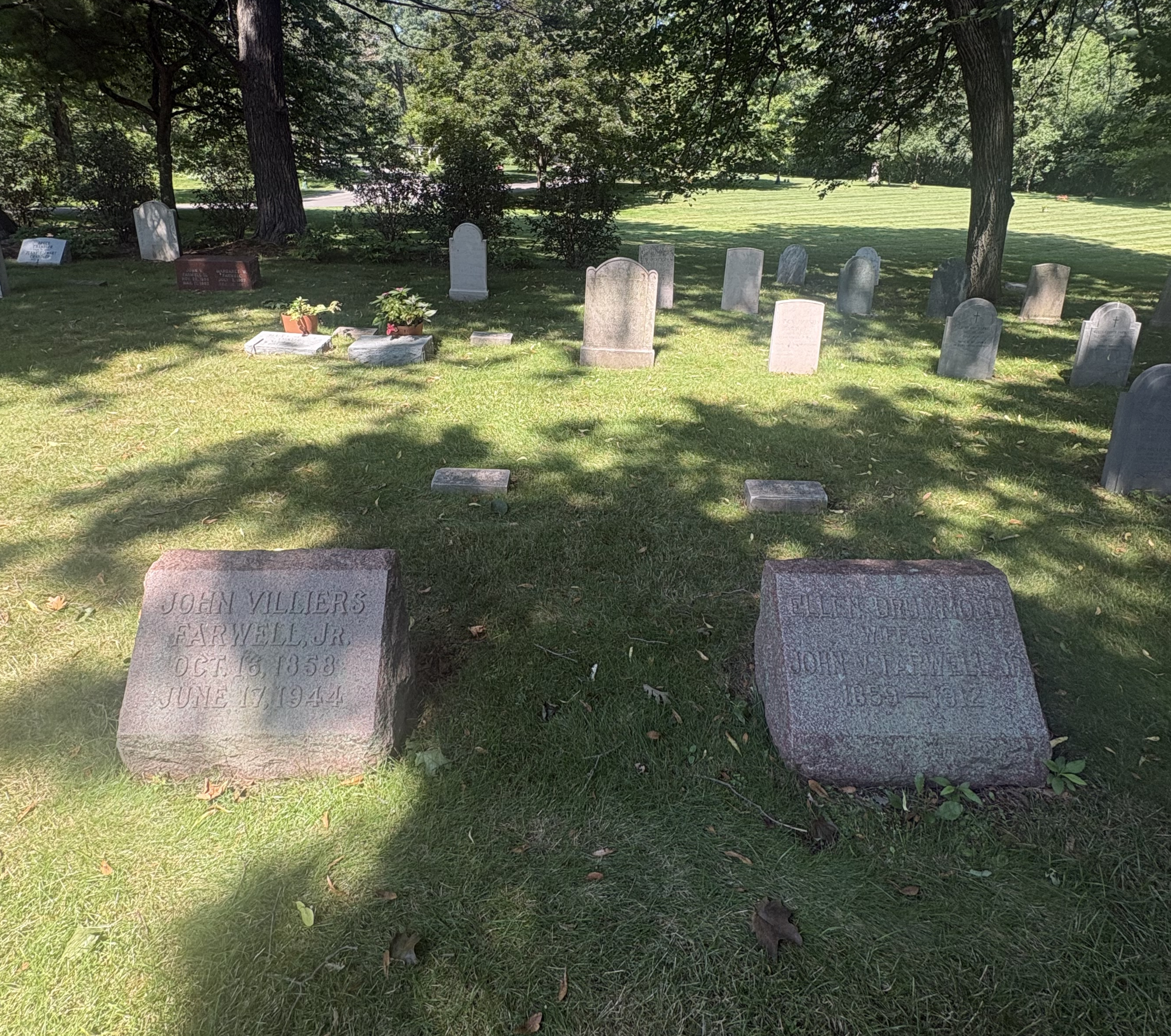
Farwell's grave at Lake Forest Cemetery

John was born on October 16, 1858 in Chicago, Illinois, growing up with his parents in Chicago. In 1870, his father was tasked with being a commissioner to the Osage Indians. John, eleven, was invited to go along.

In 1936, John wrote of his trip to Kansas to see the Osage. He was invited to a footrace with an Indian boy a few years older than he:

I had always been a good runner, especially for short distances, so that when they gave the signal to start, I, being a little quicker than the Indian, got off first, and ran just as hard as I could, knowing I could keep it up for a hundred yards. [...] I kept ahead of him, but I heard him getting closer and closer, as we came near the finish. I felt sure if we had run twenty yards more he could have beaten me, but I got to the finish about five or six yards ahead of him, and there was great excitement among the Indians to think a white boy had beaten this Indian boy.

John attended Yale College at the same time as future president, William Howard Taft. This connection would come in handy later, during his time at XIT Ranch, which was owned by investors, including the Farwells.

John was also instrumental in another frontier dispute. When New Mexico Territory wrote its Constitution, it merely listed the description of the intended border, not the true one, with Texas. John contacted his old friend Taft and asked him to intervene. The XIT Ranch owned several thousand acres on the New Mexico-Texas border. Any shift would immediately result in a dispute over residency, taxes, and land ownership. The intervention worked, and a joint resolution of Congress passed on February 24, 1911.

Farwell died from a heart attack at his home in Lake Forest, Illinois on June 17, 1944, and was buried at Lake Forest Cemetery.
