= Camp Napoleon Council =

1865 meeting of Native American tribes

The Camp Napoleon Council was a meeting of Native American tribes in today's Oklahoma that resulted in an intertribal compact. The council took place at Cottonwood Camp on May 24, 1865, near present-day Verden in Grady County. "The Mottos or great principle of Confederate Indian tribes shall be "An Indian shall not spill an Indian's blood."

== Background ==
By early 1865, the Civil War had turned decisively against the Confederate States of America. Until then the Confederate military had provided support to maintain the Indian Territory as a buffer between Texas and the United States. However, after 1864, the South had been forced to withdraw its military forces and supplies to defend its states west of the Mississippi River. Except for the Native American troops serving the Confederate Army under General Stand Watie, the shooting war was virtually over in the Indian Territory. Pro-Confederate Indians agreed that a council of the Five Civilized Tribes, the Prairie Indians, and the Plains Indians should be held to end intertribal hostilities (Note: One of the most vicious examples of inter-tribal warfare in the Indian Territory during the Civil War was the Tonkawa Massacre of 1862.) and to negotiate terms for their return to the United States. The government of Texas was concerned about the security of its northern border, and wanted the tribes in the Indian Territory to continue to protect against Union incursions. They would send their own representatives (either Albert Pike or Douglas H. Cooper) to attend the council. (Note: Lewis reported that Texas representatives did attend the meeting, but took no active role.)

The council was scheduled to meet on May 14, 1865, at Council Grove (near present-day Oklahoma City). However, it was learned that Union troops planned to disrupt the meeting. The council was accordingly rescheduled to May 26, 1865, and relocated to Camp Napoleon. The Encyclopedia of Oklahoma History and Culture says the site of Camp Napoleon was on the Washita River, and covered the whole area of the present day city of Verden, (Note: Lewis wrote that the reason Camp Napoleon had that name was unknown.) after rumors of an impending Union attack on the original meeting.

== Purpose of the council ==
The Native American tribes of the Indian Territory realized that the Confederacy could no longer fulfill its commitments to them. Therefore, the Camp Napoleon Council was called to draft an agreement to present a united front as they negotiated a return of their loyalty to the United States. Native American tribes further west, many of them also at war with the United States troops, were also invited to take part, and several of them did.

== Camp Napoleon Compact ==
The tribes of the Indian Territory agreed to cease fighting with one another and work together to form a confederation to maintain the political integrity of the Indian Territory. They also elected delegates to travel to Washington and negotiate with the federal government. They agreed upon a compact that described the basic principles they wanted to be incorporated into any post-war treaties with the United States government. Signing the Compact were representatives of the following Indian nations: the Cherokee Nation, Creek, Choctaw, Chickashaw, Seminole, Reserve Caddo Nation, Osage Nation, Reserve Comanche Band, Kiowa Nation, Arapahoe Nation, Cheyenne Nation, Lapan Band of Opaches, Noconee Band of Comanche Nation, Cochahkah Band Comanches, Tinnawith Band Comanches, Yampucka Band of Comanches, Nooches Band of Commanches, Nooches Band of Commanches.

== Aftermath ==
At the end of the meeting, the council appointed commissioners (no more than five for each tribe) to attend a conference with the U.S. government in Washington, D.C., at which the results of the Camp Napoleon Council would be presented and discussed. However, the U.S. government refused to treat such a large group representing so many tribes. Furthermore, the government regarded the Camp Napoleon meeting as unofficial and unauthorized. The President later called for a meeting at Fort Smith (called the Fort Smith Council), which was held in September 1865.

From the standpoint of the Indians, the Camp Napoleon Council and its compact was a significant step, because this action mitigated intertribal warfare after the Civil War. However, it had no effect on ameliorating the U.S. government policy to punish all those tribes who were considered hostile for having supported the cause of the Confederacy.

In 1931, the Oklahoma College for Women erected a commemorative marker at the Camp Napoleon site, on the school ground at State Highway 62. The inscription reads:

CAMP NAPOLEON COUNCIL

"Here on May 26, 1865 a compact was entered into between the Confederate Indian Tribes and the Prairie Indian Tribes
That the ancient council fires shall be kept kindled and blazing."
