= Enoch Hoag =

American Indian agent

Superintendent of the Central Superintendency
- In office 1869–c. 1877

Personal details
- Born: 1812
- Died: 1884 (aged 71–72)

Enoch Hoag (1812–1884) was an Indian Agent who was appointed Superintendent of the Central Superintendency in 1869 by President Ulysses S. Grant during his "Peace Policy". His tenure ended after the election of Rutherford B. Hayes. The University of Oklahoma has a collection of his papers. Haverford College also has a collections of his papers.

He was a Quaker, specifically a member of the Iowa Yearly Meeting.

The Central Superintendency had responsibility for Indian affairs with various tribes in the areas including parts of what are now Kansas and Nebraska.

Hoag helped communicate U.S. government interests in Kaw land.
