= Chetopa, Kansas =

City in Labette County, Kansas

- City
- Location within Labette County and Kansas

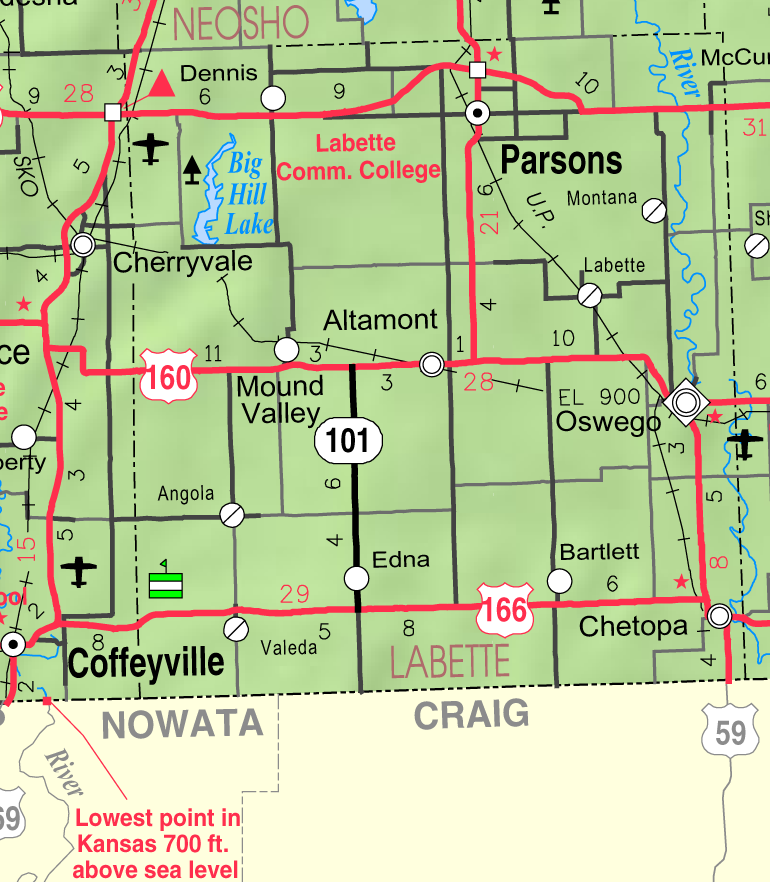
- KDOT map of Labette County (legend)
- Coordinates: 37°2′15″N 95°5′31″W
- Country: United States
- State: Kansas
- County: Labette
- Incorporated: 1857
- Named for: Chief Chetopah

Area
  - Total: 1.44 sq mi (3.74 km^{2})
  - Land: 1.36 sq mi (3.53 km^{2})
  - Water: 0.077 sq mi (0.20 km^{2})
- Elevation: 824 ft (251 m)

Population (2020)
  - Total: 929
  - Density: 682/sq mi (263/km^{2})
- Time zone: UTC-6 (CST)
  - Summer (DST): UTC-5 (CDT)
- ZIP Code: 67336
- Area code: 620
- FIPS code: 20-12950
- GNIS ID: 469285
- Website: chetopa.org

Chetopa is a city in Labette County, Kansas, United States. As of the 2020 census, the population of the city was 929. Chetopa was named for Chief Chetopah, an Osage Indian chief who lived in the area and sold land for the city of Winfield, Kansas. Later, the community name was shortened.

== History ==
The community began as an Osage village, named after its Chief Chetopah, whose name in the Osage language signifies "four lodges." He was an advocate of peace, the leading chief of the Little Osage band, and one of the chief counselors of the Osage Nation.

The Osage had a large reservation in southern Kansas since the Osage Treaty of 1825. White settlers were not supposed to be in the area, but in 1847, a trading post to exchange goods with the Osage Nation was established by Larkin McGhee. By the time of McGhee's arrival, there were three other white families squatting there, plus two families with a white husband and a Cherokee wife at Chetopah. There were also many Osage on their reservation there.

Chetopah was the site of an early Civil War battle on September 18, 1861, between the 6th Kansas Cavalry under the direction of James G. Blunt and pro-slavery raiders led by John Allen Mathews, whose wife was an Osage and was culturally identified with the Osages.

The first post office in Chetopah was established in April 1867. In 1880, Postmaster J.M. Cavaness petitioned the removal of the ending "h" in the original spelling to become Chetopa.

Chetopa was the destination of the Nevada and Minden Railway, completed in 1886. The town attracted that line, which ran southwest from Nevada, Missouri through Pittsburg, Kansas, when it donated land for right-of-way and year/depot purposes. Much of the trackage has since been abandoned.

== Geography ==
Chetopa is located at 37°2′15″N 95°5′31″W (37.037452, -95.091892). According to the United States Census Bureau, the city has a total area of 1.42 square miles (3.68 km^{2}), of which 1.34 square miles (3.47 km^{2}) is land and 0.08 square miles (0.21 km^{2}) is water.

=== Climate ===
The climate in this area is characterized by hot, humid summers and generally mild to cool winters. According to the Köppen Climate Classification system, Chetopa has a humid subtropical climate, abbreviated "Cfa" on climate maps.

== Demographics ==
Historical population
Census	Pop.	Note	%±
1870	960		—
1880	1,305		35.9%
1890	2,265		73.6%
1900	2,019		−10.9%
1910	1,548		−23.3%
1920	1,519		−1.9%
1930	1,344		−11.5%
1940	1,606		19.5%
1950	1,671		4.0%
1960	1,538		−8.0%
1970	1,596		3.8%
1980	1,751		9.7%
1990	1,357		−22.5%
2000	1,281		−5.6%
2010	1,125		−12.2%
2020	929		−17.4%
U.S. Decennial Census

=== 2020 census ===
The 2020 United States census counted 929 people, 430 households, and 233 families in Chetopa. The population density was 681.1 per square mile (263.0/km^{2}). There were 530 housing units at an average density of 388.6 per square mile (150.0/km^{2}). The racial makeup was 86.87% (807) white or European American (86.22% non-Hispanic white), 1.4% (13) black or African-American, 4.2% (39) Native American or Alaska Native, 1.08% (10) Asian, 0.11% (1) Pacific Islander or Native Hawaiian, 0.11% (1) from other races, and 6.24% (58) from two or more races. Hispanic or Latino of any race was 0.75% (7) of the population.

Of the 430 households, 24.4% had children under the age of 18; 38.1% were married couples living together; 30.7% had a female householder with no spouse or partner present. 41.2% of households consisted of individuals and 24.0% had someone living alone who was 65 years of age or older. The average household size was 2.1 and the average family size was 2.8. The percent of those with a bachelor's degree or higher was estimated to be 11.5% of the population.

19.9% of the population was under the age of 18, 6.2% from 18 to 24, 17.0% from 25 to 44, 31.5% from 45 to 64, and 25.3% who were 65 years of age or older. The median age was 49.9 years. For every 100 females, there were 101.5 males. For every 100 females ages 18 and older, there were 106.1 males.

The 2016–2020 5-year American Community Survey estimates show that the median household income was $21,953 (with a margin of error of +/- $13,624) and the median family income was $42,188 (+/- $10,817). The median income for those above 16 years old was $20,375 (+/- $8,945). Approximately, 29.2% of families and 34.0% of the population were below the poverty line, including 61.6% of those under the age of 18 and 17.4% of those ages 65 or over.

=== 2010 census ===
As of the census of 2010, there were 1,125 people, 493 households, and 292 families residing in the city. The population density was 839.6 inhabitants per square mile (324.2/km^{2}). There were 647 housing units at an average density of 482.8 per square mile (186.4/km^{2}). The racial makeup of the city was 85.4% White, 2.1% African American, 6.0% Native American, 0.3% Asian, 1.0% from other races, and 5.2% from two or more races. Hispanic or Latino of any race were 3.2% of the population.

There were 493 households, of which 25.2% had children under the age of 18 living with them, 42.8% were married couples living together, 11.2% had a female householder with no husband present, 5.3% had a male householder with no wife present, and 40.8% were non-families. 36.3% of all households were made up of individuals, and 18.5% had someone living alone who was 65 years of age or older. The average household size was 2.22 and the average family size was 2.87.

The median age in the city was 46.9 years. 20.3% of residents were under the age of 18; 8.4% were between the ages of 18 and 24; 19.1% were from 25 to 44; 29.3% were from 45 to 64; and 22.9% were 65 years of age or older. The gender makeup of the city was 49.3% male and 50.7% female.

=== 2000 census ===
As of the census of 2000, there were 1,281 people, 560 households, and 341 families residing in the city. The population density was 1,004.9 inhabitants per square mile (388.0/km^{2}). There were 651 housing units at an average density of 510.7 per square mile (197.2/km^{2}). The racial makeup of the city was 89.15% White, 2.26% African American, 6.32% Native American, 0.08% from other races, and 2.19% from two or more races. Hispanic or Latino of any race were 1.01% of the population.

There were 560 households, out of which 24.8% had children under the age of 18 living with them, 46.1% were married couples living together, 9.6% had a female householder with no husband present, and 39.1% were non-families. 35.7% of all households were made up of individuals, and 19.6% had someone living alone who was 65 years of age or older. The average household size was 2.22 and the average family size was 2.85.

In the city, the population was spread out, with 22.3% under the age of 18, 7.2% from 18 to 24, 22.6% from 25 to 44, 24.2% from 45 to 64, and 23.7% who were 65 years of age or older. The median age was 44 years. For every 100 females, there were 90.6 males. For every 100 females age 18 and over, there were 86.3 males.

As of 2000 the median income for a household in the city was $23,250, and the median income for a family was $29,338. Males had a median income of $24,479 versus $19,231 for females. The per capita income for the city was $11,705. About 13.1% of families and 18.8% of the population were below the poverty line, including 29.3% of those under age 18 and 15.7% of those age 65 or over.

== Education ==
Chetopa is served by three Chetopa–St. Paul USD 505 public schools:

- Chetopa Elementary School
- Chetopa Junior High School
- Chetopa High School

Chetopa is also served by a public library and a historic preservation society. The Chetopa Public Library is located at 312 Maple Street. The Historical Preservation Society of Labette County has a mission to preserve historical locales in Labette County for posterity.

== See also ==
- Great Flood of 1951
