= Ne-kah-wah-she-tun-kah =

Principal Chief of the Osage Nation

- (Ne-ka-wah-shin too-kah)
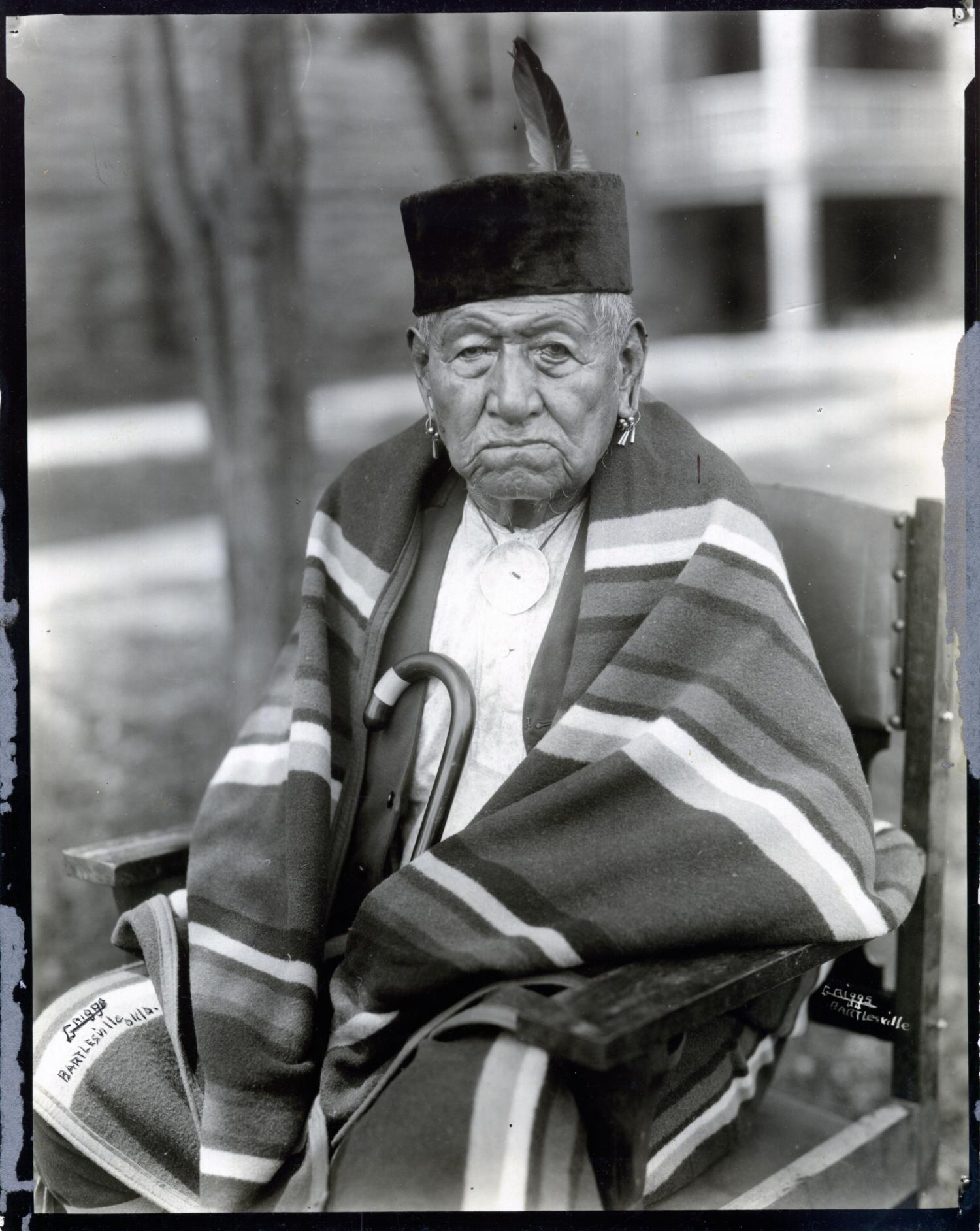
- Principal Chief Ne-kah-wah-she-tun-kah of the Osage

Principal Chief of the Osage Nation
- In office 1922 – August 3, 1923
- Preceded by: Arthur Bonnicastle
- Succeeded by: Paul Red Eagle

Principal Chief of the Osage Nation
- In office 1900–1902
- Preceded by: Black Dog II
- Succeeded by: James Bigheart

Personal details
- Born: 1839 Osage County, Oklahoma on a bend of the Arkansas River near Ponca City
- Died: August 3, 1923 (age 83–84) Osage County, Oklahoma, US
- Party: Full Bloods
- Spouse(s): Wah-ghre-lum-pah and her older sister
- Relations: Brother, Joseph Pawnee-no-pashe, a.k.a. Governor Joe
- Children: Nicholas Webster, Oliver Morton, Mrs. Little Star
- Parent(s): Father, Chief Pawnee-no-pashe
- Known for: Last hereditary chief of the Osage. Responsible for the Osage keeping mineral rights. Controversy over his burial ceremony that included a scalp of a rival chief.
- Nickname: Chief Nick

Ne-kah-wah-she-tun-kah was an Osage chief who served as the Principal Chief of the Osage Nation from 1922 until his death on August 3, 1923. "Chief Nick" also served as principal chief for an earlier term and seven terms on the tribal council. He never learned English, but was one of the most respected chiefs of the Osage. He was given Allotment 182 in the Osage Nation's list of members in 1906.

== Biography ==
He was born either in present-day Osage County, Oklahoma on a bend of the Arkansas River near Ponca City, or Big Hill Creek east of Independence, Kansas. He became chief of the Big Hill clan around 1868.

Wah-ghre-lum-pah (c. 1849–July 24, 1924) was Chief Nick's younger wife. Wah-ghre-lum-pah, a child when she married the chief, had lived in the chief's home until of age. He had also married her older sister, as well. Ne-kah-wah-she-tun-kah had children by both wives.

He was a signatory to the 1868 and then the revised 1870 Drum Creek Treaty, along with his brother Joseph Pawnee-no-pashe, who was the Governor of the Great and Little Osage Nation of Indians at the time. The brothers both traveled to Washington, D.C., representing the Osage people, at different times— Ne-kah-wah-she-tun-kah did so in 1888 and 1901, while "Governor Joe" had done so in 1874.

Ne-kah-wah-she-tun-kah became the hereditary chief of the Big Hill band after obtaining scalps as proof of his ability to lead. Other stories of scalping enemy tribes surfaced after his death, including one about Cherokee horse thieves near Claremore, Oklahoma.

When elected to his final term of principal chief in 1922, the newspaper noted the fact that he was the last hereditary tribal chief of the Osage Nation. His longtime interpreter, Charles Evanhoe, told the newspaper after his death that Ne-kah-wah-she-tun-kah would not take bribes, but rather supported his people's right to prosper individually and severally. He was also well-known for his staunch complaint against the U.S. Government's meddling in their financial affairs: they treated the Osage Indians like children by withholding their money and managing it. As for his warring nature, it was subdued from early on as he negotiated with the U.S. government on numerous occasions and wrote laws for the new nation. He was, however, implicated in a retributional raid on Cheyenne Indians, potentially killing them and taking scalps to avenge women of the Hard Rope clan.

== Death, ceremony, burial, and monument ==
When Ne-kah-wah-she-tun-kah died, he was given a full Osage traditional burial, causing a considerable controversy. His favorite horse was slaughtered, and the scalp of a former chief of the Wichita, Esadowa, was included in his tomb. The controversy over the scalp, already 50 years old, had led to the banning of scalp hunting and reparations paid to the Wichita. (See the legend of the Wichita chief scalp, below.) The procession of Chief Nick was reportedly very strict on details, including the placement of the opening of the coffin to ensure it faced East, with many news reports describing an incident where the coffin had to be removed, rotated, and replaced in the tomb.

The granite tomb and statue of his likeness is on the National Register of Historic Places for Osage County, Oklahoma. The burial would be the last traditional Osage burial.

The Smithsonian describes the statue:

Full-length figure of Chief Ne-Kah-Wah-She-Tun-Kah (also known as Chief Nick) stands on a plain square pedestal on a two-tiered base. He wears a robe with a traditional Osage ribbon border around his lower torso, and a peace medal around his neck. He also wears leggings and skin boots. His head is shaven except for a strip in the center. He holds a metal-headed tomahawk in his proper left hand close to his chest.

After his death he was succeeded by Paul Red Eagle.

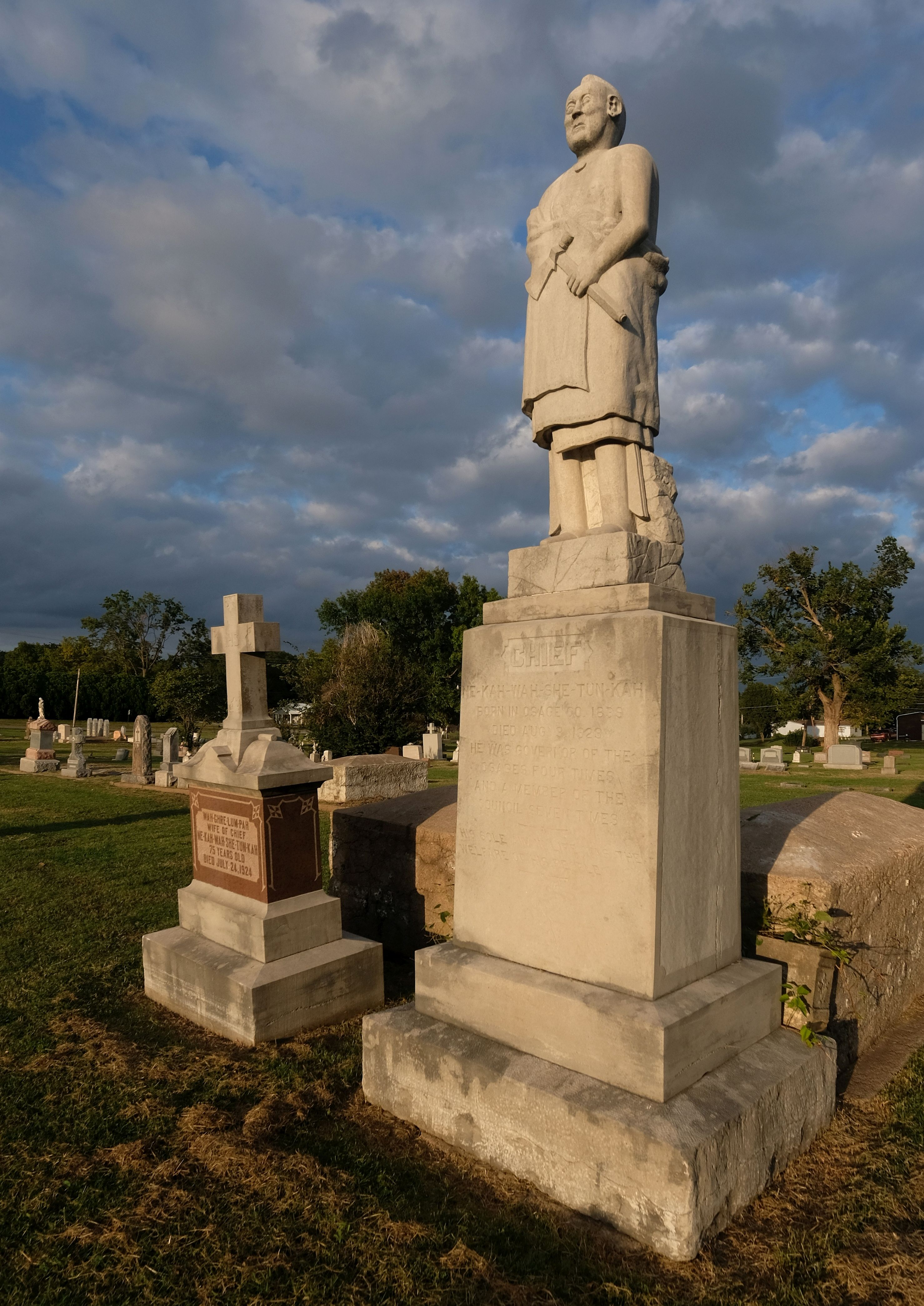
Chief Ne-Kah-Wah-She-Tun-Kah Grave and Statue in the cemetery in Fairfax, Oklahoma is on the National Register of Historic Places listings in Osage County, Oklahoma

== The legend of the Wichita chief scalp ==
Prior to Western assimilation, Osage mourning rituals could last upwards of a year after a relative's death. However, the time required could be shortened if a mourner's relative ran a quest to obtain a scalp from an enemy tribe. A warrior fulfilling the scalp bounty would strip naked and paint himself black, fearlessly attacking an innocent enemy.

By the late 19th century, this custom had long since become rare and of little importance to the Osage. Because the custom had nearly ended, the story of the last scalp bounty became a touchstone of forgotten Osage beliefs.

On May 13, 1873, the principal chief of the Wichita Indians, Esadowa, (Note: Esadowa is also written as A-sa-wah, A-sad-a-wah, Ah-sa-wah, I-sad-o-wa, I-sad-a-wa, Isadowa, Isaddawa, Isadawa, Isadawah, I-Sad-a-Wah, Sadawah, Sha-da-ah, E-sad-do-wa, Esaddowa, Esadewar, Essadua in various sources. There may be a difference in pronunciation between Osage and Wichita languages. Chief Ches-tedi-lessah succeeded Isadowa, and Tawakoni Jim followed as the next chief. An 1877 report said that there were 200 Wichitas and Is-o-da-co was now their chief. Wichita Indians - plus note that he represented Indians in 1859 before their move out of Texas to OK. Found that in a Wichita Falls, Texas paper. Another rare mention of him still alive is in 1872, where he is Sa-da-wah, chief of the Wichitas. He got a sentence. The event: a meeting of the Indians reported on Sept 10, 1872, from the Wichita Agency. Other reports from their trip East in September 1872 called him Essadua. The photo of him at NARA, called the improbable name Esadewar, is probably from this trip.) was slain by a marauding Osage scalp-hunting band near the Red Fork of the Arkansas River. His body was found decapitated, and the head was found about 100 yards (91 m) away with the scalp removed. The Osage informed Indian agents that the group responsible is called a "mourning party," and "they must have a certain number of scalps before they can stop marauding."

A June 1873 newspaper had this explanation of the ritual:

A curious custom among the Osages is said to have been cause of the recent murder, by members of that tribe, of the Wichita chief and the party of stock drovers. It is said that these persons were killed by what is called a mourning party, who were grieving for relatives who had died by violence. The superstitions of the surviving relatives taught them that a certain number of scalps must be taken before the spirit of their departed friend could rest in peace in the happy hunting grounds. The U.S. authorities are on the track of this "mourning party," and it is quite likely that they will be sent to keep their departed friend company instead of killing white men for his benefit.

=== The trial narrative ===
The following is a synopsis of an article published in 1875 about the Osage-Wichita feud over the death of Chief Esadowa, "An Osage Murder Trial," from Aboriginal Fragments, W.W. Reach. Published in the Bucks County Gazette on September 9, 1875. The events happened in the summer of 1873.

Indian agent Richards for the Wichitas began a communication with Superintendent Hoag about the arrest and punishment of the mob that killed their chief. Around this time, a payment was due the Osage as part of the 1870 treaty. The annuities would be paid to individual tribesmen. It was during this meeting that the Osage agent and then Assistant Superintendent Beede discussed the offense with Governor Joe, Joseph Pawnee-no-pashe.

Joseph was willing to have the men tried, but in an Indian court under their own rules, not a court of the U.S. government, and he had already secured the familiar Cherokee legal team of Colonels Adair and Vann. Joseph defended the men involved in the incident by explaining that their motives were completely honorable, having performed the act out of a behest of the Great Spirit, who was in control of the destinies of both the slayer and the slain. The one who had done the killing had been prompted in a dream from the Great Spirit to kill the next person he saw.

In Governor Joe's explanation to the white men, Chief Esadowa had been less victim than part of the plan of God, to which both should be obedient. While making this matter-of-fact and cordial explanation to the assembled Osage and members of the Indian commission, a delegation of fifty warriors of the Wichita Agency arrived unexpectedly, being led by Chief Esadowa's brother.

Esadowa's brother demanded satisfaction from the Osage for the crime, and if his demands were not met, he would formally declare war. In the interim between the murder and the confrontation, the Wichita, outnumbered 10 to 1 by the Osage, had made several alliances with tribes, all of whom were willing to "dig up the hatchet" and engage once again in the warfare that they had all set aside. They would also denounce the Osage as traitors and assassins. Esadowa's brother showed the alliance paperwork to those present.

The trial occurred the next day against the Osage Nation. The killer and parties responsible for the killing were not on trial and not named at this time. 1,000 Osages were present. Governor Joe, Chief Hard Rope, Chief Che-to-pah, and the two Cherokee lawyers defended the Osage. Esadowa's brother was joined by two or three other chiefs for the Wichitas. Beede represented the government.

Esadowa's brother opined that he was not there to provide proof, as the facts were well-known and not in dispute. He demanded punishment of the criminals and indemnity for the slain Chief's family.

Che-to-pah responded with the defense of an act of God - the perpetrators did not perform a criminal act, as they had acted on the command of the Great Spirit. They could therefore not receive any punishment. He protested the uninvited invasion of the Osage camp, the haughty message, and the Osage were not afraid of big words. He demanded that the Wichita be forced to provide proof of an offense, and then they could discuss indemnity for the widow.

Esadowa's brother accused the Osage Governor of trying to deny the murder when it was certain that the act had been performed by a small band of Osage men. If he denied it with a forked tongue, the Wichita would leave and defend their honor in a war of revenge.

This prompted a lengthy conference amongst the Osage leaders and the two Cherokee counsel. Col. Adair replied in much the same manner, telling those assembled that the Osage would not be bullied by words or the show of strength, but rather were interested in justice. They admit that the chief's brother was due something, but on the matter of the offense, there was no proof of Osage wrongdoing, and without that established as fact, there can be no reparations.

With the Wichita on the brink of refusing to debate, Governor Joseph Pawnee-no-pashe sued for peace:

The Wichitas are but few but they are firmly treading the road of our white brothers. They are good friends to Osages. The fallen chief has many times eaten bread with me; and we have sent up the incense of smoke to the Great Spirit together. The Osages would not be guilty of denying justice to the shade of the fallen chief.

His widow and orphans appeal to us for support, let it not be said that they have appealed in vain.

This speech made both sides happy. Col. Adair followed this up by saying that the Osages as a tribe were willing to admit having caused the death of Chief Esadowa. But the warrior's actions would not to be punished, as he had no criminal motive. If the unnamed tribesman, in a religious fervor, had mistaken a divine command, then the events were unfortunate, not criminal. The Osages would make reparation in money and horses.

This prompted a lengthy debate of the Wichitas to determine if they accepted this nuance, and if so to carefully make their demands reasonable and acceptable to their own honor. Such a deal was effectively a money for blood agreement, and it was not an easy decision. Esadowa's brother decided to take the offer, as "The Wichitas are treading the white man's road, and have buried the hatchet so many grasses ago that it has now grown rusty."

He asked for $1000 in money, 20 horses, and $500 in "annuity goods," i.e. the kinds provided by the U.S. government on a yearly basis. He also had to deal with the matter of mourning his brother, whose bloodshed he believed required the death of his murderer. "The shade of the fallen chief will mourn that it is not accompanied by the dreary shade of the Osage warrior at whose hands he fell."

After more negotiations, the agreed upon reparations were $2 per family head, annuity goods $300, and just 6 ponies, the latter paid by the Governor himself. The matter of payment was ingenious. The gathering of Osages was supposed to be for the U.S. government to pay the Osages their allotments. That gave the assistant Superintendent Beede the opportunity to hand out each and every tribe member his annuity payment, announcing after each allotment: "...and two dollars for the Wichitas" as he placed the money in the fund for them.

=== Retrospectives and 20th century scalp lore ===
Colonel Gould Hyde Norton of the Kansas Cavalry, a founder and merchant of Arkansas City, Kansas visited the Osage on several occasions in 1872 to '73 for trading in buffalo hides and other goods; his brother Professor Henry Brace Norton reported to the local newspaper on Osage Indian activities. In 1873, he helped them write the paperwork for a treaty with the Pawnee. Norton (Note: It is unknown which Norton wrote the news reports, with some signed as "The Arkansas Traveler" (possibly Henry) and others with "N" (possibly Gould). Both men were involved in Arkansas City mercantile, political, and news reporting activities. A town nearby wondered the identity of one Norton, asking its readers in Arkansas City: "Will the Traveler please tell us who its 'special contributor' is—whether he is the 'H. B. Norton' that lives 'in Arkansas City' or the 'H. B. Norton' that lives 'adjacent' thereto. We would like to know for our own information which it is." Winfield Messenger, November 8, 1872. From Norton Brothers, Cowley County Historical Society.) reported in 1874 that the killer was likely Wasashe Watiankah (Norton says this means "The Darling Osage") of the Big Hills band, with Ah-humkemi (the half-breed known as Bill Conner) of the Sentinel or Little Osages as his assistant. Norton and other contemporary accounts state that the Wichitas collected $1,500 for the killing of Chief Esadowa. Norton had previously reported on the scalping of a Pawnee warrior by Bill Conner (Osage name Ah-hun-ke-mi) of the Big Hill band that occurred in February 1873. The scalp dance after the Pawnee's killing had included several days of elaborate rituals and the severed hand of the warrior.

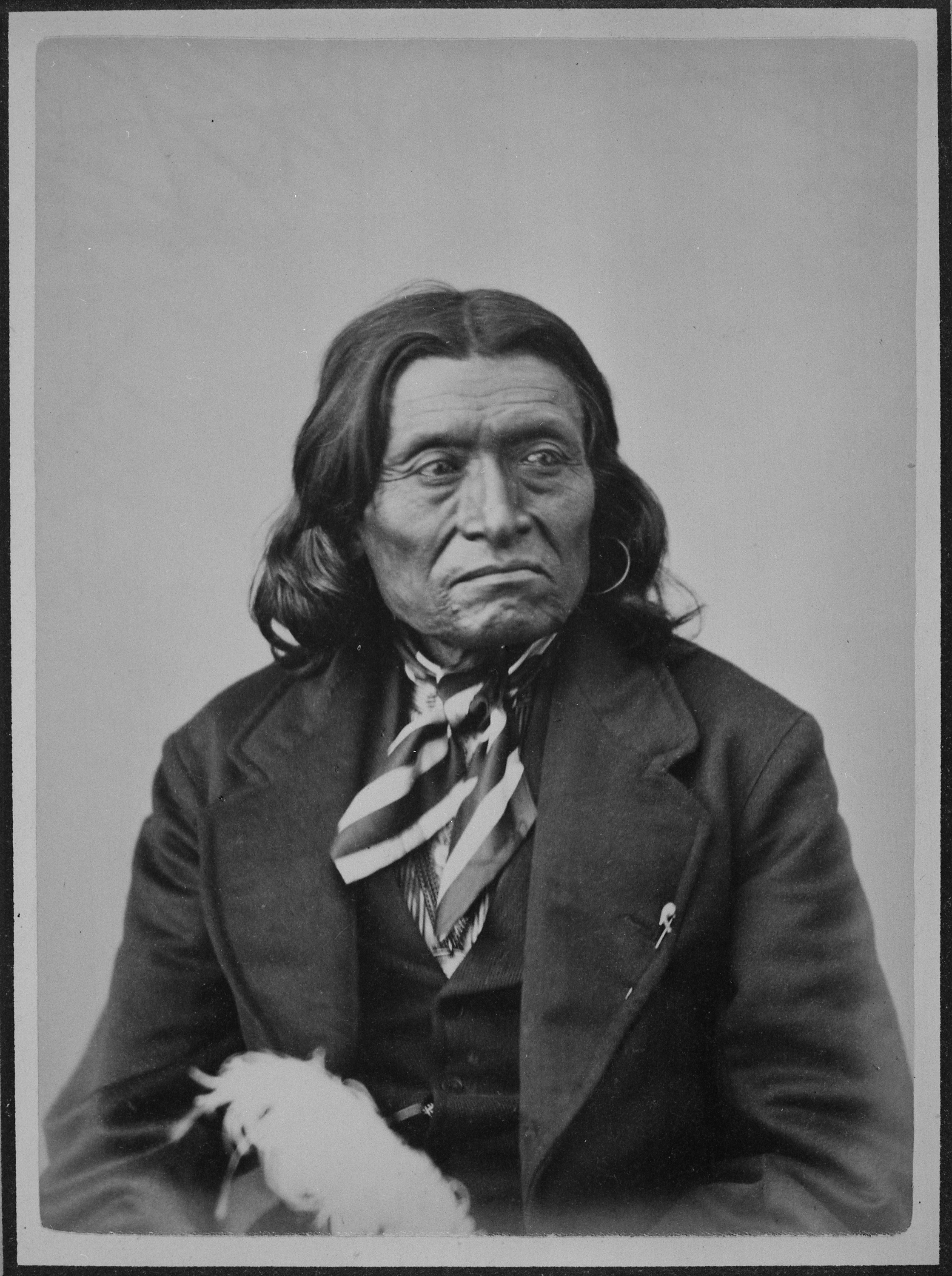
Principal Chief Esadowa of the Wichitas, one of three men murdered and scalped by the Osage in 1873. His scalp was placed inside Chief Nick's tomb. Photo taken in 1872.

In his telling of events, Norton says the Black Dogs, envious of the other Osage bands with a new scalp, sent out a scalp party in June (news reports say that it happened on May 12th or 31st, 1873) to raid cattlemen on their drive. The mourning party of about twelve Osages returned with the scalp of a man named Ed Chambers, a white cattle drover who was out on the Ellsworth trail with Messrs. Earle and Trailer working J.W. Tucker's herd. Two of Chambers's companions survived the ordeal by driving off the Osage with guns.

Newspapers in 1903 and onward reported on the legendary scalping of the Wichita chief, which became part of Osage Nation lore. The Osage warrior named as Wah-sah-she-wah-tian-kah had promised to give a scalp of an enemy to an uncle in mourning. He and eight companions including Bill Conner (alternate spelling Connor) went to the mouth of Turkey Creek on the Cimarron River in 1874 [sic], seeking an enemy to scalp. Finding a Wichita chief named A-sa-wah [i.e., Esadowa] hunting bison alone, he approached on horseback, armed with a gun, with his companions forming a distraction. The victim, attempting at first to prevent the Osage from spoiling his hunt, and then realizing their intentions, was unable to flee from Wah-sah-she-wah-tian-kah, who shot him in the back.

Wah-sah-she-wah-tian-kah and companions decapitated the chief, scalped him, and returned to the Osage reservation with the scalp, but this immediately started an investigation that would likely lead to war between the two tribes. The two had not previously been at war.

The Wichita defused the situation by preventing Wah-sah-she-wah-tian-kah from standing trial for murder in U.S courts. Deputy U.S. marshals from Fort Smith had come to arrest and imprison him, which would surely end in a hanging. Early reports indicated a desire to enlist the Arapahoes and Cheyennes in the war against the much larger and stronger Osage. The Osage leadership, for their part, desired to have the marauders punished, while the Osage Agency and Agent Gibson began investigating the situation to begin determining damages inflicted.

The Wichita instead exacted reparations of money and merchandise following the trial, listed as "blankets, moccasins, calicoes, and groceries." In the 20th century retelling of the events, the amount of money involved was reportedly $2,500 or $4,800, while earlier reports were lower. This appeasement of the Wichita kept Wah-sah-she-wah-tian-kah alive and unpunished as an individual. It also ended the threat of war between the two tribes, both of which were becoming civilized and leaving their former warlike culture behind.

After the reparations were paid, the Osage and Wichita smoked a peace pipe. A truce was established at Bird Creek, Oklahoma, and the tribes decreed that they would end funeral scalping. Although the legend would say that this was the last funeral scalping by an Osage, earlier evidence (e.g. by Norton and other reports of the killing of cattleman Ed Chambers) and further rumors persisted that it was not.

Other stories in the 1920s surfaced, with the former wife of Augustus "Ogeese" Captaine saying that it was the half-breed Bill Connor who killed the chief. Jane's recollection was that Connor became a renegade, avoiding the Osage Agency at Pawhuska. This conflicts with the stories published by Norton in 1873-74; he witnessed Bill Conner with the scalp of a Pawnee in February, which was several months before the Wichita chief was killed in May in which he names a different perpetrator. Two separate accounts say that Bill Conner was, however, an accomplice of the Osage man who killed the Wichita Chief.

The scalp of Chief Esadowa reappeared 50 years later, being put in Ne-kah-wah-she-tun-kah's tomb during the traditional Osage ceremony. It is unknown why Chief Ne-kah-wah-she-tun-kah and his burial ceremony became involved with this scalp; however, dancing around a bag of scalps at a funeral was a former practice of the Osage that officially ended in 1873 due to the taking of this exact scalp and that the senior chieftain would be the holder of a band or tribe's ceremonial scalp bag. He was the brother of the governor who led the negotiations in the aftermath; he was also connected to the Osage Nation as its principal leader. A tribute to the last hereditary chief of the Osage stated that he "clung steadfastly to the old traditions," carried his scalping knife to the grave, and had a favorite story about Osages battling Cherokees in Oklahoma, returning with many scalps.

== Works cited ==
- Wilson, Terry P. (1985). The Underground Reservation: Osage Oil. Lincoln and London: University of Nebraska Press. ISBN 0803247338.
