= Chetopa Creek =

Stream in Kansas, U.S.

Coordinates: 37.437281°N 95.669147°W

Chetopa Creek is a stream in Wilson County, Kansas and Neosho County, Kansas, in the United States. It is a tributary to the Verdigris River.

The Osage Indians made settlement near Chetopa Creek. Chetopa Creek was named for Che-to-pah, an Osage chief and counselor.

== See also ==
- List of rivers of Kansas
