= Great Father and Great Mother =

Term for European heads of state in North America

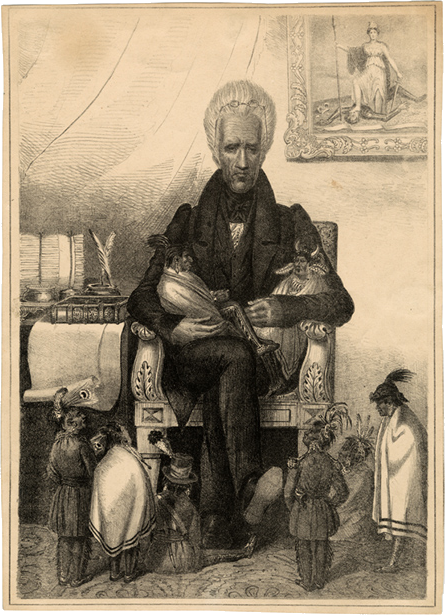
A lithograph, circa 1835, showing Andrew Jackson as the "Great Father" caring for Native Americans, who are depicted as children.

Great Father and Great Mother (French: Bon Père, Grand-Mère, Spanish: Gran Padre, Gran Madre) were titles used by European colonial powers in North America along with the United States during the 19th century to refer to the U.S. President, the King of Great Britain, the King of Spain, or the King of France during interactions with indigenous peoples. The expansion to Great White Father may have been popularized by western adventure novels.

== History ==
First Nations peoples and Native Americans most often organized themselves by clan and family; ties of kinship were considered central to intertribal relations and the understanding of tribal political power. In the Iroquois Confederacy, for instance, the relations between individual bands were metaphorically described using paternal (parent to child), or fraternal (sibling to sibling) terms to indicate the importance of two groups in relation to each other. Within this context, and to make themselves better understood during treaty negotiations, British representatives often referred to Jehovah (aka God or the Lord) as "the Great Father" (see: Great Spirit).

The terms was also used to refer to the British monarchs George III and Queen Victoria as "the Great Father" and "the Great White Mother" respectively, and to the native people as his or her "Red Children." David Laird invoked the phrase while explaining Treaty 7 to the Blackfoot:

"The Great Spirit has made all things—the sun, the moon, and the stars, the earth, the forest, and the swift running rivers. It is by the Great Spirit that the Queen rules over this great country and other great countries. The Great Spirit has made the white man and the red man brothers, and we should take each other by the hand. The Great Mother loves all her children, white man and red man alike; she wishes to do them all good."

The anthropologist Raymond DeMallie has explained that – due to the nature of Native American society – the use of kinship terms such as "Great Father" and "Great Mother" was a cunning diplomatic tactic, and not an assertion of Native inferiority. In many cases the representatives who negotiated treaties on behalf of the "Great Father" referred to themselves as the "brothers" of indigenous peoples; among some tribes it was a grave offense to refuse anything to a brother.

In the United States, the primacy of the Great Father was promoted through elaborate displays of military pageantry, the use of mystical language to describe the far-removed President, and the distribution of "peace medals" bearing the portrait of the sitting head of state (giving gifts, such as peace medals, further reinforced the paternal nature of the relationship as gift giving, in many Native cultures, was typically reserved for parent-child interaction). As in Canada, Native peoples were referred to as the "children" of the Great Father; so intense was the myth created surrounding him that chiefs brought to Washington, D.C. to meet the President often manifested symptoms of terror prior to an audience. Lean Bear, upon being presented to Abraham Lincoln at the White House, reportedly found himself suddenly unable to speak. Winnebago chief Hoowaneka recalled his audience with John Quincy Adams by explaining "I thought I was in heaven, and the old man there, I thought was the Great Spirit."

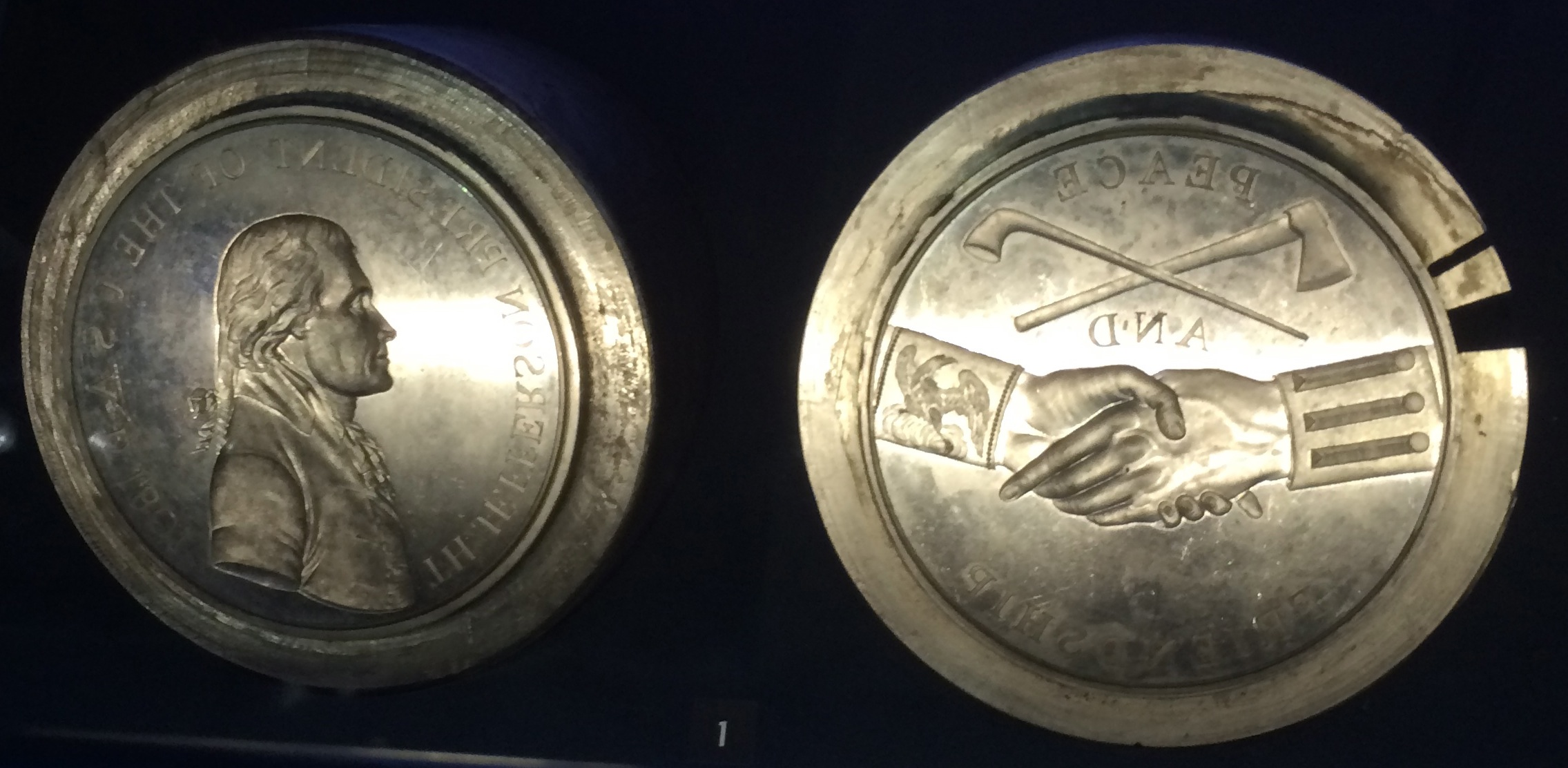
The profile of Thomas Jefferson is featured on an 1801 peace medal.

An example of an invocation of the term "Great Father" by an American official can be found in a decree given by Thomas L. McKenney to the Menominee, in which McKenney declares he has received instructions from the Great Father to appoint a head chief with whom the United States could negotiate.

"Your Great Father, who lives in the Great Village towards the rising sun, has heard confused sounds from the lands where his Menominee children hunt. He thinks it is because there are too many mouths here and that all speak at once. He wants one mouth, that he may hear more distinctly, and one pair of eyes to see through, and a pair of ears to hear for him. He said to me – go, select from my Menominee children the best man and make him chief. Give him good things. Put a medal around his neck, and a robe over his shoulders, and give him a flag ... tell him the Great Father takes him fast by the hand today, and that this medal unites them. "

On occasions when territory would pass from the influence of one Western nation to another, the new power might refer to the former Great Father in the past tense, as when William Henry Harrison addressed the Shawnee, declaring that "my children, let us look back to times that are past. It has been a long time since you called the King of Great Britain your father." In the United States, additional titles would sometimes be invoked to explain the political authority of the President to Native Americans, often as a "chief" of many "fires" (fire used as a metonym for state). In 1791, for instance, Henry Knox greeted the Miami on behalf of "General Washington, the Great Chief of the Thirteen Fires," while John Adams would come to be known to the same tribe as the "Great Chief of the Seventeen Fires."

== See also ==
- Folklore of the United States
- Tecumseh's curse
