= Edmond Atkin =

US Indian Superintendent

Edmond Atkin (1707 – October 1761) was the Imperial Indian Superintendent of the southern department in the Thirteen Colonies from 1756 to 1761.

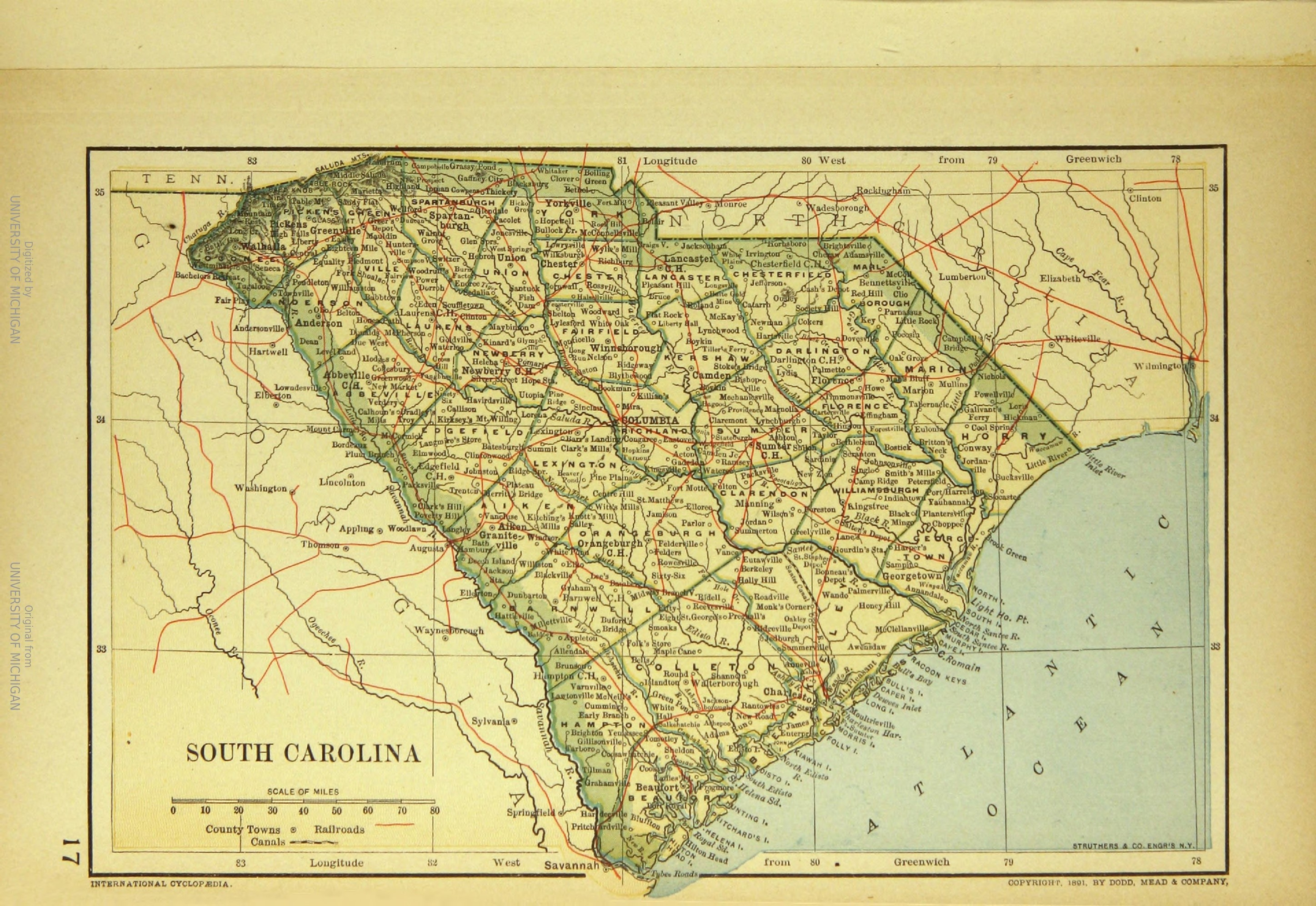
South Carolina

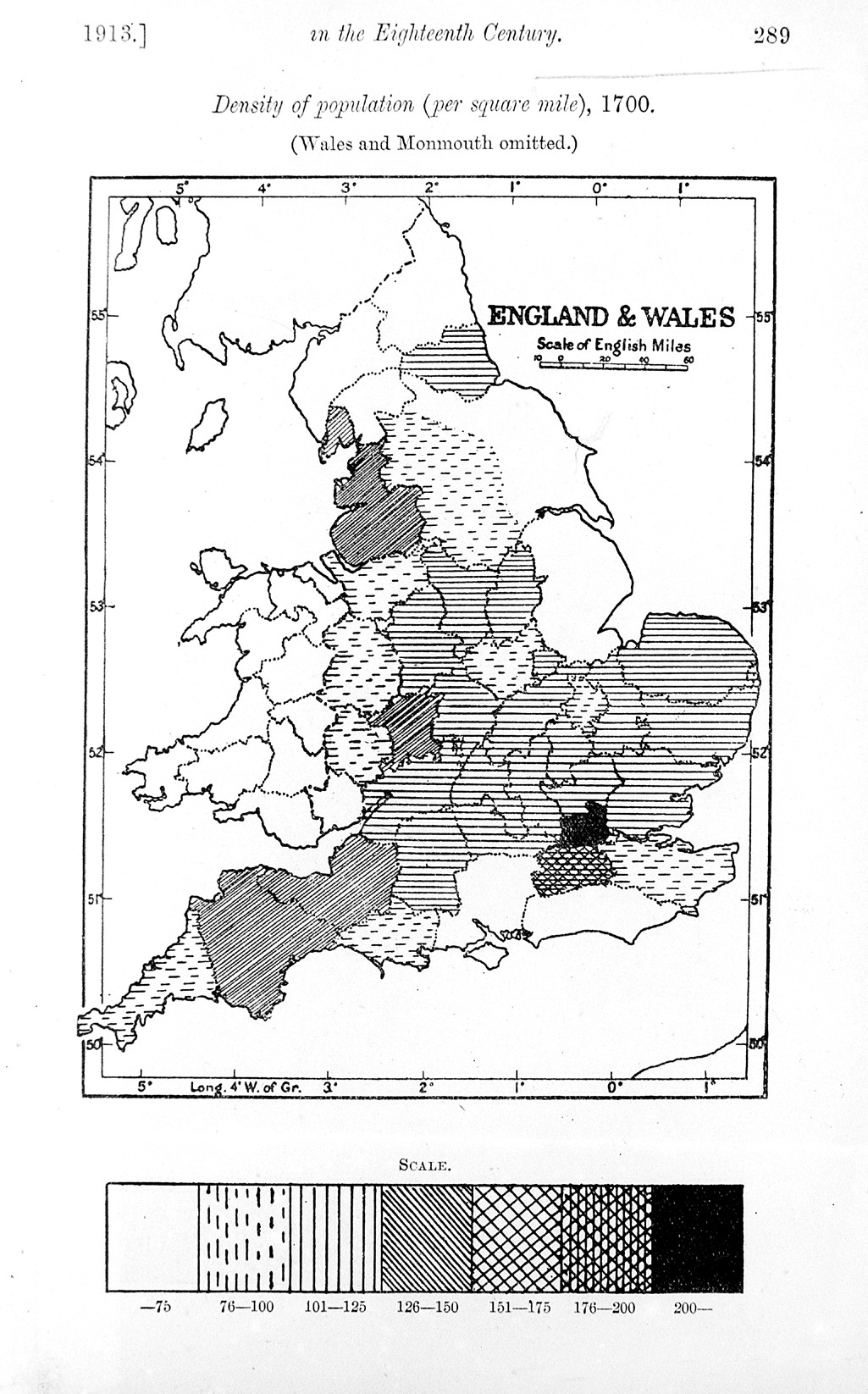
England and Wales Map, 1700s

== Early life ==
Edmond Atkin was born in 1707. He was born in England but lived in South Carolina for the majority of his life, including some of his childhood.

== Career and life ==
Edmond Atkin was a merchant in Charleston, South Carolina who participated in the Indian trade for around twenty years. Atkin was successful when it came to his trading business. His success was noted by the South Carolina Governor's council which offered him a seat. Atkin served as part of the South Carolina council since 1738 and kept his seat on the council until he was appointed Superintendent.

Atkin was the first Imperial Indian Superintendent of the South, appointed in 1756. He dealt with different tribes in the South, such as the Cherokee, the Creek and many more. Atkin served as Superintendent of the south from 1756 to 1761. His appointment as Imperial Indian Superintendent followed after showing special interest in Native Americans and because of his experience in the South Carolina council. His special interest was shown after he submitted a report which recommended how to deal with Native American affairs and how to gain control to the Board of Trade.

Edmond Atkin left to England on October, 1750 in search of more information about Indian affairs conducted in the south and their conditions. He remained part of the South Carolina council during his time in England. Atkin wrote two significant reports during his time in England. One of his reports described and included the history of the Choctaw revolt of 1746 which he finished writing in 1753. His second report outlined how to gain control of Indian affairs. This was known as the Edmond Atkin Report and Plan of 1755.

== Edmond Atkin Report and Plan of 1755 ==
The Edmond Atkin Report and Plan of 1755 was submitted to the Board of Trade on May 30, 1755. The report was detailed and contained information regarding the conditions of the Indian frontier. The report describes the management of Indian Affairs in North America. The report also mentions how trade relations between the British and Natives have not been satisfactory, and he explains why the French managed to have efficient relations with the Natives.
