= List of Osage Nation chiefs =

An Osage Nation chief is a leader of the Osage Nation. Historically, chiefs were hereditary and the tribe was made up of various sub-chiefs under a primary chief. Today, the Osage Nation has two chiefs: the Principal Chief of the Osage Nation and the assistant chief.

== Background ==
By the 1800s, the Osage Nation was divided into two major groups: the Little Osages and the Grand Osage. The Little Osages had one village and the Grand Osage had four (the Big Hills, the Heart Stays, the Thorny Thickets, and the Upland Forests). Each village was divided into Tzi-Sho (sky people) and Hunkah (land people) and each group had a chief, meaning at any one time the Osage would have about 10 chiefs. The hereditary chiefs of the Upland Forest served as the "titular chief" and was in charge of foreign relations.

When the last hereditary chief died in 1869, the Osage Nation was in need of a new government. The United States Osage Agent, Cyrus Beede, encouraged the Osage to form an elected form of government. In 1878, the Osage Nation held its first democratic election for a tribal leader. Joseph Pawnee-no-pashe was elected the first "governor" of the Osage Nation and won re-election in 1880.

Due to various issues, the tribe reconvened in 1881 and created the 1881 Osage Nation Constitution. The 1881 constitution created the office of Principal Chief and Assistant Chief and established biennial elections for the offices.

== Early Osage chiefs (Pre-1878) ==
- Black Dog (Osage chief)
- Rosana Chouteau, first woman chief and only woman elected in the Osage Nation prior to a written constitution
- Claremore (Osage chief)
- Che-to-pah
- Little Bear (Osage chief)
- Strike Axe
- Kihegashugah
- White Hair
- Hard Rope Wah-si-see-kah (1847-1927), armor-bearer to Ne-kah-wah-she-tun-kah

== Other leaders in the 19th century ==
- Bill Conner, Ah-hun-ke-mi Ah-humkemi, (1846 to 1899) a half-breed and translator, was known to be active with his assistance to Agent Gibson in the 1870s. He later served as a lawyer in Indian Territory. He was implicated in the scalping of a Pawnee warrior in 1873.
- Augustus "Ogeese" Captaine

== Osage Governor (1878-1881) ==
- Joseph Pawnee-no-pashe served two terms as the only Governor of the Osage Nation and was known as "Governor Joe."

== Principal Chief of the Osage Nation (1881-present) ==
- Joseph Pawnee-no-pashe (1882–1883), a.k.a. "Governor Joe," died in office
- Strike Axe (1883-?)
- Black Dog II (1898 winner, in office 1899-1900)
- Ne-kah-wah-she-tun-kah (1900–1902) (brother of Governor Joe)
- James Bigheart (1903–1904)
- O-lo-hah-wal-la (1906–1907)
- A. H. Brown (1910–1911)
- Bacon Rind (1912–1913)
- Fred Lookout (1913–1914)
- Fred Lookout (1916–1918)
- Arthur Bonnicastle (1920–1922)
- Ne-kah-wah-she-tun-kah (1922–1923), died in office
- Paul Red Eagle (1923–1924)
- Fred Lookout (1924–1949)
- John Oberly (1949-1951)
- Paul Pitts (1951-1970)
- Sylvester Tinker (1970–1982)
- George Tall Chief (1982-1990)
- Charles O. Tillman (1990–2002)
- James Roan Gray (2002–2010)
- John Red Eagle (2010–2014), impeached and barred from future office
- Scott Bighorse (2014)
- Geoffrey Standing Bear (2014–2026)
- Joe Tillman (2026–present)

== Assistant chief of the Osage Nation (1881-present) ==
- Strike Axe (1882–1883)
- James Bigheart (1900–1902)
- Shun-kah-mo-lah (1903–1904)
- Bacon Rind (1904–1905)
- Henry Red Eagle (Osage chief) (1912–1913)
- Paul Red Eagle (1916–1920)
- Louis Bighorse (1920-1922)
- Paul Red Eagle (1922–1923)
- John Red Eagle (2006–2010)
- Scott Bighorse (2010–2014)
- Terry Mason Moore (2014)
- Raymond W. RedCorn III (2014-2022)
- RJ Walker (2022–2026)
- John Shaw (Osage chief) (2026–present)

== Works cited ==
- Wilson, Terry P. (1985). The Underground Reservation: Osage Oil. Lincoln and London: University of Nebraska Press. ISBN 0803247338.
