= 2024 United States elections =

- ← 2022 2023 2024 2025 2026 → Presidential election year
- Election day: November 5
- Incumbent president: ▌Joe Biden (D)
- Next Congress: 119th

Presidential election
- Partisan control: Republican gain
- Popular vote margin: Republican +1.5%
- Electoral vote
- Donald Trump (R): 312
- Kamala Harris (D): 226
- Presidential election results map. Red denotes those won by Trump/Vance, and blue denotes states won by Harris/Walz. Numbers indicate electoral votes allotted to the winner of each state or district.

Senate elections
- Overall control: Republican gain
- Seats contested: 34 of the 100 seats (33 seats of Class I + 1 special election) (Note: Including a concurrent special and regular elections in California)
- Net seat change: Republican +4
- Map of the 2024 Senate races Democratic hold Republican hold Independent hold Democratic gain Republican gain No election

House elections
- Overall control: Republican hold
- Seats contested: All 435 voting-members All 6 non-voting delegates
- Popular vote margin: Republican +2.6%
- Net seat change: Democratic +2
- Map of the 2024 House races Democratic hold Democratic gain Republican hold Republican gain

Gubernatorial elections
- Seats contested: 11 of 50 state governors 2 of 5 territorial governors
- Net seat change: 0
- Map of the 2024 gubernatorial elections Democratic hold Republican hold New Progressive hold Non-partisan; No election

Elections were held in the United States on November 5, 2024. In the presidential election, Republican former president Donald Trump, seeking a non-consecutive second term, defeated incumbent Democratic vice president Kamala Harris. Republicans also gained control of the Senate and held narrow control of the House of Representatives, winning a government trifecta for the first time since 2016.

This was the third consecutive presidential election in which the incumbent party lost the presidential election (2016, 2020, and 2024). The last time neither the presidency nor a chamber of Congress changed control was in 2012. This was also the first time since 1980 that Republicans flipped control of a chamber of Congress in a presidential year, and that Democrats were voted out after a single four-year presidential term.

Republicans capitalized on Joe Biden's age, questions about his cognitive health, and his high unpopularity in the midst of an inflation surge. Biden ran an initial reelection campaign, but it collapsed due to a poor debate performance against Trump, eventually leading to his withdrawal from the race. Meanwhile, Democrats, after an unexpectedly strong performance in the 2022 midterms, faced internal divisions over the Gaza war and Israel.

This election cycle was notable for two attempted assassinations on Donald Trump, the first in Pennsylvania, in which he was shot, and the second in Florida. This was the first time a U.S. president (current or former) had been shot at since 1981, and the first time a U.S. presidential candidate had been shot on the campaign trail since 1972. Major issues across the elections were the economy, abortion, immigration, democracy, and foreign policy. Trump became the second former president to be reelected to the presidency, after Grover Cleveland in 1892.

== Background ==
=== Indictments ===
During the 2024 election cycle, Donald Trump faced multiple criminal and civil court cases. By December 2022, one month after announcing his re-election bid, he had four criminal indictments totaling 86 felony counts. Trump and many Republicans made numerous false and misleading statements regarding Trump's criminal trials, including false claims that they are "rigged" or "election interference" orchestrated by Biden and the Democratic Party, of which there is no evidence.

On May 30, 2024, Trump was found guilty by a jury of all 34 felony counts in The People of the State of New York v. Donald J. Trump over falsifying business records for hush money payments to pornographic film star Stormy Daniels, to ensure her silence about a sexual encounter between them to influence the 2016 presidential election. This made Trump the first former U.S. president to be convicted of a crime in American history.

Trump was found liable on May 9, 2023, by an anonymous jury, in E. Jean Carroll v. Donald J. Trump for battery and defamation, and was ordered to pay a total of $88.3-million combined judgement.

In September 2023, Trump was found guilty of financial fraud in New York v. Trump and was ordered to pay a $354.8 million judgement, in which Trump appealed.

=== 14th Amendment ballot removal attempts ===
Several state courts and officials, including the Colorado Supreme Court, a state Circuit Court in Illinois, and the Secretary of State of Maine, ruled that Trump was ineligible to hold office under Section 3 of the Fourteenth Amendment to the United States Constitution for his role in the January 6 Capitol attack, and moved to disqualify him from appearing on the ballot. On March 4, 2024, the U.S. Supreme Court unanimously ruled in Trump v. Anderson that states cannot determine eligibility for a national election under Section 3, and only Congress has the authority to disqualify candidates, or to pass legislation that allows courts to do so.

== Issues ==
=== Democracy ===
Polling before the election indicated profound dissatisfaction with the state of American democracy on both sides of the electorate.

Liberals tended to believe that conservatives were threatening democracy following their attempts to overturn the 2020 election. During the election, significant debate broke out about whether Donald Trump could be considered a fascist. According to one poll conducted on October 25, 2024, 49% of Americans saw Trump as a fascist, described as "a political extremist who seeks to act as a dictator, disregards individual rights and threatens or uses force against their opponents". Meanwhile, only 22% saw Harris as a fascist by this definition.

Some Republicans were concerned that Trump's former impeachment and four criminal indictments were attempts to influence the election and keep him from office; however, there is no evidence that Trump's criminal trials were "election interference" orchestrated by Biden and the Democratic Party, and Trump also continued to repeat false claims that the 2020 election was rigged and stolen from him.

After Trump was shot at an election rally in an assassination attempt, polling soon after the event showed that one third of Americans agreed that the assassination attempt of Trump was "part of a broader plot or conspiracy", and nearly half of those polled answering "very or somewhat likely" to the idea that "The U.S. will no longer be a democracy" within 10 years.

=== Economy ===
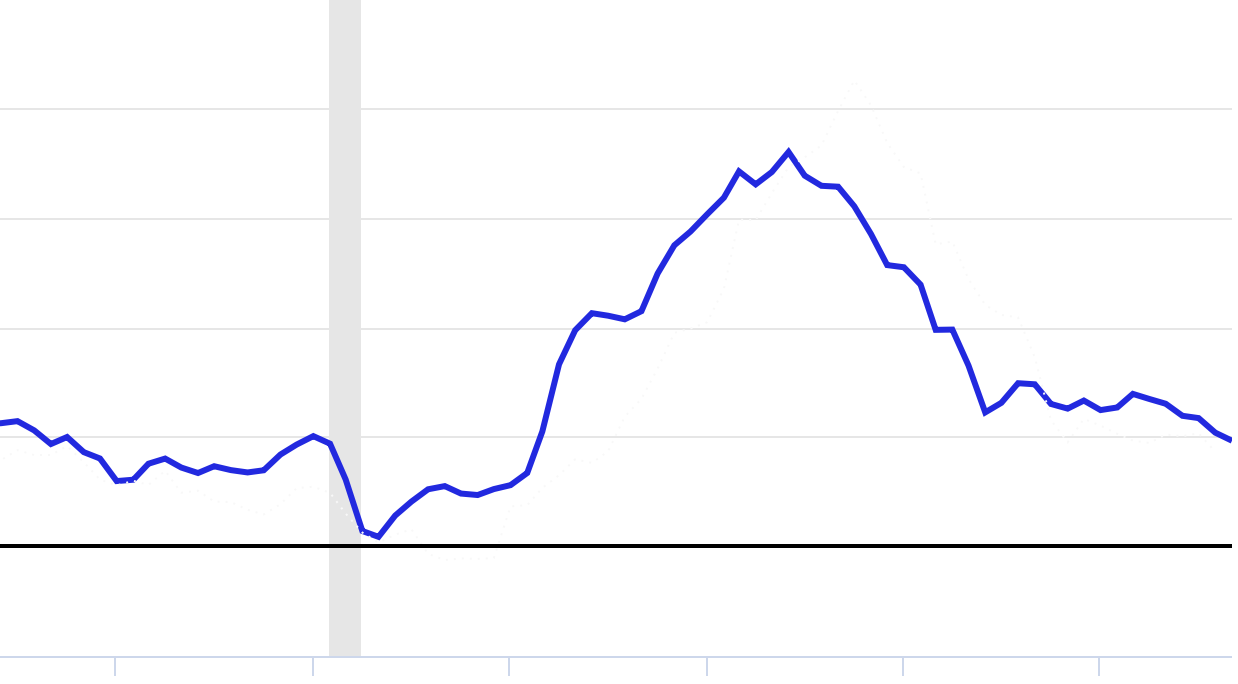
Post-COVID inflation spike in the US, with the gray column indicating the COVID-19 recession in US

Voters consistently cited the current status of the U.S. economy as their top issue in the 2024 election. Following the COVID-19 pandemic, a global surge in inflation ensued that raised prices on many goods, though the U.S. inflation rate had declined significantly during 2023 and 2024. The New York Times reported that both candidates "embraced a vision of a powerful federal government, using its muscle to intervene in markets in pursuit of a stronger and more prosperous economy."

The chief divide between the two major parties on the economy going into the election cycle were the incumbent Democrats pointing out that the economy was strong and well on its way to recovering from the effects of worldwide inflation, initially coining the term "Bidenomics", but acknowledging that goods were still too expensive and promising action to increase affordability. Republicans argued that the economy was better while they were in office, and promised to quickly bring down inflation, increase tariffs, and cut taxes and regulations.

=== Immigration ===
Border security and immigration were among the top issues concerning potential voters in the election. Polling throughout the election cycle showed that most Americans wanted to reduce immigration. Soon after President Biden assumed office in 2021, entries into the US began to rise, worsening in 2023 and early 2024 as a surge of migrants through the border with Mexico occurred, causing record high levels of illegal entry into the US. By June 2024, illegal crossings reached a three-year low following four consecutive monthly drops, which senior government officials attributed to increased enforcement between the United States and Mexico, the weather, and Biden's executive order which increased asylum restrictions, but were still higher than average numbers recorded by the former Trump administration.

=== Abortion ===
This was the first presidential election held after the overturn of Roe v. Wade, and the third overall election cycle after the 2022 midterm elections and the 2023 off-year elections. Republican-controlled states predominantly passed near-total bans on abortion in the aftermath of the Supreme Court's June 2022 Dobbs v. Jackson Women's Health Organization decision. By April 2023, abortion was "largely illegal" in several states. According to the Kaiser Family Foundation, there were 15 states that had de jure early stage bans on abortion explicitly without exceptions for rape or incest: Alabama, Arizona, Arkansas, Florida, Kentucky, Louisiana, Mississippi, Missouri, Ohio, Oklahoma, South Dakota, Tennessee, Texas, West Virginia, and Wisconsin. (Ohio voters subsequently codified abortion rights in Ohio's state constitution via November 2023 Ohio Issue 1.) In states with laws granting exceptions, it was reported de facto that "very few exceptions to these new abortion bans have been granted" and that patients who had been raped or otherwise qualified for exceptions were being turned away, citing "ambiguous laws and the threat of criminal penalties make them unwilling to test the rules".

Abortion referendums were on the ballot in 10 states in 2024: Arizona, Colorado, Florida, Maryland, Missouri, Montana, Nebraska, Nevada, New York and South Dakota.

=== Foreign relations ===
==== Gaza War ====
With the war in the Middle East between Israel and its regional neighbors under increased international scrutiny as it continued to escalate, many Americans had protested in support and in opposition to the United States continued friendship and alliance with Israel.

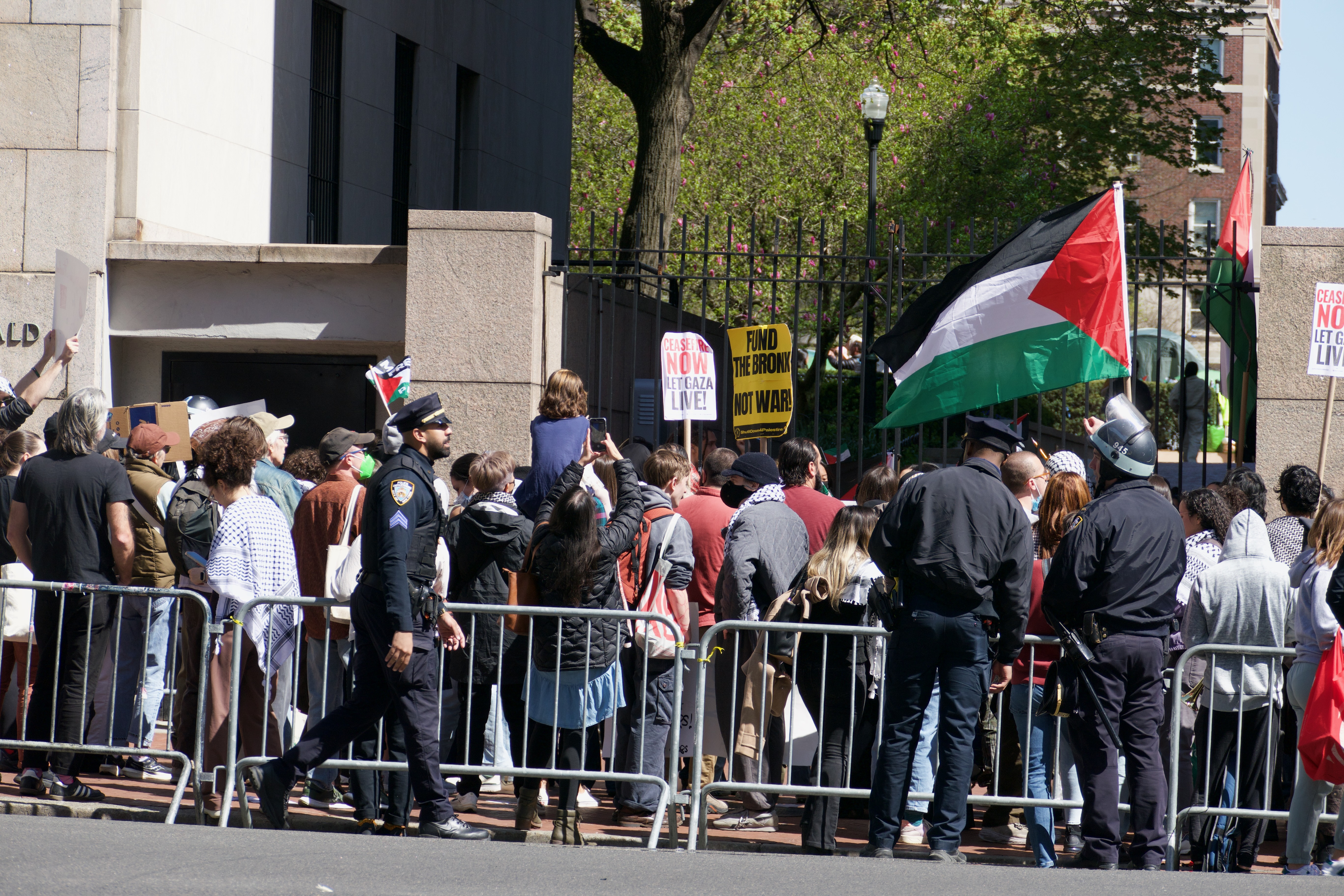
A pro-Palestine protest at Columbia University in New York

Many cities and universities experienced anti-Israeli protests calling on the US to end its support for the Israeli government and other Israeli institutions, which included calls for Americans to not support the 2024 election efforts of President Biden or Vice President Harris due to their administration's continued support for Israel. Domestic American Pro-Israel groups had meanwhile spent large sums of money to support pro-Israel candidates against candidates critical of the Israeli government. According to a campaign finance analysis by Politico, AIPAC was the "biggest source of Republican money flowing into competitive Democratic primaries this year."

== Federal elections ==
=== Presidential election ===
The 2024 United States presidential election was the 60th quadrennial U.S. presidential election. This was the first presidential election under the electoral vote distribution based upon the 2020 census. In each state, the presidential electors who actually elect the President and Vice President of the United States were chosen; a simple majority (270) of the 538 electoral votes is required to win the election.

President Joe Biden initially ran for a second term and won the primaries, with Vice President Kamala Harris once again serving as his running mate; Biden later withdrew his candidacy on July 21, 2024. Biden's withdrawal made him the first eligible incumbent president since Lyndon B. Johnson in 1968 not to seek re-election, and the first to withdraw after securing enough delegates to win the nomination. Harris is the first nominee who did not participate in the primaries since Vice President Hubert Humphrey, also in 1968. Other candidates that entered the 2024 Democratic Party presidential primaries include Representative Dean Phillips of Minnesota, self-help author Marianne Williamson, and businessman Jason Palmer, all of whom later suspended their campaigns and endorsed Biden, except Williamson who continued to suspend and un-suspend her campaign. This was the first election since 1968 in which an eligible incumbent president was not their party's nominee. After a survey by the Associated Press of Democratic delegates on July 22, 2024, Kamala Harris became the new presumptive candidate for the Democratic party, a day after declaring her candidacy. She became the official nominee on August 5 following a virtual roll call of delegates.

In November 2022, former President Donald Trump announced his candidacy in the 2024 presidential election. Other candidates who entered the 2024 Republican Party presidential primaries include former South Carolina governor and former U.S. Ambassador to the U.N. Nikki Haley and Governor Ron DeSantis of Florida, who later suspended their campaigns and endorsed Trump. The first Republican presidential debate was held on August 23, 2023, and the first primary contest was the 2024 Iowa Republican presidential caucuses, which was held on January 15, 2024. Trump won the nomination easily; he was formally nominated at the Republican Convention on July 15, his third consecutive presidential nomination.

In October 2023, Robert F. Kennedy Jr. announced his run as an independent presidential candidate. On August 23, 2024, Kennedy announced he was suspending his campaign and backing Trump. In July, intermediaries between Trump and Kennedy discussed a possible role for Kennedy in the Trump administration in return for his endorsement; a month later, Kennedy made similar overtures to the Harris campaign, but was rebuffed.

=== Congressional elections ===
==== Senate elections ====
Control of Senate seats by class after the 2024 elections
Class	Democratic	Independent	Republican	Next elections
1	17	2	14	2030
2	13	0	20	2026
3	15	0	19	2028
Total	45	2 (Note: Bernie Sanders and Angus King are Independents but caucus with the Senate Democrats and are counted with them.)	53	—N/a

All 33 seats in Senate Class 1 and one seat in Senate Class 2 were up for election; two additional special elections took place to fill vacancies that arose during the 118th Congress. Democrats controlled the majority in the closely divided Senate following the 2022 U.S. Senate elections, but they had to defend 23 seats in 2024. Three Democratic-held seats up for election were in the heavily Republican-leaning states of Montana, Ohio, and West Virginia, all of which were won comfortably by Trump in both 2016 and 2020. Republicans won a net of four Senate seats, defending all of their previously-held seats while picking up seats in Montana, Ohio, West Virginia, and Pennsylvania.

==== Special elections in the Senate ====
Two special elections were held to fill the unexpired terms of senators who vacated their seats during the 118th Congress:

- Nebraska Class 2: Republican Ben Sasse resigned his seat on January 8, 2023, to become President of the University of Florida. Pete Ricketts was appointed by Nebraska governor Jim Pillen to fill the seat until the special election, which took place concurrently with the regularly scheduled 2024 Senate elections.
- California Class 1: Democrat Dianne Feinstein died on September 29, 2023. Laphonza Butler was appointed by California governor Gavin Newsom to fill the seat until the special election, which took place concurrently with the regular election for a six-year term.

==== House of Representatives elections ====
All 435 voting seats in the United States House of Representatives were up for election. Additionally, elections were held to select the non-voting members who represent the District of Columbia and all five permanently inhabited U.S. territories in the House of Representatives. Republicans held a narrow majority in the House of Representatives following the 2022 U.S. House elections. Democrats won a net of two seats but Republicans retained a narrow majority in the House, leading to the re-election of Mike Johnson in the 2025 Speaker of the United States House of Representatives election.

==== Special elections in the House of Representatives ====
Eight special elections to the House of Representatives were held in 2024.

- New York's 3rd congressional district: Democrat Tom Suozzi defeated Republican Mazi Melesa Pilip to succeed Republican George Santos, who was expelled on December 1, 2023, for making false biographical statements and alleged misuse of campaign funds. The district has a partisan index of D+2.
- New York's 26th congressional district: Democrat Tim Kennedy defeated Republican Gary Dickson to succeed Democrat Brian Higgins, who resigned on February 2, 2024, to become President of Shea's Performing Arts Center. The district has a partisan index of D+9.
- California's 20th congressional district: Republican Vince Fong defeated Republican Mike Boudreaux to succeed Republican Kevin McCarthy, who resigned on December 31, 2023, after his removal as Speaker of the House. The district has a partisan index of R+16.
- Ohio's 6th congressional district: Republican Michael Rulli defeated Democrat Michael Kripchak to succeed Republican Bill Johnson, who resigned on January 21, 2024, to become President of Youngstown State University. The district has a partisan index of R+16.
- Colorado's 4th congressional district: Republican Greg Lopez defeated Democrat Trisha Calvarese to succeed Republican Ken Buck, who resigned on March 22, 2024, due to dissatisfaction with the current Congress. The district has a partisan index of R+13.
- New Jersey's 10th congressional district: Democrat LaMonica McIver defeated Republican Carmen Bucco to succeed Democrat Donald Payne Jr., who died on April 24, 2024, from complications following a heart attack. The district has a partisan index of D+30.
- Texas's 18th congressional district: Democrat Erica Lee Carter defeated Republicans Maria Dunn and Kevin Dural to succeed Democrat Sheila Jackson Lee, who died on July 19, 2024, from pancreatic cancer. The district has a partisan index of D+23.
- Wisconsin's 8th congressional district: Republican Tony Wied defeated Democrat Kristin Lyerly to succeed Republican Mike Gallagher, who resigned on April 24, 2024, following the first impeachment vote against Homeland Security Secretary Alejandro Mayorkas. The district has a partisan index of R+10.

== State elections ==
Partisan control of state governments following the 2024 elections: Democratic trifecta maintained Republican trifecta maintained Divided government established Divided government maintained Officially non-partisan, unicameral legislature

Republicans made minor gains in state elections in 2024. They broke two Democratic trifectas, one in Michigan and the other in Minnesota, made minor legislative gains across the country, and flipped three major statewide offices.

=== Gubernatorial elections ===
Elections were held for the governorships of eleven of the fifty U.S. states and two U.S. territories. No gubernatorial offices changed partisan control.

=== Lieutenant gubernatorial elections ===
5 states held lieutenant governor elections. Democrats flipped the lieutenant governor's office in North Carolina, while Republicans flipped Vermont's.

=== Attorney general elections ===
10 states held attorney general elections. Republicans flipped the attorney general's office in Pennsylvania.

=== Secretary of state elections ===
7 states held secretary of state elections. No secretary of state offices changed partisan control.

=== State treasurer elections ===
10 states held state treasurer elections. No state treasurer offices changed partisan control.

=== State auditor elections ===
8 states and one territory held state auditor elections. Republicans flipped the state auditor's office in North Carolina.

=== Legislative elections ===
Most legislative chambers held regularly scheduled elections in 2024. The exceptions are the Michigan Senate, Minnesota Senate, and both legislative chambers in the states of Alabama, Louisiana, Maryland, Mississippi, New Jersey, and Virginia. In chambers that use staggered terms, only a portion of the seats in the chamber were up for election.

Republicans made mild legislative gains across the country, gaining control of the Michigan House of Representatives and forcing a tie in the Minnesota House of Representatives. Democrats made substantial gains in the Montana Legislature and Wisconsin Legislature due to favorable redistricting, but they did not flip control of any chambers.

=== Other executive and judicial elections ===
In addition to gubernatorial elections, various other executive and judicial positions held elections at the state level in 2024.

=== Ballot measures ===
147 ballot measures in 41 states were held in the November general elections.

== Local elections ==
=== Mayoral elections ===
Several major U.S. cities held elections for the office of mayor throughout 2024. Several saw incumbent mayors re-elected, including Phoenix, Arizona (Kate Gallego); Bakersfield (Karen Goh), Costa Mesa (John Stephens), Fresno (Jerry Dyer), Riverside (Patricia Lock Dawson), San Diego (Todd Gloria), and San Jose, California (Matt Mahan); Bridgeport, Connecticut (Joe Ganim); Miami-Dade County, Florida (Daniella Levine Cava); Honolulu, Hawaii (Rick Blangiardi); Baltimore, Maryland (Brandon Scott); Austin (Kirk Watson) and Corpus Christi, Texas (Paulette Guajardo); Salt Lake County, Utah (Jenny Wilson); Virginia Beach, Virginia (Bobby Dyer); Milwaukee, Wisconsin (Cavalier Johnson); and Cheyenne, Wyoming (Patrick Collins). Riverside's mayoral election was the first time since 2009 that it did not go to a runoff election.

Several cities elected new mayors in open contests, including Fairbanks North Star Borough, Alaska (Grier Hopkins); Mesa, Arizona (Mark Freeman); Sacramento (Kevin McCarty) and Stockton, California (Christina Fugazi); Wilmington, Delaware (John Carney); Grand Rapids, Michigan (David LaGrand); Las Vegas, Nevada (Shelley Berkley); Raleigh, North Carolina (Janet Cowell); Tulsa, Oklahoma (Monroe Nichols); Portland, Oregon (Keith Wilson); El Paso (Renard Johnson) and Lubbock, Texas (Mark McBrayer); Burlington, Vermont (Emma Mulvaney-Stanak); Alexandria (Alyia Gaskins) and Richmond, Virginia (Danny Avula); Huntington (Patrick Farrell) and Wheeling, West Virginia (Denny Magruder); and Kenosha, Wisconsin (David Bogdala).

In Pueblo, Colorado, a runoff of the 2023 election was held in January, resulting in city councilor Heather Graham defeating mayor Nick Gradisar in his bid for re-election. In Anchorage, Alaska, incumbent mayor Dave Bronson lost re-election to a second three-year term against independent Suzanne LaFrance. In San Francisco, California, philanthropist Daniel Lurie defeated incumbent mayor London Breed in a ranked-choice vote, the first election in the city to coincide with a presidential election. Nearby in Oakland, mayor Sheng Thao was ousted in a recall election two years into her term, the first mayor in the city's history to be recalled; a special election was held in 2025 and resulted in Barbara Lee being elected to complete the remainder of Thao's term. In Scottsdale, Arizona,mayor Dave Ortega lost re-election to attorney Lisa Borowsky in a rematch of the 2020 election. In Fayetteville, Arkansas, longtime mayor Lioneld Jordan lost a runoff election against Molly Rawn, the city's tourism director. In Baton Rouge, Louisiana, Sid Edwards was elected as the first Republican mayor-president of the city-parish since 2004, defeating incumbent Sharon Weston Broome in her bid for a third term.

== Tribal elections ==
In January, the Fort McDowell Yavapai Nation elected Sandra Pattea as tribal President, ousting long-term tribal leader Bernadine Burnette, who first joined the tribal council in 1992. Also in January, the Shakopee Mdewakanton Sioux Community elevated Cole Miller from vice chair to tribal chairman, Debra O'Gara was elected President of the Petersburg Indian Association in Alaska, Fred L. Romero was elected governor of the Taos Pueblo, and Craig Quanchello was named governor of the Picuris Pueblo.

In February, the Confederated Tribes of Coos, Lower Umpqua and Siuslaw Indians elected Doug Barrett tribal chief in a special election to fill the remainder of Donald "Doc" Slyter's term, which expires in April 2030. Slyter died in November 2023.

In March, the Apache Tribe of Oklahoma reelected Durell Cooper III as tribal chairman and Matthew Tselee as vice-chairman. Dustin Cozad was elected Apache Treasurer and Donald Komardley and Amber Achilta were elected to the tribe's business committee. The Peoria Tribe of Oklahoma elected Jason Dollarhide as treasurer, Carolyn Ritchey to the business committee, and Stacy Lindsly to the grievance committee.

In April, Lisa Goree was elected chair of the Shinnecock Nation on Long Island. She is the first woman to lead the tribe since 1792.

In May, Forrest Tahdooahnippah was elected as chair of the Comanche Nation, replacing Mark Woommavovah who declined to run for reelection after being censured for his approval of a refinery project on tribal land; Diana Doyebi-Sovo was elected vice-chair. The Ottawa Tribe of Oklahoma elected Mikal Scott-Werner second chief, Kallista Keah as secretary-treasurer, Cody Hollenbeck first councilman, and Rachel Marie Yeakley to the tribe's grievance committee. The Wasco, part of the Confederated Tribes of Warm Springs, elected Jefferson Greene chief in a special election. Michael Q. Primus II, Ben Lucero Wolf, Tiya "Tanequodle" Rosario, and Warren Quetone were elected to the Kiowa Tribe's legislature. The Shoshone-Bannock Tribes in Idaho elected Lee Juan Tyler as chair of the Fort Hall Business Council.

In June, the Pascua Yaqui Tribe in Arizona elected Julian Hernandez tribal council chair. The Osage Nation elected Pam Shaw, John Maker, Billy Keene, Maria Whitehorn, and Joe Tillman to the Osage Congress. Charles Diebold was reelected chief of the Seneca-Cayuga Nation while Cynthia Bauer and John White Eagle were elected to the tribe's business committee. The Iowa Tribe of Oklahoma elected Abraham Lincoln, Perri Ahhaitty, and Christie Modlin to the business committee. In a June Comanche Nation runoff, Lisa Dawsey was elected tribal administrator and law firm Crowe & Dunlevy was elected tribal attorney. Also in June, Minnesota Chippewa Tribe voters elected Bruce Savage to lead the Fond du Lac Band of Lake Superior Chippewa, and reelected Cathy Chavers as head of the Bois Forte Band of Chippewa, Faron Jackson Sr. of the Leech Lake Band of Ojibwe, and Michael Fairbanks of the White Earth Nation. Grand Portage Band of Chippewa chairperson Robert Deschampe was unopposed. The sixth group in the tribe, the Mille Lacs Band of Ojibwe, elected Virgil Wind chief executive in April when he won the primary election outright with more than 50 percent of the vote. Wind succeeded Melanie Benjamin who decided not to run for a seventh term.

In July, the Chickasaw Nation reelected David Woerz, Toby Perkins, Nancy Elliott, Shana Tate Darter, and Scott Wood to the tribe's legislature and Linda English Weeks to the tribe's supreme court. Matthew Wesaw was reelected to a fourth term as chair of the Pokagon Band of Potawatomi Indians tribal council.

In August, Kathleen Wooden Knife won an open-seat race to become the first woman elected President of the Rosebud Sioux Tribe.

In October, Lac du Flambeau Band of Lake Superior Chippewa voters reelected tribal President John Johnson, and the Kickapoo Tribe in Kansas reelected Gail Cheatham as chairperson.

In November, Gene Small was elected President of the Northern Cheyenne Tribe, narrowly defeating incumbent Serena Wetherelt; Ernest Littlemouth Sr. was elected vice President. The Crow Tribe reelected Frank White Clay as tribal chair; Chippewa Cree Business Committee Chair Harlan Baker was also reelected.

=== Referendums ===
In January, three proposed Cheyenne and Arapaho Tribes constitutional amendments failed after only 11.3% of voters returned ballots, short of the 30% voter turnout required for constitutional amendments to pass by the tribe's constitution.

In June, the Cherokee Nation rejected a referendum calling for a constitutional convention to amend or replace the tribe's constitution by a margin of 69.5% to 30.5%. Also in June, the Osage Nation voters approved 76.9% to 23.1% a constitutional amendment allowing the Osage Congress to reject executive appointees during a special session. A Kiowa Tribe referendum scheduled for June that would have raised citizens' blood quantum was cancelled. A measure to approve opening of a retail cannabis dispensary on the Confederated Tribes of Warm Springs reservation was not approved due to low voter turnout; the measure received approval from a majority of voters, but it required the approval of one-third of all eligible voters.

In July, Seneca Nation voters rejected a referendum to establish a tribal police department.

In October, the Yurok Tribe voted in favor of removing blood quantum requirements for membership with a descent-based tribal membership in an advisory referendum. The Yurok tribal council will decide whether or not to amend membership requirements in the tribe's constitution.

== Territories ==
The U.S. territories of American Samoa and Puerto Rico held gubernatorial and legislative elections in 2024, while Guam, the Northern Mariana Islands, and the U.S. Virgin Islands held legislative elections. Along with Washington, D.C., each territory also held elections for a non-voting delegate to the U.S. House of Representatives. All non-voting delegates serve two-year terms, with the exception of the Resident Commissioner of Puerto Rico, a non-voting position with a four-year term. Washington, D.C., also held elections for its shadow representative and one of its two shadow senators. The five territories also took part in the 2024 Democratic Party presidential primaries and the 2024 Republican Party presidential primaries.

Republicans flipped the governorships of American Samoa and Puerto Rico in their respective elections, as well as the Legislature of Guam. Also in Puerto Rico, the pro-statehood New Progressive Party flipped both chambers of the Legislative Assembly.

== Table of state, territorial, and federal results ==
This table shows the partisan results of presidential, congressional, gubernatorial, and state legislative races held in each state and territory in 2024. Note that not all states and territories hold gubernatorial, state legislative, and Senate elections in 2024. The five territories and Washington, D.C., do not elect members of the Senate, and the territories do not take part in presidential elections; instead, they each elect one non-voting member of the House. Nebraska's unicameral legislature and the governorship and legislature of American Samoa are elected on a non-partisan basis, and political party affiliation is not listed.

State/Territory	2022 PVI	Before 2024 elections				After 2024 elections				
State/Territory	2022 PVI	Governor	State leg.	U.S. Senate	U.S. House	Pres. (Note: This column reflects the individual who won a plurality of the state's popular vote in the 2024 presidential election.)	Governor	State leg.	U.S. Senate	U.S. House
Alabama	R+15	Rep	Rep	Rep	Rep 6–1	Rep	Rep	Rep	Rep	Rep 5–2
Alaska	R+8	Rep	Coalition (Note: A coalition of 19 Republicans, 2 Democrats, and 2 Independents controlled the Alaska House of Representatives, while a grand coalition of 9 Democrats and 8 Republicans controlled the Alaska Senate.)	Rep	Dem 1–0	Rep	Rep	Coalition (Note: A coalition of 14 Democrats, 5 Independents, and 2 Republicans will control the Alaska House of Representatives, while a coalition of 9 Democrats and 5 Republicans will control the Alaska Senate.)	Rep	Rep 1–0
Arizona	R+2	Dem	Rep	Split D/I (Note: One of Arizona's senators, Mark Kelly, is a Democrat. The other senator from Arizona, Kyrsten Sinema, was elected as a Democrat but registered as an Independent in December 2022.)	Rep 6–3	Rep	Dem	Rep	Dem	Rep 6–3
Arkansas	R+16	Rep	Rep	Rep	Rep 4–0	Rep	Rep	Rep	Rep	Rep 4–0
California	D+13	Dem	Dem	Dem	Dem 40–12	Dem	Dem	Dem	Dem	Dem 43–9
Colorado	D+4	Dem	Dem	Dem	Dem 5–3	Dem	Dem	Dem	Dem	Split 4–4
Connecticut	D+7	Dem	Dem	Dem	Dem 5–0	Dem	Dem	Dem	Dem	Dem 5–0
Delaware	D+7	Dem	Dem	Dem	Dem 1–0	Dem	Dem	Dem	Dem	Dem 1–0
Florida	R+3	Rep	Rep	Rep	Rep 20–8	Rep	Rep	Rep	Rep	Rep 20–8
Georgia	R+3	Rep	Rep	Dem	Rep 9–5	Rep	Rep	Rep	Dem	Rep 9–5
Hawaii	D+14	Dem	Dem	Dem	Dem 2–0	Dem	Dem	Dem	Dem	Dem 2–0
Idaho	R+18	Rep	Rep	Rep	Rep 2–0	Rep	Rep	Rep	Rep	Rep 2–0
Illinois	D+7	Dem	Dem	Dem	Dem 14–3	Dem	Dem	Dem	Dem	Dem 14–3
Indiana	R+11	Rep	Rep	Rep	Rep 7–2	Rep	Rep	Rep	Rep	Rep 7–2
Iowa	R+6	Rep	Rep	Rep	Rep 4–0	Rep	Rep	Rep	Rep	Rep 4–0
Kansas	R+10	Dem	Rep	Rep	Rep 3–1	Rep	Dem	Rep	Rep	Rep 3–1
Kentucky	R+16	Dem	Rep	Rep	Rep 5–1	Rep	Dem	Rep	Rep	Rep 5–1
Louisiana	R+12	Rep	Rep	Rep	Rep 5–1	Rep	Rep	Rep	Rep	Rep 4–2
Maine	D+2	Dem (Note: Three of Maine's electoral votes were called for Biden, while one of its electoral votes was called for Trump.)	Dem	Split R/I (Note: One of Maine's senators, Susan Collins, is a Republican. The other senator from Maine, Angus King, is an independent who has caucused with Democrats since taking office in 2013.)	Dem 2–0	Dem (Note: Three of Maine's electoral votes were called for Harris, while one of its electoral votes was called for Trump.)	Dem	Dem	Split R/I	Dem 2–0
Maryland	D+14	Dem	Dem	Dem	Dem 7–1	Dem	Dem	Dem	Dem	Dem 7–1
Massachusetts	D+15	Dem	Dem	Dem	Dem 9–0	Dem	Dem	Dem	Dem	Dem 9–0
Michigan	R+1	Dem	Dem	Dem	Dem 7–6	Rep	Dem	Split	Dem	Rep 7–6
Minnesota	D+1	Dem	Dem	Dem	Split 4–4	Dem	Dem	Split (Note: The Minnesota House of Representatives became evenly split 67–67 following the election, with a power-sharing agreement between the parties. The Minnesota Senate remained controlled by Democrats.)	Dem	Split 4–4
Mississippi	R+11	Rep	Rep	Rep	Rep 3–1	Rep	Rep	Rep	Rep	Rep 3–1
Missouri	R+10	Rep	Rep	Rep	Rep 6–2	Rep	Rep	Rep	Rep	Rep 6–2
Montana	R+11	Rep	Rep	Split	Rep 2–0	Rep	Rep	Rep	Rep	Rep 2–0
Nebraska	R+13	Rep (Note: Four of Nebraska's electoral votes were called for Trump, while one of its electoral votes was called for Biden.)	NP/R (Note: Though a majority of its members identify as Republicans, the unicameral Nebraska Legislature is officially nonpartisan.)	Rep	Rep 3–0	Rep (Note: Four of Nebraska's electoral votes were called for Trump, while one of its electoral votes was called for Harris.)	Rep	NP/R	Rep	Rep 3–0
Nevada	R+1	Rep	Dem	Dem	Dem 3–1	Rep	Rep	Dem	Dem	Dem 3–1
New Hampshire	D+1	Rep	Rep	Dem	Dem 2–0	Dem	Rep	Rep	Dem	Dem 2–0
New Jersey	D+6	Dem	Dem	Dem	Dem 9–3	Dem	Dem	Dem	Dem	Dem 9–3
New Mexico	D+3	Dem	Dem	Dem	Dem 3–0	Dem	Dem	Dem	Dem	Dem 3–0
New York	D+10	Dem	Dem	Dem	Dem 16–10	Dem	Dem	Dem	Dem	Dem 19–7
North Carolina	R+3	Dem	Rep	Rep	Split 7–7	Rep	Dem	Rep	Rep	Rep 10–4
North Dakota	R+20	Rep	Rep	Rep	Rep 1–0	Rep	Rep	Rep	Rep	Rep 1–0
Ohio	R+6	Rep	Rep	Split	Rep 10–5	Rep	Rep	Rep	Rep	Rep 10–5
Oklahoma	R+20	Rep	Rep	Rep	Rep 5–0	Rep	Rep	Rep	Rep	Rep 5–0
Oregon	D+6	Dem	Dem	Dem	Dem 4–2	Dem	Dem	Dem	Dem	Dem 5–1
Pennsylvania	R+2	Dem	Split	Dem	Dem 9–8	Rep	Dem	Split	Split	Rep 10-7
Rhode Island	D+8	Dem	Dem	Dem	Dem 2–0	Dem	Dem	Dem	Dem	Dem 2–0
South Carolina	R+8	Rep	Rep	Rep	Rep 6–1	Rep	Rep	Rep	Rep	Rep 6–1
South Dakota	R+16	Rep	Rep	Rep	Rep 1–0	Rep	Rep	Rep	Rep	Rep 1–0
Tennessee	R+14	Rep	Rep	Rep	Rep 8–1	Rep	Rep	Rep	Rep	Rep 8–1
Texas	R+5	Rep	Rep	Rep	Rep 25–13	Rep	Rep	Rep	Rep	Rep 25–13
Utah	R+13	Rep	Rep	Rep	Rep 4–0	Rep	Rep	Rep	Rep	Rep 4–0
Vermont	D+16	Rep	Dem	Split D/I (Note: One of Vermont's senators, Peter Welch, is a Democrat. The other senator from Vermont, Bernie Sanders, was elected as an independent and has caucused with Democrats since taking office in 2007.)	Dem 1–0	Dem	Rep	Dem	Split D/I	Dem 1–0
Virginia	D+3	Rep	Dem	Dem	Dem 6–5	Dem	Rep	Dem	Dem	Dem 6–5
Washington	D+8	Dem	Dem	Dem	Dem 8–2	Dem	Dem	Dem	Dem	Dem 8–2
West Virginia	R+22	Rep	Rep	Split R/I (Note: One of West Virginia's senators, Shelley Moore Capito, is a Republican. The other senator from West Virginia, Joe Manchin, was elected as a Democrat but registered as an Independent in May 2024.)	Rep 2–0	Rep	Rep	Rep	Rep	Rep 2–0
Wisconsin	R+2	Dem	Rep	Split	Rep 6–2	Rep	Dem	Rep	Split	Rep 6–2
Wyoming	R+25	Rep	Rep	Rep	Rep 1–0	Rep	Rep	Rep	Rep	Rep 1–0
United States	Even	Rep	Rep	Dem	Rep	Rep	Rep	Rep	Rep	Rep
Washington, D.C.	D+43	Dem (Note: The federal district does not have a governor or state legislature but elects the mayor of Washington, D.C., as well as the Council of the District of Columbia.)	Dem	—N/a	Dem	Dem	Dem	Dem	—N/a	Dem
American Samoa	—N/a	NP/D (Note: Although elections for governor of American Samoa are non-partisan, Governor Lemanu Peleti Mauga affiliates with the Democratic Party.)	NP	—N/a	Rep	—N/a	NP/R (Note: Although elections for governor of American Samoa are non-partisan, Governor-elect Pula Nikolao Pula affiliates with the Republican Party.)	NP	—N/a	Rep
Guam	—N/a	Dem	Dem	—N/a	Rep	Dem (Note: Although Guam does not have a vote in the Electoral College, the territory has held a presidential advisory vote for every presidential election since 1980, and continued this tradition in 2024.)	Dem	Rep	—N/a	Rep
N. Mariana Islands	—N/a	Ind	Coalition (Note: A coalition of independents and Democrats control the Northern Mariana Islands House of Representatives and Senate.)	—N/a	Dem	—N/a	Rep (Note: Palacios switched his party affiliation from Independent to the Republican Party in December 2024, while in office.)	Coalition	—N/a	Rep
Puerto Rico	—N/a	PNP/D (Note: Puerto Rican Governor Pedro Pierluisi is a member of the Puerto Rican New Progressive Party, but affiliates with the Democratic Party at the national level.)	PDP	—N/a	PNP/R (Note: Puerto Rico's Jenniffer González is a member of the New Progressive Party, but affiliates with the Republican Party at the national level.)	Dem (Note: Although Puerto Rico does not have a vote in the Electoral College, the territory held a presidential advisory vote in 2024.)	PNP/R	PNP	—N/a	PDP/D (Note: Puerto Rico's Pablo Hernández Rivera is a member of the Popular Democratic Party, but affiliates with the Democratic Party at the national level.)
U.S. Virgin Islands	—N/a	Dem	Dem	—N/a	Dem	—N/a	Dem	Dem	—N/a	Dem
State/Territory	PVI	Governor	State leg.	U.S. Senate	U.S. House	Pres.	Governor	State leg.	U.S. Senate	U.S. House
State/Territory	PVI	Before 2024 elections				After 2024 elections				

== Political violence ==
=== Assassination attempts on Trump ===
On July 13, 2024, during an outdoor campaign rally in Butler, Pennsylvania, Donald Trump was shot in a failed assassination attempt. Trump was shot in the upper right ear, while one rally attendee was killed and two others were critically injured. This marked the first time a current or former US president had been shot since then-President Ronald Reagan was shot on March 30, 1981, the first time a presidential candidate was shot on the campaign trail since the shooting of Democratic presidential candidate George Wallace on May 15, 1972, and the first time a former president had been shot since the shooting of President Theodore Roosevelt on October 14, 1912 (who, similar to Donald Trump, was a former Republican president running for a non-consecutive term when he was shot, though Theodore Roosevelt was seeking a non-consecutive 3rd term as a 3rd party candidate after previously choosing not to run as a Republican in the 1908 election cycle).

On September 15, 2024, Trump's security detail spotted an armed man while the former president was touring his golf course in West Palm Beach, Florida. They opened fire on the suspect, who fled in a vehicle and was later captured thanks to the contribution of an eyewitness. In the location where the suspect was spotted, the police retrieved a modified SKS rifle with a scope, two rucksacks and a GoPro in what was called by the FBI a second assassination attempt.

=== Other ===
The 2024 election cycle had been marked by widespread doxxing, swatting, and threats against several politicians and activists, with a particular series of incidents starting in December 2023.

On November 4, 2024, a white supremacist was arrested for plotting an attack on an electrical substation in Nashville, Tennessee. On November 5, a man was arrested at the U.S. Capitol under suspicion of an attempted arson attack.

== Foreign interference ==
Several foreign nations reportedly interfered in the 2024 United States elections, including China, Iran, and Russia. The efforts largely focused on propaganda and disinformation campaigns using inauthentic accounts on social media, stoking domestic divisions, and denigrating the United States and democracy more broadly.

In response to the surge of misinformation, U.S. authorities imposed sanctions on entities linked to foreign disinformation campaigns. The U.S. Treasury Department sanctioned the Moscow-based Center for Geopolitical Expertise, accusing it of creating and disseminating AI-generated deepfake videos to manipulate American voters.

== See also ==
- Artificial intelligence and elections
- List of elections in the United States
- List of elections in 2024
