= Edward Red Eagle =

Personal details
- Born: Pawhuska, Oklahoma, U.S.
- Died: May 2, 1999
- Children: John Red Eagle
- Parent: Paul Red Eagle (father)

Edward Red Eagle (died May 2, 1999) was an Osage Nation assistant chief for three terms and council member for over forty years. He was born in Pawhuska, Oklahoma, and attended Pawhuska High School. He attended Wichita Business College before joining the U.S. Army for World War II in the Philippines and Japan. His father, Paul Red Eagle, and son, John Red Eagle, also served in the Osage government.
