= James Roan Gray =

Osage politician (1961–2026)

Principal Chief of the Osage Nation
- In office 2002–2010
- Preceded by: Charles O. Tillman
- Succeeded by: John Red Eagle

Personal details
- Born: June 11, 1961 Pawhuska, Oklahoma, U.S.
- Died: February 12, 2026 (aged 64)
- Citizenship: American; Osage Nation
- Relatives: Henry Roan (great-grandfather)
- Education: Northeastern State University

James Roan Gray (June 11, 1961 – February 12, 2026) was an Osage politician who served as the principal chief of the Osage Nation from 2002 to 2010.

== Early life, education, and family ==
James Roan Gray was born in Pawhuska, Oklahoma, on June 11, 1961, to Andrew "Buddy" Gray and Margaret Luttrell Gray. His great-grandfather was Henry Roan. He was raised in Arvada, Colorado, and Pawhuska, where he attended school. He graduated from Pawhuska High School and Northeastern State University. He worked as a journalist and co-owned the Native American Times.

== Principal chief ==
Gray served two consecutive terms as the principal chief of the Osage Nation from 2002 to 2010. During his tenure, the nation adopted new constitution which included three branches of government and voting rights for all Osage citizens. In 2008, he supported the passage of the nation's free press law.

== Death ==
He died on February 12, 2026.
