= Charles Tillman (disambiguation) =

Charles Tillman (born 1981) is an American football player and FBI special agent.

Charles Tillman may also refer to:

- Charles Davis Tillman (1861, Tallassee, Alabama – September 2, 1943), pioneer of southern gospel music
- Charles Tillman (Mississippi politician) (born 1932/1933), mayor of Jackson, Mississippi
- Charles O. Tillman, Osage politician
