= Geoffrey Standing Bear =

American lawyer

Geoffrey M. Standing Bear
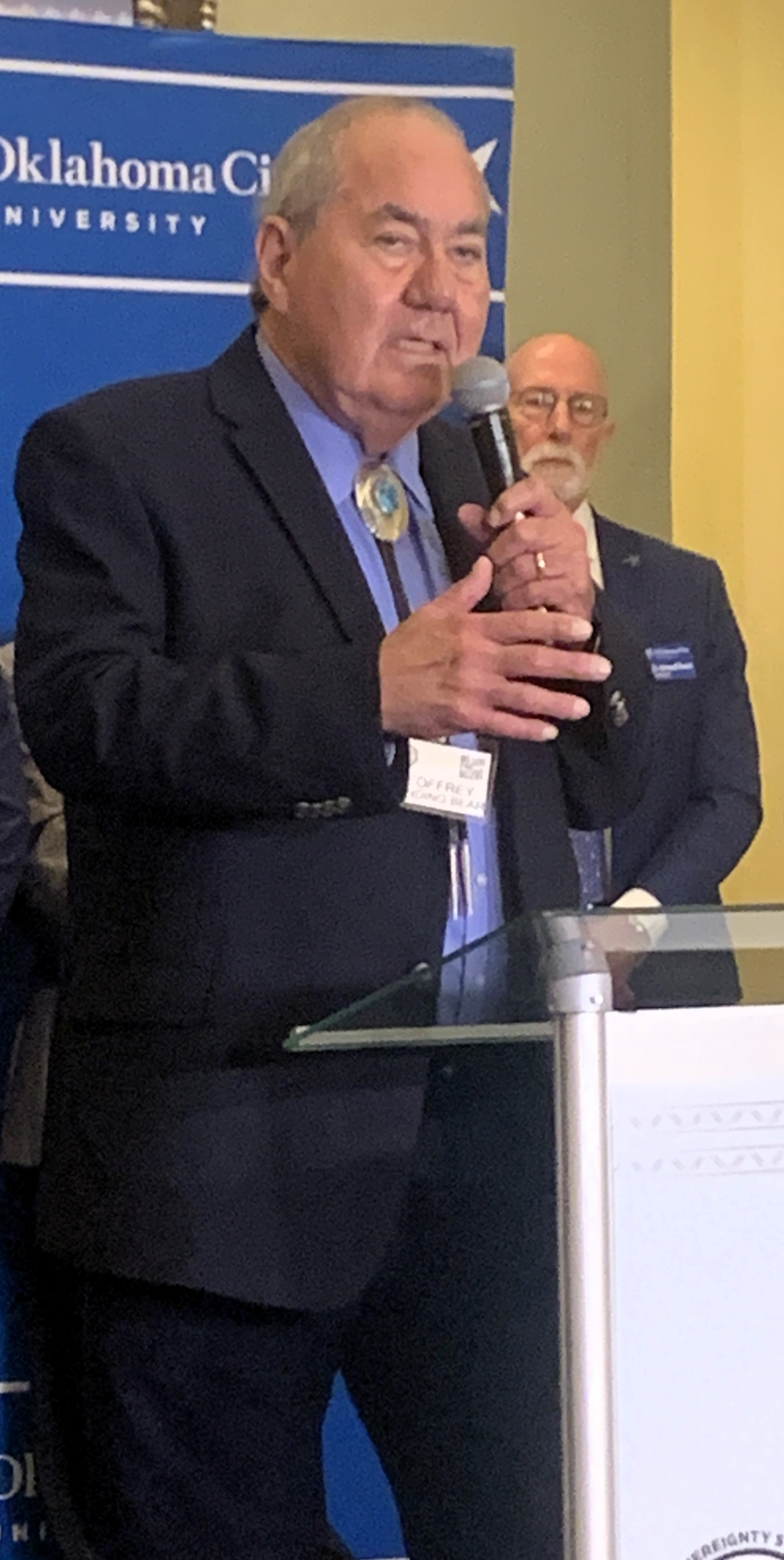
- Standing Bear in 2024

Member of the Osage Nation Mineral Council
- Incumbent
- Assumed office July 1, 2026

Principal Chief of Osage Nation
- In office 2 July 2014 – 30 June 2026
- Preceded by: Scott Bighorse
- Succeeded by: Joe Tillman

Personal details
- Party: Republican
- Relatives: Fred Lookout (great-grandfather)
- Education: University of Tulsa, J.D.
- Profession: Attorney

Geoffrey M. Standing Bear (Osage) is an attorney and politician who served as Principal Chief of the Osage Nation from 2014 through 2026.

== Early life and education ==
Chief Standing Bear was born into the Osage Nation in Oklahoma. He attended Bishop Kelley High School in Tulsa, Oklahoma and the University of Tulsa College of Law. He is the great-grandson of Fred Lookout.

== Political career ==
Over the years Standing Bear became active in tribal politics as the people took more actions to assert their sovereignty. He was elected as Principal Chief of the Osage Nation and took office on July 2, 2014, after the previous chief, John Red Eagle, was impeached. Standing Bear succeeded Scott Bighorse, who had served as acting chief.

Chief Standing Bear took office after the Osage received a landmark settlement from the federal government to settle claims of mismanagement of revenues due tribal members from leased mineral rights. Under his administration, the Osage Nation worked to increase their communal landholdings, acquiring more than 50,000 acres (20,000 ha) of mostly former reservation land. This total includes the tribe's purchase from Ted Turner of the 43,000-acre (17,000 ha) Bluestem Ranch, located in historically Osage territory.

The tribe has also developed a $160 million casino in Tulsa, Oklahoma, new educational and language preservation initiatives, and two community centers. The tribe has challenged the Oklahoma Attorney General's office with regard to tribal sovereignty and water/mineral rights.

Chief Standing Bear worked extensively with Martin Scorsese and his production team to create opportunities for Osage and to promote their culture in the filming and production of Killers of the Flower Moon (2023). Not only were numerous Osage hired as actors and extras, but others were employed as technical staff behind the cameras, and were involved in research and creation of historically accurate costumes and sets.

Standing Bear attended the 2024 Republican National Convention in Milwaukee, speaking at a roundtable hosted by Cherokee U.S. Senator Markwayne Mullin (R-OK) and advocating for tribal development of business assets. He also took aim at the U.S. Department of the Interior under Deb Haaland, saying "under their control, the Department of Interior, we’re down to 10,000 barrels a day. And so last year, last April [2023], we filed our protest against new regulations that were imposed upon us." He expressed hope for a future Second Trump Administration: "I just hope this new administration will join us and make permanent changes. So we really are going to be self-sufficient. We really are going to talk about self-governance. That’s what we got to do."

Following his last term as Principal Chief, Standing Bear was elected to the Osage Minerals Council on July 1, 2026.
