= Joe Sweeden =

American politician

Member of the Oklahoma Senate from the 10th district
- In office 2006–2010
- Preceded by: J. Berry Harrison
- Succeeded by: Eddie Fields

Member of the Oklahoma House of Representatives from the 36th district
- In office 1999–2006
- Preceded by: James Hager
- Succeeded by: Scott Bighorse

Personal details
- Born: Pawhuska, Oklahoma
- Party: Democratic
- Spouse: Sheila
- Education: Oklahoma State University, Northern Oklahoma College
- Occupation: Rancher

Joe Loyd Sweeden (born April 7, 1961) is an American politician. He served as a member of the Oklahoma Senate representing District 10, which includes Kay, Osage, Pawnee and Payne counties, from 2006 to 2010. He previously served in the Oklahoma House of Representatives from 1999 through 2006. He was born in Pawhuska, Oklahoma.

During his tenure in the Oklahoma State Senate, Sweeden served on several committees, including the General Government and Transportation Appropriations Subcommittee. He was unable to seek re-election in 2010 due to term limits.

After leaving the Oklahoma Senate, Sweeden remained active in community organizations. As of 2024, he serves as the marketing director for the Cavalcade Rodeo, where the organization states that he has volunteered for more than 50 years.
