= J. Berry Harrison =

American politician (1939–2020)

Member of the Oklahoma Senate from the 10th district
- In office November 1990 – November 2006
- Preceded by: John Dahl
- Succeeded by: Joe Sweeden

Personal details
- Born: J Berry Harrison; January 10, 1939 Fairfax, Oklahoma, U.S.
- Died: October 21, 2020 (aged 81) Tulsa, Oklahoma, U.S.
- Party: Democratic Party
- Education: Northeastern State University

J. Berry Harrison (January 10, 1939 - October 21, 2020) was an American politician who served in the Oklahoma Senate representing the 10th district from 1990 to 2006.

== Early life and education ==
J Berry Harrison was born on January 10, 1939, to J. D. "Jake" and Virginia Berry Harrison in Fairfax, Oklahoma. He graduated from Fairfax Public Schools in 1957, before attending Oklahoma State University where he played on the 1958 Oklahoma State Cowboys football team. He later transferred to Northeastern State University where he graduated with a bachelor’s degree in business administration. He married in 1961, had two children, and started ranching in Osage County.

== Oklahoma Senate and death ==
Harrison served in the Oklahoma Senate as a member of the Democratic Party representing the 10th district from 1990 to 2006. He was preceded in office by John Dahl and succeeded in office by Joe Sweeden. He died on October 21, 2020, in Tulsa from complications following a stroke.
