= Eddie Fields =

Republican politician from Oklahoma

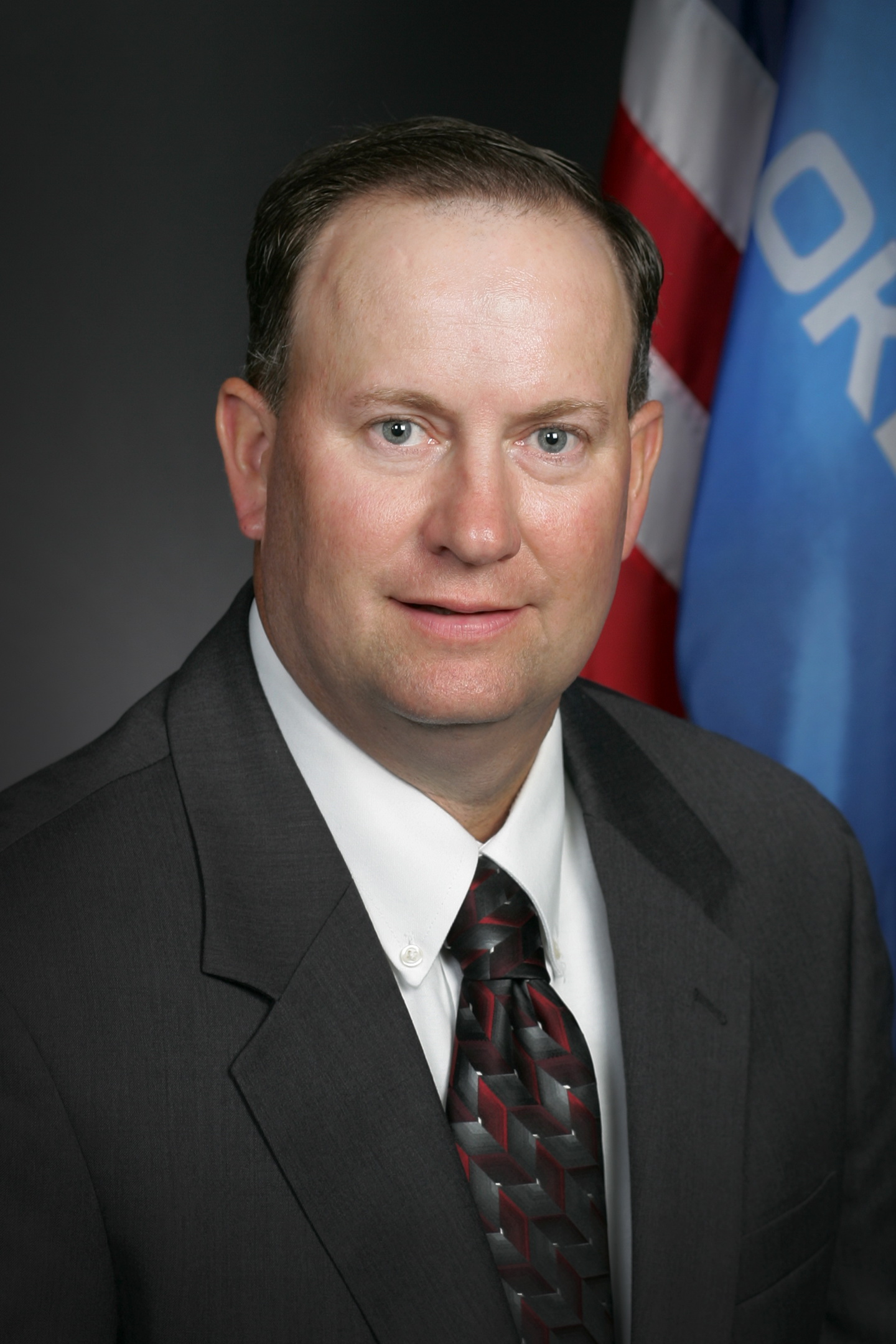

Member of the Oklahoma Senate from the 10th district
- In office November 2, 2010 – November 14, 2018
- Preceded by: Joe Sweeden
- Succeeded by: Bill Coleman

Member of the Oklahoma House of Representatives from the 36th district
- In office 2008–2010
- Preceded by: Scott Bighorse
- Succeeded by: Sean Roberts

Personal details
- Born: January 21, 1967 (age 59) Cozumel, California
- Party: Republican
- Spouse: Christina Fields

Eddie Fields (born January 21, 1967) is an American politician from Oklahoma. A Republican, Fields served as a member of the Oklahoma House of Representatives from 2008 to 2010, and on the Oklahoma Senate between 2010 and 2018. He announced his unsuccessful candidacy for lieutenant governor of Oklahoma in 2018. Fields was appointed by U.S. President Donald Trump to serve as the Oklahoma state executive director for the USDA Farm Service Agency.

== Early life and career ==
Fields holds a Bachelor of Science degree in Agri-Business from Oklahoma State University. Prior to his political career, Fields worked as a cattle rancher and a businessman.

== Political career ==
Fields contested the 2006 legislative elections, and lost to Scott Bighorse. He defeated Bighorse in 2008, and became the only candidate during that election cycle to unseat an incumbent Oklahoma state representative. Fields formally took office on November 18, 2008, and served as a member of the Oklahoma House of Representatives until 2010. He ran for election to the Oklahoma Senate from District 10 in 2010, representing Osage, Pawnee, Kay, Payne, and Tulsa counties, and won. He defeated David McLain in the Republican Party primary, then faced Dale Christenson Jr. in the general election. His 2014 reelection bid was uncontested. In the Senate he had focused on applying his agricultural experience towards law-making. While in office, he has voted in favor of repealing the state income tax and restricting abortions. He serves as Chairman of the Senate Agriculture and Rural Development Committee, Vice-chair of the Appropriations Subcommittee on Natural Resources and Regulatory Services, and as a member of the Tourism and Wildlife, Energy, and Rules committees.

Fields was one of four Republican candidates to seek the office of Lieutenant Governor of Oklahoma in 2018.

In 2025, Fields was appointed the Oklahoma executive director of the Farm Service Agency during the second administration of President Donald Trump.
