= Scott Bighorse =

American politician

- Kiheka

Member of the Osage Nation Congress
- In office July 2018 – July 11, 2026

Principal Chief of the Osage Nation
- In office 21 January 2014 – 2 July 2014
- Preceded by: John Red Eagle
- Succeeded by: Geoffrey Standing Bear

Assistant Principal Chief of the Osage Nation
- In office 4 August 2010 – 21 January 2014
- Preceded by: John Red Eagle
- Succeeded by: Terry Mason Moore

Member of the Oklahoma House of Representatives from the 36th district
- In office 2006–2008
- Preceded by: Joe Sweeden
- Succeeded by: Eddie Fields

Personal details
- Born: July 16, 1956 (age 70)
- Party: Democratic

Scott Norris Bighorse (born c. 1956) is an Osage American politician. Between 2006 and 2008, Bighorse was a member of the Oklahoma House of Representatives from the 36th district. From 2010 to 2014, he served as assistant principal chief of the Osage Nation. Bighorse was elevated to interim principal chief of the Osage Nation after the 2014 impeachment of John Red Eagle and replaced later that year by Geoffrey Standing Bear. Bighorse was elected to the Osage Nation Congress in 2018 and served until 2026.

== Early life and career ==
In the Osage language, Bighorse is known as Kiheka, translated to English as Big Chief. Prior to his first campaign for public office, Bighorse worked for the Oklahoma state government for 24 years as a correctional officer and juvenile detention consultant. As a child, he had been inspired to participate in county and tribal politics by members of his family. Outside of his political activity and public service, Bighorse became known as a traditional singer.

== Oklahoma House of Representatives ==
Bighorse's first state legislative campaign was backed by the Indigenous Democratic Network. In March 2006, he was the only Democratic Party candidate for the 36th district seat of the Oklahoma House of Representatives. After Jack Rankin entered the race, Bighorse defeated him in a party primary election four months later. Bighorse subsequently faced Eddie Fields and won election to the Oklahoma House of Representatives in the November 2006 general election. In March 2007, he was named to the Native American Caucus of the Oklahoma Legislature, serving as spiritual counselor and as a member of the caucus's advisory team. Bighorse ran for reelection in 2008, this time losing to Fields. Bighorse was the only incumbent state representative in Oklahoma to lose during the 2008 election cycle.

== Osage Nation political career ==
Following his single term as a state representative, Bighorse began campaigning for the 2010 Osage Nation tribal election in August 2009. The first round of the election was held on 7 June 2010. In a runoff election on 19 July 2010, he was elected assistant principal chief, and formally assumed the office on 4 August 2010, alongside principal chief John Red Eagle, who preceded him as assistant principal chief. Following Red Eagle's impeachment and removal from office in January 2014, Bighorse became principal chief. Bighorse completed Red Eagle's term, choosing not to run for the office in his own right. Soon after becoming principal chief, Bighorse named Terry Mason Moore assistant principal chief. Bighorse served as principal chief until Geoffrey Standing Bear assumed the role on 2 July 2014. Bighorse took office as a member of the Osage Nation Congress in July 2018. He was reelected in 2022. Bighorse ran in the 2026 principal chief election. He finished second in the primary and runoff elections. After Joe Tillman was elected principal chief, Bighorse retired from the Osage Nation Congress.
