= Nelagoney, Oklahoma =

- Census-designated place
- Location within Oklahoma Location within the United States
- Coordinates: 36°37′35″N 96°14′39″W
- Country: United States
- State: Oklahoma
- County: Osage

Area
  - Total: 0.40 sq mi (1.04 km^{2})
  - Land: 0.40 sq mi (1.04 km^{2})
  - Water: 0 sq mi (0.00 km^{2})
- Elevation: 837 ft (255 m)

Population (2020)
  - Total: 71
  - Density: 177.3/sq mi (68.44/km^{2})
- Time zone: UTC-6 (Central (CST))
  - Summer (DST): UTC-5 (CDT)
- ZIP Code: 74056 (Pawhuska)
- Area codes: 918/539
- FIPS code: 40-50800
- GNIS feature ID: 2812864

Nelagoney is an unincorporated community and census-designated place (CDP) in Osage County, Oklahoma, United States. It was first listed as a CDP prior to the 2020 census. As of the 2020 census, Nelagoney had a population of 71.

The CDP is in eastern Osage County, on a hill overlooking Bird Creek to the north. The west border of the CDP follows Saucy Calf Creek, a north-flowing tributary of Bird Creek, which flows southeast to the Verdigris River northeast of Tulsa.

Nelagoney is 6 miles (10 km) southeast of Pawhuska, the Osage county seat, 22 miles (35 km) southwest of Bartlesville, and 45 miles (72 km) north-northwest of Tulsa.

== Demographics ==
Historical population
Census	Pop.	Note	%±
2020	71		—
U.S. Decennial Census

=== 2020 census ===
As of the 2020 census, Nelagoney had a population of 71. The median age was 49.9 years. 22.5% of residents were under the age of 18 and 16.9% of residents were 65 years of age or older. For every 100 females there were 65.1 males, and for every 100 females age 18 and over there were 48.6 males age 18 and over.

0.0% of residents lived in urban areas, while 100.0% lived in rural areas.

There were 21 households in Nelagoney, of which 28.6% had children under the age of 18 living in them. Of all households, 47.6% were married-couple households, 4.8% were households with a male householder and no spouse or partner present, and 38.1% were households with a female householder and no spouse or partner present. About 28.6% of all households were made up of individuals and 19.0% had someone living alone who was 65 years of age or older.

There were 30 housing units, of which 30.0% were vacant. The homeowner vacancy rate was 0.0% and the rental vacancy rate was 25.0%.

Racial composition as of the 2020 census
Race	Number	Percent
White	29	40.8%
Black or African American	0	0.0%
American Indian and Alaska Native	28	39.4%
Asian	0	0.0%
Native Hawaiian and Other Pacific Islander	0	0.0%
Some other race	0	0.0%
Two or more races	14	19.7%
Hispanic or Latino (of any race)	1	1.4%

== Education ==
Nelagoney is zoned to Pawhuska Public Schools.
