= RJ Walker =

US Osage Nation politician

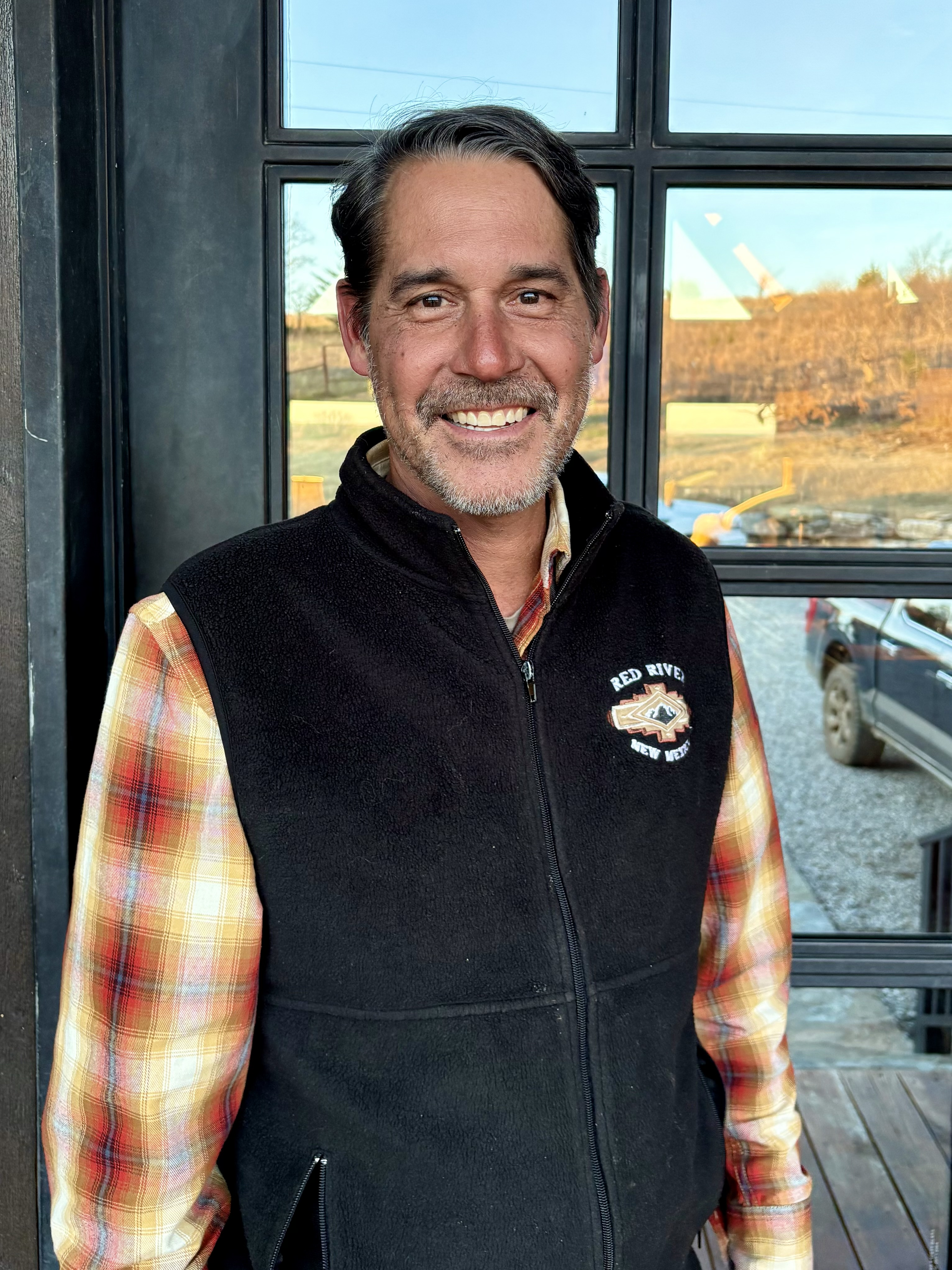

Osage Nation Congressmen
- Incumbent
- Assumed office July 11, 2026
- In office 2012 – June 2022

Assistant Principal Chief of the Osage Nation
- In office June 2022 – July 11, 2026
- Preceded by: Raymond W. RedCorn III
- Succeeded by: John Shaw

Personal details
- Born: Robert James Walker Jr. September 11, 1972 (age 53) Pawhuska, Oklahoma, U.S.
- Citizenship: American; Osage Nation
- Party: Republican
- Education: University of Central Oklahoma

Robert James Walker Jr. is an Osage politician who has served as a member of the Osage Nation Congress since 2026. He previously served as Assistant Principal Chief of the Osage Nation from June 2022 to June 2026.

== Early life and education ==
RJ Walker was born on September 11, 1972 at Claremore Indian Hospital in Claremore, Oklahoma. He graduated from Pawhuska High School in 1990 and later went on to attend University of Central Oklahoma in Edmond, Oklahoma.

== Political career ==
In 2002, Walker was hired by the 31st Tribal Council to manage the Transportation Improvement Program currently known as the Roads Department. As Director of the Roads Department, he effectively led the department as it moved toward establishing its own self-governance. Ten years later, Walker was elected to the 3rd Osage Nation Congress in 2012.

Over the course of his time as a member of Congress, Walker was a strong advocate for infrastructure development, partnerships with local governments, land buy-back efforts, emergency services, self-governance, language and cultural initiatives, employee rights and protections, child care, and taxation opportunities on Osage lands. Throughout this period he served on the Osage County Industrial Authority Board and Pawhuska Business Development Center Incubator Board.

Walker served as the 6th Osage Nation Congressional Speaker in 2016 and 2017. Five years later, Walker won the 2022 election for Assistant Principal Chief with 1,659 votes in his favor in comparison to his competitor, Tom Trumbly, who received 687 votes.

Walker ran for the Osage Nation Congress in 2026 and won a seat in the June election.

== Personal ==
Walker currently resides in Pawhuska, Oklahoma with his wife. He has three daughters, two sons, and two grandchildren. Walker served as Assistant Principal Chief exactly one-hundred years after his great-great grandfather, Louis Bighorse, had between 1920-1922. He and his family annually participate in In-Lon-Schka as members of the Eagle Clan. Walker enjoys golfing in his free time, and in 2015 won the inaugural city golf championship at Pawhuska Golf & Country Club.
