= Joe Tillman =

Principal Chief of the Osage Nation since 2026

Principal Chief of the Osage Nation
- Incumbent
- Assumed office July 11, 2026
- Preceded by: Geoffrey Standing Bear

Member of the Osage Nation Congress
- In office 2016–2026

Personal details
- Born: Fairfax, Oklahoma, U.S.
- Citizenship: American; Osage Nation
- Parent: Charles O. Tillman (father)
- Education: Oklahoma State University

Joe Tillman is an Osage politician who has served as the Principal Chief of the Osage Nation since 2026.

== Early life, education, and family ==
Joe Tillman was born and raised in Fairfax, Oklahoma, where he graduated high school before attending Oklahoma State University where he earned both a bachelor's and master's degree. He was a member of the Oklahoma State Cowboys football team from 1978 to 1981. He is the son of former Principal Chief of the Osage Nation Charles O. Tillman.

He worked for Bucknell University from 1999 to 2001, and for Fiducial/Core Business Solutions before working for the Osage Nation government in the administration of John Red Eagle.

== Osage politics ==
He was elected to the Osage Nation Congress in 2016. He was reelected in 2020 and 2024.

In 2026, he ran for Principal Chief of the Osage Nation and placed first in the primary election, advancing to a runoff election alongside Scott Bighorse. Amanda GoodEagle placed third and was eliminated. He won the general election and was inaugurated principal chief succeeding Geoffrey Standing Bear.
