= George Tall Chief =

American educator, tribal chief (1916–2013)

Chief of the Osage Nation
- In office 1982–1990
- Preceded by: Sylvester Tinker
- Succeeded by: Charles O. Tillman

Personal details
- Born: November 21, 1916 Arkansas City, Kansas
- Died: August 11, 2013 (age 96) Fairfax, Oklahoma

George Eves Tall Chief (November 21, 1916 – August 11, 2013) was an American educator. He served as a chief in the Osage Nation.

Born in Arkansas City, Kansas, Tall Chief received his bachelor's degree from University of Central Oklahoma and his masters from Pacific University. Tall Chief taught history, nutrition and physical education in Oregon, Idaho, and Oklahoma. He also coached wrestling, football, and baseball. He was also a scout for the Baltimore Colts and liaison representative between Pacific University and the Dallas Cowboys. He served as chief of the Osage Nation 1982–1990. He then served as the president of the first Osage National Council. He died in Fairfax, Oklahoma.
