= Charles O. Tillman =

Principal Chief of the Osage Nation
- In office 1990–2002
- Preceded by: George Tall Chief
- Succeeded by: James Roan Gray

Member of the Osage Nation Tribal Council
- In office 1978–1982

Personal details
- Born: Charles Owen Tillman Jr. September 22, 1937 Ponca City, Oklahoma, U.S.
- Died: February 1, 2022 (aged 84)
- Citizenship: American; Osage Nation
- Children: Joe Tillman

Charles O. Tillman was an Osage politician who served as the Principal Chief of the Osage Nation from 1990 to 2002. He previously served on the Osage Tribal Council from 1978 to 1982.

== Biography ==
Charles Owen Tillman Jr. was born on September 22, 1937, to Charles Owen Tillman Sr. and Josephine Goode in Ponca City, Oklahoma. He graduated from Fairfax High School and attended the University of Oklahoma before serving in the United States Army. Tillman was elected to the Osage Tribal Council in 1978 and served until 1982. He was later elected Principal Chief of the Osage Nation from 1990 to 2002.

He died on February 1, 2022. His son, Joe Tillman, is also an Osage politician.
