= Native American Times =

Newspaper in Tahlequah, Oklahoma (began 2009)

Native Times
- Type: Weekly newspaper
- Format: Digital-only
- Owner: Lisa Hicks Snell
- Founded: 1994
- Headquarters: Tahlequah, Oklahoma
- Website: nativetimes.com

The Native American Times was a statewide newspaper Tahlequah, Oklahoma which began print circulation in December 2009. As Native Times it continues to publish original articles online as well as other articles from competitors and reputable news agencies.

A singular voice for the 585 "Federally Recognized" and various other Indian Tribes across North America, the Times was systemically downsized due to loss of print ad revenue.

Nativetimes.com, archives back issues in PDF format for free and was operated by Lisa Snell, a member of the Cherokee Nation, who served as the Publisher for the paper. Snell, citing a lack of advertising revenue discontinued print in April 2014, but maintained its website. Native American Times went up for sale in early 2017.

Writer and journalist, Andrea Lynette Long takes over the post as Editor in Chief of the Native American Times after only a few months contributing at-large from New York City and Dallas, Texas. Long, 39, is a 2001 graduate from the University of Oklahoma and holds a Bachelor of Arts Degree in Psychology. She is the only product of the union of Donald E. Long and Aida Ester Johnson (Mora-Sequeria) is a third generation graduate from the once prestigious and world-renowned Yuchi Mission Indian Boarding School where her grandfather M.L. Long and Barbara Riederer attended in the early 1950s.

Long also edits the Native Oklahoma Magazine and contributes to a New York-based News Agency, Caracal Reports. Long plans to have the Times back in print and circulation by June 2019.

In 2019, Long plans to print and distribute the paper nationwide by creating an Indian Associated Press outlet allowing all agencies to report their local news without having to run independent media companies, allowing for a master glossary of data and facts for all Tribes. Talks began in late October in conjunction with the Bureau of Indian Affairs after the Secretary of the Interior, Ryan Zinke announced the BIA would be re-organized after over 100 years as a Federal Partner Agency. The Secretary of the Interior plans to close regional offices across the country in efforts to cut costs but the clean up will not aid the on-going tribal fraud occurring in the casino gaming industry. Hundreds of tribal citizens at forums have voiced outrage after reminding the Bureau of the over 100 year history of the Federal Government's inability and unwillingness to adhere to its very proposed treaties. The Times for now, will remain a free newsletter while transitioning to a full format print newspaper, and will remain free online. Online and print subscriptions are slated for early 2019.
