= Crowe & Dunlevy =

American law firm

- Headquarters: Oklahoma City
- No. of offices: 4
- No. of attorneys: 130
- Major practice areas: Business Law, Oil and Natural Gas, and Litigation
- Key people: Adam W. Childers, President and CEO
- Date founded: 1902
- Company type: Professional Corporation
- Website: www.crowedunlevy.com

Crowe & Dunlevy is an American law firm headquartered in Oklahoma. Founded in 1902, it is the second largest law firm in Oklahoma with offices in Oklahoma City, Tulsa, Dallas, and Houston, and is Oklahoma's second oldest law firm. According to the annual Law360 400 Report, a ranking of the 400 largest U.S. law firms by number of lawyers, in 2021 Crowe & Dunlevy was listed as the 351st largest law firm in the country. In 2019, Forbes Media named Crowe & Dunlevy to its inaugural list of America's Top Law Firms, the only Oklahoma City-based firm named to the list.

== History ==
=== 1902–1949 ===
The firm was founded in 1902 by Charles Edward Johnson (1870–1950). Johnson was a Swedish emigrant and a University of Texas Law School graduate. The firm's first office was located at 131 ½ West Grand. The Westin Hotel stands at this location today.

In 1903, Albert P. Crockett (1871–1918) joined Johnson's practice, forming the firm's first partnership. Judge Benjamin F. Burwell (1866–1916) joined the firm in 1907 and the name changed to Burwell, Crockett & Johnson. Judge Burwell began practicing law in Oklahoma in 1891. By 1898, he was serving as an Associate Justice of the Supreme Court for the Territory of Oklahoma, a position he held from 1898 until statehood in 1907. Judge Burwell died in 1916 and John Embry (1869–1960), a former U.S. Attorney for the state of Oklahoma, joined the firm. The firm's name changed to Embry, Crockett & Johnson. In 1918, Crockett died and Chester P. Kidd joined the firm. The name of the firm changed to Embry, Johnson & Kidd.

In 1922, Kidd retired due to illness. That same year, Raymond A. Tolbert (1890–1960), joined the firm. The firm's name changed to Embry, Johnson & Tolbert. Tolbert would serve as the firm's managing partner until his death. In 1929, Vincil Penny Crowe (1897–1974), a former assistant attorney general for the State of Oklahoma, joined the firm, and the name became Embry, Johnson, Crowe & Tolbert. The First National Building was completed in 1932, and the firm moved to Suite 640 at the southeast corner of Park and Robinson. The firm's name changed to Embry, Johnson, Crowe, Tolbert & Shelton in 1943 when Troy Shelton became the newest partner.

=== 1950–1980 ===
In 1950, the firm's founder, Charles Edward Johnson, died. By 1951, the firm's name changed again this time to include the new partner, and Embry's son-in-law, Calvin P. Boxley (1901–1966). The firm became known as Embry, Johnson, Crowe, Tolbert & Boxley. Though he died in 1950, Johnson's name remained a part of the firm name until 1953. That year Charles Edward Johnson's name was dropped from the firm name and Bruce H. Johnson's name was added. The two Johnsons were not related and the firm became Embry, Crowe, Tolbert, Boxley & Johnson. In 1959, Vivian Diffendaffer became the first woman attorney to work at Crowe & Dunlevy.

John Embry and Raymond A. Tolbert both died in 1960, and Fred W. Dunlevy (April 19, 1914 – September 13, 1994), C. Harold Thweatt and John W. Swinford all became partners. In 1961, the firm's name became Crowe, Boxley, Dunlevy, Thweatt, Swinford & Johnson. The new partners were not new to the firm; Dunlevy joined the firm in 1937, Thweatt joined in 1944 and Swinford joined in 1946. Calvin P. Boxley died in 1966 and in 1968 the firm's name became Crowe, Dunlevy, Thweatt, Swinford, Johnson & Burdick to include Ben L. Burdick, a new partner who had been with the firm since 1947. Charles ("Chuck") W. Mooney Jr., later the Charles A. Heimbold, Jr. Professor of Law and interim Dean at the University of Pennsylvania Law School, was a partner from 1977 to 1981. In 1979, the moniker 'A Professional Corporation,' was added to the firm's name.

=== 1981–present ===
In 1981, the name of the firm was changed one last time to Crowe & Dunlevy, A Professional Corporation. That same year, the firm moved to the Mid-America Tower (now known as the Continental Oil Center) at the southeast corner of Main and Broadway. The firm's name has remained the same since. To meet the needs of its expanding client base, Crowe & Dunlevy opened the Tulsa office in 1989 and a Norman office in 1991. The Norman office has since closed. In 2007, Crowe & Dunlevy formed the Oklahoma Law Alliance. In 2011, Crowe & Dunlevy merged with another Oklahoma law firm, Day, Edwards, Propester & Christensen. Attorneys from Day, Edwards, Propester & Christensen joined Crowe & Dunlevy, with a focus on securities litigation and banking and financial institutions. In April 2012, Kevin Gordon was elected president of the firm. In September 2014, Crowe & Dunlevy became the anchor tenant of the newly renovated, historic Braniff Building in downtown Oklahoma City. The firm's attorneys and legal staff occupy all ten floors of the building's Class A office space. In 2015, Crowe & Dunlevy celebrated 25 years in its Tulsa office. The firm paid tribute to clients and the community with a donation of $12,500 distributed among 25 different Tulsa nonprofits. In April 2016, the firm named its third female president and CEO, Timila S. Rother. In 2017, the firm opened its first office outside of Oklahoma in Dallas, Texas.

== Executive committee ==
Crowe & Dunlevy's executive committee includes:

1. Adam W. Childers, President and CEO
2. J. Robert Kalsu, Vice President of Economics, Member
3. Cynda C. Ottaway, Chairman of the Board
4. Malcolm E. Rosser, Vice Chairman of the Board
5. Kayci B. Hughes, Member
6. Kari Hoffhines, Member
7. David M. Sullivan, Member

== Areas of practice ==
Crowe & Dunlevy's clients include individuals and small businesses, as well as large national and multi-national corporations. Crowe & Dunlevy has represented clients in all aspects of commercial law practice, in both state and federal courts. The firm's major areas of practice include: administrative and regulatory law; alternative dispute resolution; antitrust; appellate; aviation and commercial space; banking and financial institutions; bankruptcy and creditor's rights; cannabis industry; construction; corporate and securities; criminal defense, compliance, and investigations; employee benefits and ERISA; energy, environment and natural resources; healthcare; Indian law and gaming; initiative petitions; insurance; intellectual property; immigration; international; labor and employment; litigation and trial; nonprofit/charitable foundations; private wealth and closely held business; product liability; real estate; securities litigation, taxation; and wind and renewable energy.

== Networks and alliances ==
=== Lex Mundi ===
Crowe & Dunlevy is the sole member firm in Oklahoma for Lex Mundi, a network of independent law firms in more than 100 countries. The network provides access to more than 21,000 lawyers in the US and abroad. The firm's Lex Mundi contact is William H. Hoch.

=== State Law Resources ===
State Law Resources is a national network of independent law firms, one from each state and two from the District of Columbia, which specialize in handling administrative, regulatory and government relations issues at the state and federal level. The firm's State Law Resources contacts are Libby Scott and Glen Johnson, Jr.

=== Employment Law Alliance ===
Employment Law Alliance is a network of 2000 employment and labor law attorneys from more than 50 countries. The firm's ELA contact is Adam Childers.
