= Paul Red Eagle =

Osage chief

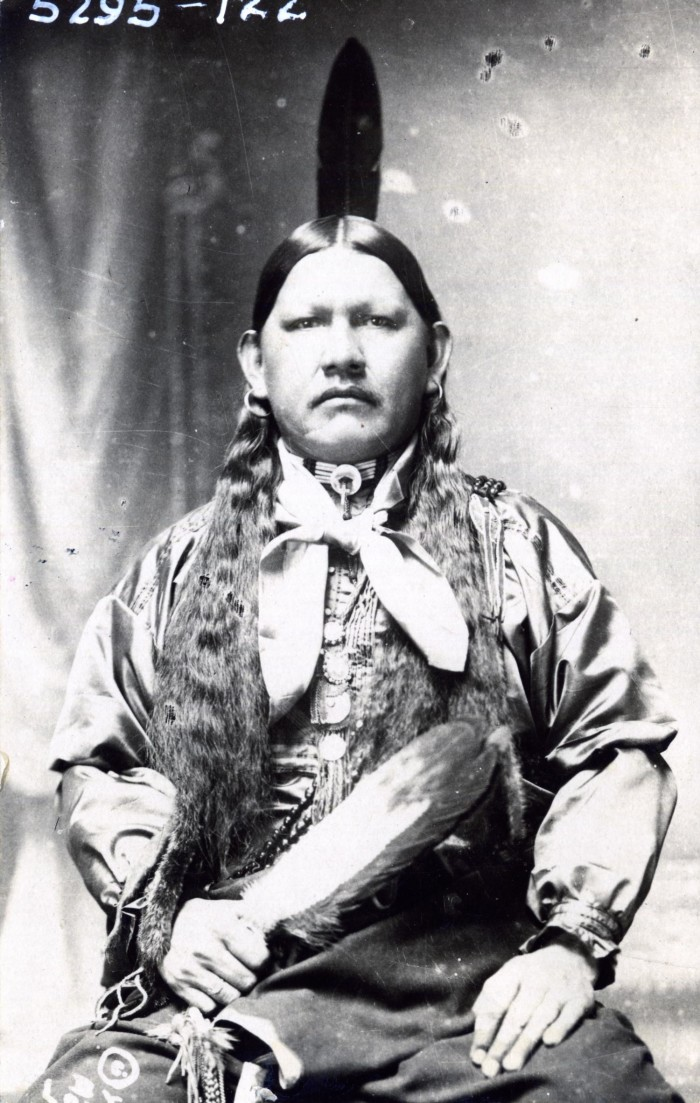
- Red Eagle photographed sometime between 1918 and 1922

Principal chief of the Osage Nation
- In office August 1923 – June 30, 1924
- Preceded by: Ne-kah-wah-she-tun-kah
- Succeeded by: Fred Lookout

Assistant chief of the Osage Nation
- In office 1922 – August 1923
- In office July 1, 1916 – June 30, 1920

Personal details
- Born: c. 1880 Osage Mission's post
- Died: July 1, 1941 (age 60–61)
- Citizenship: Osage Nation
- Children: 5, including Edward
- Relatives: John Red Eagle (grandson)

Paul Red Eagle (c. 1880 – July 1, 1941) was an Osage politician who served as the Principal Chief of the Osage Nation between 1923 and 1924 and as the assistant principal chief between 1916–1920 and 1922–1923.

== Early life and career ==
Paul Red Eagle was born at the Osage Mission's post in Kansas in 1880. He was elected as the assistant chief of the Osage Nation and served from July 1, 1916, to June 30, 1920. In 1922 he was again elected assistant chief, but he became the principal chief in August 1923 following the death of Me-Kah-Wah-She-Tun-Kah. He served until June 30, 1924. He died on July 1, 1941, and was buried near Barnsdall, Oklahoma.

== Personal life ==
Red Eagle had five children: Harry Red Eagle, Johnny Red Eagle, Edward Red Eagle, Mary Big Elk, and Margaret Stabler.

== In media ==
Everett Waller portrays Red Eagle in the 2023 film Killers of the Flower Moon.
