= Rosana Chouteau =

Rosalie Captain Chouteau

First female elected chief of the Osage Beaver Band, of the Osage Nation in Oklahoma, in 1875 leader

Rosalie Captain Chouteau sometimes referred to as Rosana or Rosa, was the first woman to be elected chief of the Osage Beaver Band, a clan of the Native American Osage Nation in Oklahoma, in 1875, following the death of her uncle.

A year after her election, Choteau asserted, "I think my band obey me better than they would a man."

== In popular culture ==
She is featured (with her name incorrectly spelled as Rosa) in Judy Chicago's installation art piece The Dinner Party.

== See also ==
- List of Native American politicians
- Native American women in politics
