= 2024 Scottsdale mayoral election =

Election in Arizona, US

- November 5, 2024
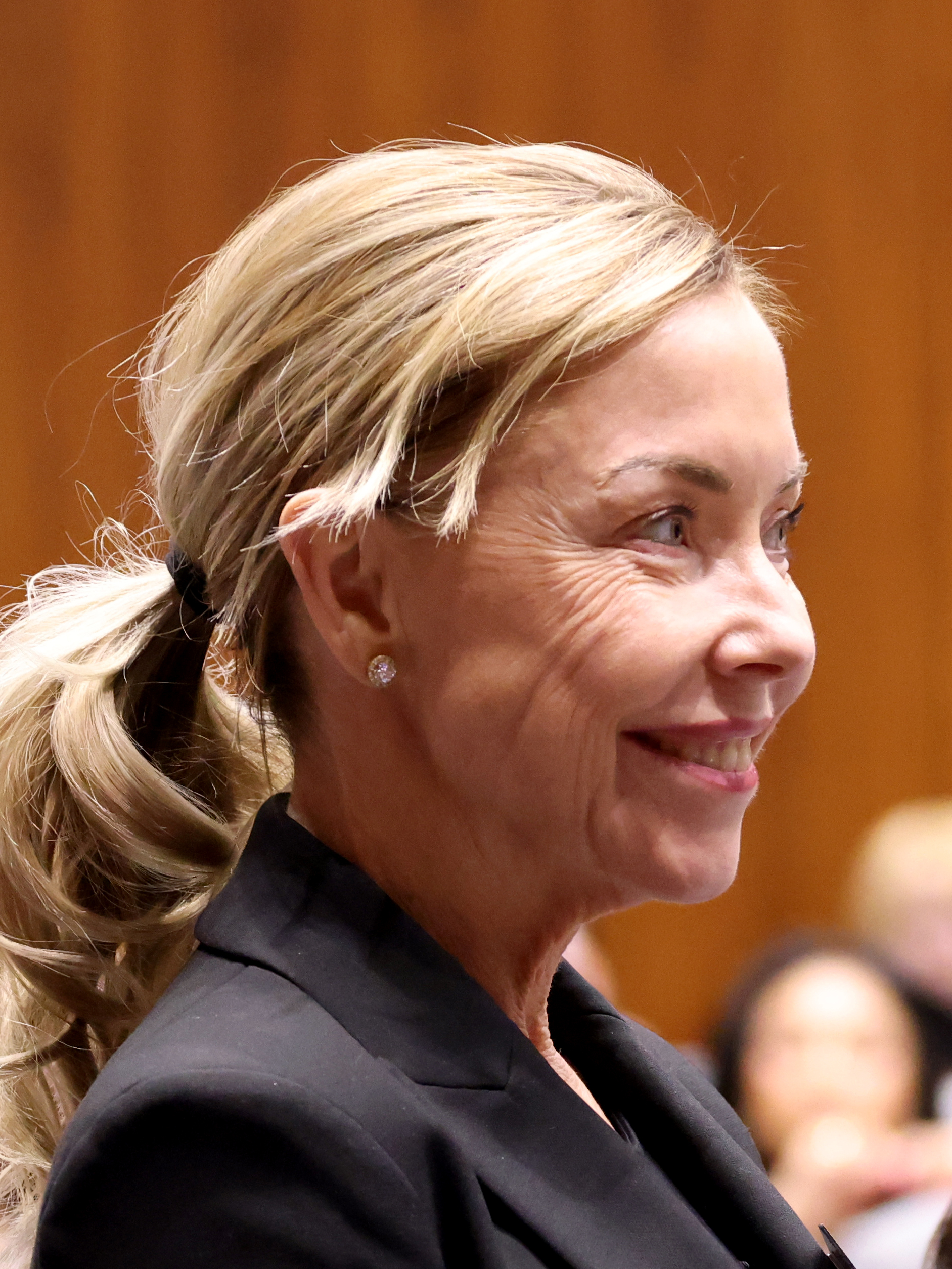

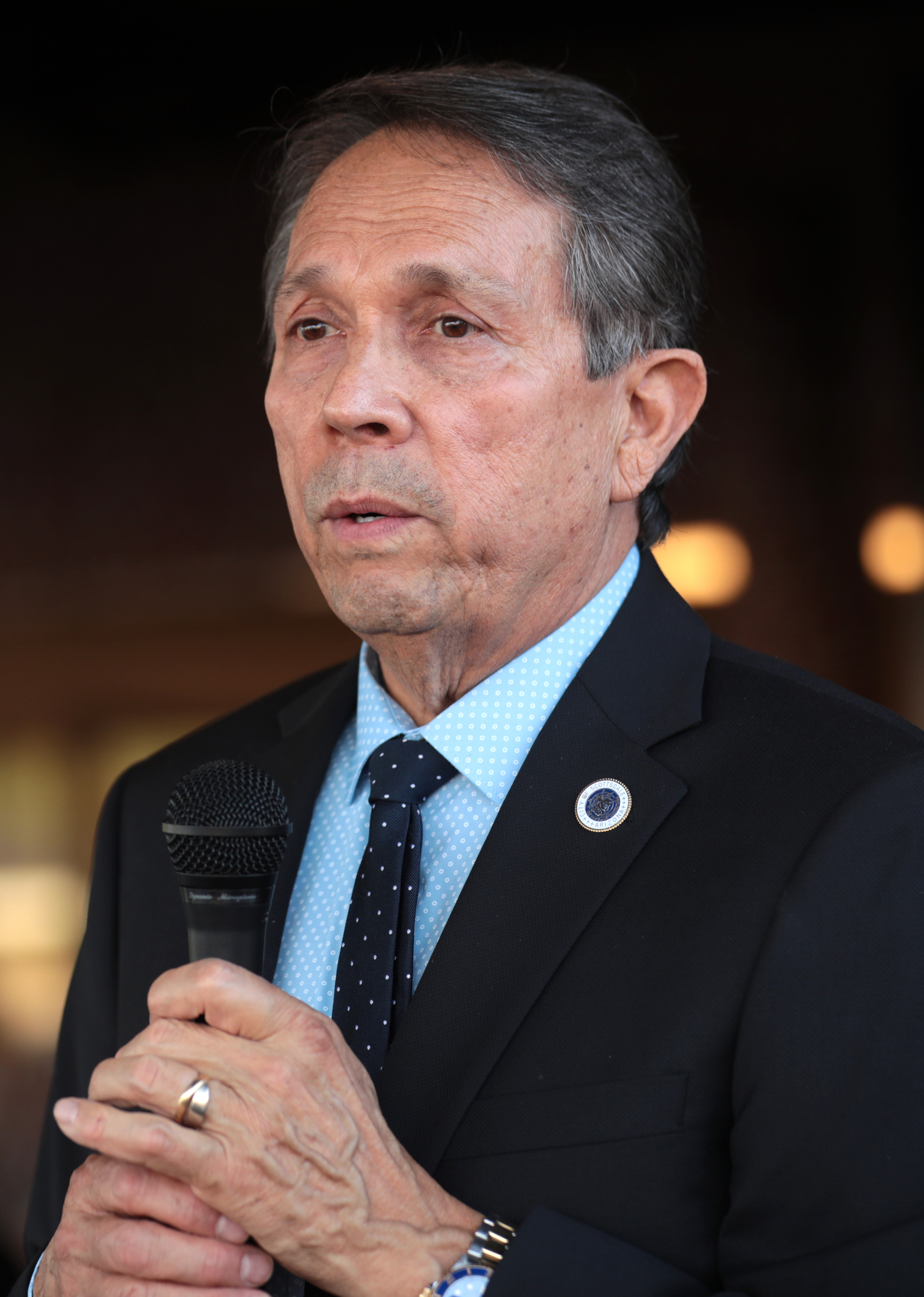
Candidate	Lisa Borowsky	David Ortega
Party	Nonpartisan	Nonpartisan
Popular vote	71,089	59,900
Percentage	54.1%	45.6%
- Precinct results Borowsky: 40–50% 50–60% 60–70% Ortega: 50–60% 60–70%
Mayor before election
David Ortega
Independent
Elected mayor
Lisa Borowsky
Republican

The 2024 Scottsdale mayoral election was held on November 5, 2024, to elect the mayor of Scottsdale, Arizona. Incumbent mayor David Ortega ran for a second term and was defeated in the general election by Lisa Borowsky.

== Background ==
David Ortega won his first election back in 2020, against Lisa Borowsky, who is his opponent once again. The two advanced to a runoff back in July, after defeating City Councilwoman, Linda Milhaven. David Ortega was defeated by Attorney Lisa Borowsky, winning with 54.2% of the votes.

== Primary ==
=== Candidates ===
- David Ortega, incumbent mayor (2021-2025)
- Lisa Borowsky, attorney
- Linda Milhaven, Scottsdale City Councilwoman (District At-large)

=== Primary election ===
2024 Scottsdale mayoral Primary election
Candidate	Votes	%
Dave Ortega	24,596	40.7
Lisa Borowsky	23,439	38.7
Linda Milhaven	12,462	20.6

2024 Scottsdale mayoral runoff election
Candidate	Votes	%
Lisa Borowsky	58,912	54.2%
Dave Ortega	49,710	45.8%
