= 2024 Huntington mayoral election =

The 2024 Huntington, West Virginia municipal election was held on November 5, 2024, to elect members of the city council and mayor.

== Mayor ==
2024 Huntington mayoral election
- November 5, 2024

Nominee	Patrick Farrell	Jennifer Wheeler	Jay Michaels
Party	Republican	Democratic	Independent
Popular vote	7,355	6,934	808
Percentage	48.72%	45.93%	5.35%
Results by precinct
Farrell:
40–50%
50–60%
60–70%
Wheeler:
50–60%
60–70%
70–80%
Mayor before election
Stephen T. Williams
Democratic
Elected mayor
Patrick Farrell
Republican

On March 5, 2024, incumbent Steve Williams is term-limited and can not run for reelection, instead running for governor. Jennifer Wheeler and Dan Ferguson ran as Democrats. Patrick Farrell, Andy Battista, and Richard Luther entered the race as Republicans. Jay Michaels filed to run as an independent, and will appear on the general election ballot.

=== Democratic primary ===
==== Nominee ====
- Jennifer Wheeler, Director of Development at Huntington Museum of Art and former Chairwoman of Huntington City Council (2021) for District 4 (2017–2021)

==== Eliminated in primary ====
- Dan Ferguson, retired magistrate judge, former police officer, and U.S. Coast Guard veteran

Democratic primary results
Party	Candidate	Votes	%
Democratic	Jennifer Wheeler	2,567	70.62%
Democratic	Dan Ferguson	1,068	29.38%
Total votes		3,635	100.00%

=== Republican primary ===
==== Nominee ====
- Patrick Farrell, business owner and U.S. Air Force veteran

==== Eliminated in primary ====
- Andy Battista, Vietnam War veteran
- Richard Luther

Republican primary results
Party	Candidate	Votes	%
Republican	Patrick Farrell	2,029	66.92%
Republican	Andy Battista	814	26.85%
Republican	Richard Luther	189	6.23%
Total votes		3,032	100.00%

=== Third-party and independent candidates ===
==== Declared ====
- Jay Michaels (Independent), entertainment industry professional and home renovation specialist

=== General election ===
2024 Huntington, West Virginia mayoral election
Party	Candidate	Votes	%
Republican	Patrick Farrell	7,355	48.72%
Democratic	Jennifer Wheeler	6,934	45.93%
Independent	Jay Michaels	808	5.35%
Total votes		15,097	100.00%
Republican gain from Democratic			

== City Council ==
2024 Huntington City Council elections
- November 5, 2024

All 11 seats on the Huntington City Council 6 seats needed for a majority
	Majority party	Minority party
Party	Democratic	Republican
Seats before	9	2
Seats won	6	5
Seat change	▼3	▲3

All 11 of Huntington's City Council seats are up for election. Huntington will elect 9 members from single-member districts and 2 members from an at-large district.

=== At-Large District ===
==== Democratic primary ====
===== Advanced to general election =====
- DuRon Jackson, incumbent At-large councilman
- Ally Layman, incumbent District 9 councilwoman

===== Eliminated in primary =====
- Drew Ciccarello, former dean of the College of Business at Alderson Broaddus University

Democratic primary results
Party	Candidate	Votes	%
Democratic	Ally Layman	2,360	46.09%
Democratic	DuRon Jackson (incumbent)	2,034	39.73%
Democratic	Drew Ciccarello	726	14.18%
Total votes		5,120	100.00%

==== Republican primary ====
===== Advanced to general election =====
- Rob Archer, associate principal at Huntington High School
- Greg Martin

===== Eliminated in primary =====
- Tommy Matty, business owner

Republican primary results
Party	Candidate	Votes	%
Republican	Rob Archer	2,034	55.32%
Republican	Greg Martin	981	26.68%
Republican	Tommy Matty	662	18.00%
Total votes		3,677	100.00%

==== General Election ====
General election results
Party	Candidate	Votes	%
Democratic	Ally Layman	6,581	28.39%
Republican	Rob Archer	6,096	26.29%
Democratic	DuRon Jackson (incumbent)	5,920	25.54%
Republican	Greg Martin	4,585	19.78%
Total votes		23,182	100.00%
Democratic hold			
Republican gain from Democratic			

=== District 1 ===
==== Republican primary ====
===== Nominee =====
- Jason Arthur, business owner and high school coach

===== Eliminated in primary =====
- Eric S. Kilgore
- Kevin Dale Maynard

Republican primary results
Party	Candidate	Votes	%
Republican	Jason Arthur	206	50.99%
Republican	Kevin Dale Maynard	108	26.73%
Republican	Eric S. Kilgore	90	22.28%
Total votes		404	100.00%

==== Democratic primary ====
===== Nominee =====
- Sasha Chapman, clinical specialist

Democratic primary results
Party	Candidate	Votes	%
Democratic	Sasha Chapman	299	100.00%
Total votes		299	100.00%

==== General election ====
General election results
Party	Candidate	Votes	%
Republican	Jason Arthur	1,132	62.30%
Democratic	Sasha Chapman	685	37.70%
Total votes		1,817	100.00%
Republican hold			

=== District 2 ===
==== Republican primary ====
===== Nominee =====
- Todd Sweeney, incumbent District 2 councilman

Republican primary results
Party	Candidate	Votes	%
Republican	Todd Sweeney (incumbent)	245	100.00%
Total votes		245	100.00%

==== Democratic primary ====
===== Nominee =====
- David S. Clark, former journalist, restaurant manager, and teacher

===== Eliminated in primary =====
- Steve Marcum, automotive business owner, welder, and plumber

Democratic primary results
Party	Candidate	Votes	%
Democratic	David S. Clark	115	52.51%
Democratic	Steve Marcum	104	47.49%
Total votes		219	100.00%

==== General election ====
General election results
Party	Candidate	Votes	%
Republican	Todd Sweeney (incumbent)	770	55.56%
Democratic	David S. Clark	616	44.44%
Total votes		1,386	100.00%
Republican hold			

=== District 3 ===
==== Democratic primary ====
===== Nominee =====
- Tia "Fix" Rumbaugh, incumbent District 3 councilwoman

===== Eliminated in primary =====
- Jeffrey McKay, business owner

Democratic primary results
Party	Candidate	Votes	%
Democratic	Tia "Fix" Rumbaugh (incumbent)	58	55.77%
Democratic	Jeffrey McKay	46	44.23%
Total votes		104	100.00%

==== Republican primary ====
===== Nominee =====
- Joshua M. Garnes, business owner

===== Eliminated in primary =====
- James P. Hoffsted

Republican primary results
Party	Candidate	Votes	%
Republican	Joshua M. Garnes	39	65.00%
Republican	James P. Hoffsted	21	35.00%
Total votes		60	100.00%

==== General election ====
General election results
Party	Candidate	Votes	%
Democratic	Tia "Fix" Rumbaugh (incumbent)	406	63.34%
Republican	Joshua M. Garnes	235	36.66%
Total votes		641	100.00%
Democratic hold			

=== District 4 ===
==== Democratic primary ====
===== Nominee =====
- Sarah Walling, incumbent District 4 councilwoman and Huntington City Council Chairwoman

===== Eliminated in primary =====
- Rebecca Thacker Howe

Democratic primary results
Party	Candidate	Votes	%
Democratic	Sarah Walling (incumbent)	453	75.63%
Democratic	Rebecca Thacker Howe	146	24.37%
Total votes		599	100.00%

==== Republican primary ====
===== Nominee =====
- Jim Duke, sales representative

Republican primary results
Party	Candidate	Votes	%
Republican	Jim Duke	299	100.00%
Total votes		299	100.00%

==== General election ====
General election results
Party	Candidate	Votes	%
Democratic	Sarah Walling (incumbent)	1,386	64.65%
Republican	Jim Duke	758	35.35%
Total votes		2,144	100.00%
Democratic hold			

=== District 5 ===
==== Democratic primary ====
===== Nominee =====
- Teresa Johnson, incumbent District 5 councilwoman

Democratic primary results
Party	Candidate	Votes	%
Democratic	Teresa Johnson (incumbent)	400	100.00%
Total votes		400	100.00%

==== Republican primary ====
===== Nominee =====
- Lauren Vega, manager and fitness instructor

===== Eliminated in primary =====
- Dino Battista

Republican primary results
Party	Candidate	Votes	%
Republican	Lauren Vega	95	63.33%
Republican	Dino Battista	55	36.67%
Total votes		150	100.00%

==== General election ====
General election results
Party	Candidate	Votes	%
Democratic	Teresa Johnson (incumbent)	1,116	74.25%
Republican	Lauren Vega	387	25.75%
Total votes		1,503	100.00%
Democratic hold			

=== District 6 ===
==== Democratic primary ====
===== Nominee =====
- Holly Smith Mount, incumbent District 6 councilwoman and Huntington City Council Vice Chairwoman

Democratic primary results
Party	Candidate	Votes	%
Democratic	Holly Smith Mount (incumbent)	605	100.00%
Total votes		605	100.00%

==== Republican primary ====
===== Nominee =====
- Matthew Glenn White, business owner

Republican primary results
Party	Candidate	Votes	%
Republican	Matthew Glenn White	625	100.00%
Total votes		625	100.00%

==== General election ====
General election results
Party	Candidate	Votes	%
Democratic	Holly Smith Mount (incumbent)	1,337	51.44%
Republican	Matthew Glenn White	1,262	48.56%
Total votes		2,599	100.00%
Democratic hold			

=== District 7 ===
==== Democratic primary ====
===== Nominee =====
- Mike Shockley, incumbent District 7 councilman

Democratic primary results
Party	Candidate	Votes	%
Democratic	Mike Shockley (incumbent)	317	100.00%
Total votes		317	100.00%

==== Republican primary ====
===== Nominee =====
- Jamie Springston, veteran advocate, former EMT, and U.S. Navy veteran

Republican primary results
Party	Candidate	Votes	%
Republican	Jamie Springston	241	100.00%
Total votes		241	100.00%

==== General Election ====
General election results
Party	Candidate	Votes	%
Democratic	Mike Shockley (incumbent)	903	58.18%
Republican	Jamie Springston	649	41.82%
Total votes		1,552	100.00%
Democratic hold			

=== District 8 ===
==== Democratic Primary ====
===== Nominee =====
- Pat Jones, incumbent District 8 councilman

===== Eliminated in primary =====
- Brian Byrd, chief operating officer of Huntington YMCA

Democratic primary results
Party	Candidate	Votes	%
Democratic	Pat Jones (incumbent)	138	60.00%
Democratic	Brian Byrd	92	40.00%
Total votes		230	100.00%

==== Republican Primary ====
===== Nominee =====
- Linda Blough, former retail manager

Republican primary results
Party	Candidate	Votes	%
Republican	Linda Blough	204	100.00%
Total votes		204	100.00%

==== General Election ====
General election results
Party	Candidate	Votes	%
Republican	Linda Blough	622	50.45%
Democratic	Pat Jones (incumbent)	611	49.55%
Total votes		1,233	100.00%
Republican gain from Democratic			

=== District 9 ===
==== Democratic primary ====
===== Nominee =====
- Carl Eastham, former firefighter

===== Eliminated in primary =====
- Jack Daniels, software engineer

Democratic primary results
Party	Candidate	Votes	%
Democratic	Carl Eastham	201	63.61%
Democratic	Jack Daniels	115	36.39%
Total votes		316	100.00%

==== Republican primary ====
===== Nominee =====
- Stacy Jo Holley, adult protective service investigator

===== Eliminated in primary =====
- Gary David Sawyers Jr., manager

Republican primary results
Party	Candidate	Votes	%
Republican	Stacy Jo Holley	228	56.30%
Republican	Gary David Sawyers Jr.	177	43.70%
Total votes		405	100.00%

==== General election ====
General election results
Party	Candidate	Votes	%
Republican	Stacy Jo Holley	923	58.60%
Democratic	Carl Eastham	652	41.40%
Total votes		1,575	100.00%
Republican gain from Democratic			

== Extra Links ==
Official campaign websites

- Patrick Farrell (R) for Mayor
- Jay Michaels (I) for Mayor
- Jennifer Wheeler (D) for Mayor
