= John Red Eagle =

American politician (1948–2024)

Principal chief of the Osage Nation
- In office June 2010 – January 21, 2014
- Preceded by: James Roan Gray
- Succeeded by: Scott Bighorse

Assistant chief of the Osage Nation
- In office 2006 – June 2010
- Succeeded by: Scott Bighorse

Personal details
- Born: September 21, 1948 Bartlesville, Oklahoma, U.S.
- Died: January 12, 2024 (aged 75) Tulsa, Oklahoma, U.S.
- Citizenship: Osage Nation; American
- Parent: Edward Red Eagle (father)
- Relatives: Paul Red Eagle (grandfather)
- Education: Colorado Community College; University of Oklahoma

John Denyer Red Eagle (September 21, 1948 – January 12, 2024) was an American Osage politician who served as the principal chief of the Osage Nation between June 2010 and his removal from office in January 2014. He also served as the assistant principal chief from 2006 to 2010.

== Biography ==
John Denyer Red Eagle was born in Bartlesville, Oklahoma on September 21, 1948, to Edward Red Eagle and Virginia Logan. His family, members of the Eagle Clan, included two former Osage Nation Chiefs, his father and grandfather Paul Red Eagle. John D. Red Eagle grew up in Osage County, Oklahoma and was raised in the Native American church. Both of his parents were "full blood" Osage and members of the Osage Nation. He graduated from Pawhuska High School in 1967 and then attended Oklahoma State University before graduating from Colorado Community College. He later earned another bachelor's degree from the University of Oklahoma.

He later worked as a medical technician for 32 years. He served as the assistant chief of the Osage Nation between 2006 and 2010 and was elected as principal chief in June 2010.

On January 21, 2014, Red Eagle was impeached on five of six counts and removed from office after a trial presided by Justice Jeanine Logan of the Osage Nation Supreme Court. He was also barred from ever holding office again in the nation, and replaced by Assistant chief Scott Bighorse. Red Eagle had been running for re-election before he was banned from holding office.

Red Eagle died in Tulsa on January 12, 2024.
