= Pawhuska Public Schools =

School district in Oklahoma, United States

Pawhuska Public Schools (PPS) is a school district headquartered in Pawhuska, Oklahoma. It includes Pawhuska, Nelagoney, and a small portion of Pershing.

David Cash was the superintendent until his retirement in 2023. Cash continued to work for the district in coaching sports. Chris Tanner became the new superintendent.

== Schools ==
- Pawhuska High School
  - As of 2022 the high school has Osage language as a class for world languages.
- Pawhuska Junior High
- Indian Camp Elementary
- Pawhuska Elementary
