= National Register of Historic Places listings in Osage County, Oklahoma =

Location of Osage County in Oklahoma

This is a list of the National Register of Historic Places listings in Osage County, Oklahoma.

This is intended to be a complete list of the properties and districts on the National Register of Historic Places in Osage County, Oklahoma, United States. The locations of National Register properties and districts for which the latitude and longitude coordinates are included below, may be seen in a map.

There are 23 properties and districts listed on the National Register in the county.

This National Park Service list is complete through NPS recent listings posted May 1, 2026.

== Current listings ==
	Name on the Register	Image	Date listed	Location	City or town	Description
1	Bank of Bigheart	Bank of Bigheart	November 23, 1984 (#84000311)	308 W. Main St. 36°33′43″N 96°09′42″W	Barnsdall	
2	Bank of Burbank	Bank of Burbank	November 23, 1984 (#84000314)	McCorkle and 1st Sts. 36°41′53″N 96°43′36″W	Burbank	Single-story small bank building, built in 1910, which served as a bank for 38 years and as the post office for 30 more.
3	Bank of Hominy	Bank of Hominy	November 23, 1984 (#84000316)	102 W. Main St. 36°24′55″N 96°23′40″W	Hominy	Two-story commercial building built in 1906.
4	Barnsdall Main Street Well Site	Barnsdall Main Street Well Site	October 1, 1997 (#97001153)	West of the junction of State Highway 11 and Main St. 36°33′42″N 96°09′57″W	Barnsdall	
5	Blacksmith's House	Blacksmith's House	May 7, 1979 (#79002014)	210 W. Main St. 36°39′48″N 96°20′32″W	Pawhuska	
6	Chapman-Barnard Ranch Headquarters	Chapman-Barnard Ranch Headquarters	March 2, 2001 (#01000208)	1511 County Route 4201; 36°50′47″N 96°25′22″W	Pawhuska	
7	Chief Ne-Kah-Wah-She-Tun-Kah Grave and Statue	Chief Ne-Kah-Wah-She-Tun-Kah Grave and Statue	May 22, 1979 (#79002012)	Off State Highway 18; 36°33′50″N 96°42′40″W	Fairfax	The statue of Chief Nick is life size, standing approximately five and a half feet in height, on top of a two-tiered base. Principal Chief of the Osage Ne-kah-wah-she-tun-kah (1839- 1923) is shown in leggings and skin moccasins with a blanket draped around his bare shoulder and a peace medal around his neck. A traditional Osage robe with a ribbon border wraps his lower torso. He is holding a metal-headed tomahawk in his proper left hand, close to his chest while his right hand is hidden by the blanket. He wears a single shell pendant, and his head is shaven but for the roach. This monument marks what would be the last traditional Osage burial due to the controversy surrounding a scalp that was interred with the Osage chief.
8	City Hall	City Hall	January 1, 1976 (#76001574)	118 W. Main St. 36°39′47″N 96°20′27″W	Pawhuska	
9	Fred and Adeline Drummond House	Fred and Adeline Drummond House	April 16, 1981 (#81000466)	305 N. Price Ave. 36°25′04″N 96°23′39″W	Hominy	
10	First National Bank and Masonic Lodge	First National Bank and Masonic Lodge	June 22, 1984 (#84003393)	301 N. Main St. 36°34′15″N 96°42′16″W	Fairfax	
11	Hominy Armory	Hominy Armory	May 20, 1994 (#94000482)	201 N. Regan St. 36°25′01″N 96°23′43″W	Hominy	
12	Hominy Osage Round House	Hominy Osage Round House	May 16, 1979 (#79002013)	Round House Sq. in Indian Village; 36°24′41″N 96°23′07″W	Hominy	
13	Hominy School	Hominy School	August 12, 1988 (#88001183)	200 block of S. Pettit St. 36°24′50″N 96°23′26″W	Hominy	
14	Immaculate Conception Church	Immaculate Conception Church	May 21, 1979 (#79002015)	1314 Lynn Ave. 36°40′17″N 96°19′53″W	Pawhuska	
15	Lincoln Colored School	Lincoln Colored School	December 5, 2003 (#03001238)	171 NE. Walnut; 36°34′33″N 96°42′07″W	Fairfax	
16	Marland Filling Station	Marland Filling Station	September 14, 2002 (#02000970)	102 S. Wood; 36°24′55″N 96°23′31″W	Hominy	
17	Osage Agency	Osage Agency	May 17, 1974 (#74001666)	Agency Hill; 36°39′57″N 96°20′26″W	Pawhuska	
18	Osage Bank of Fairfax	Osage Bank of Fairfax	November 23, 1984 (#84000315)	250 N. Main St. 36°34′24″N 96°42′15″W	Fairfax	
19	Osage County Courthouse	Osage County Courthouse	August 23, 1984 (#84003395)	600 Grandview Avenue; 36°39′52″N 96°20′28″W	Pawhuska	
20	Pawhuska Armory	Pawhuska Armory	May 20, 1994 (#94000485)	823 E. 8th St. 36°39′56″N 96°19′40″W	Pawhuska	
21	Pawhuska Downtown Historic District	Pawhuska Downtown Historic District	November 26, 1986 (#86002355)	Roughly bounded by Grand View Ave., E. 8th St., Leahy Ave., and E. 5th St. 36°39′51″N 96°20′25″W	Pawhuska	
22	Wolverine Oil Company Drayage Barn	Wolverine Oil Company Drayage Barn	March 4, 1998 (#97001152)	State Highway 11, 3.5 miles north of Avant; 36°32′36″N 96°04′18″W	Avant	No longer extant per Google Street View.
23	Woolaroc Ranch Historic District	Woolaroc Ranch Historic District	December 5, 2008 (#08001151)	8 miles east of the junction of State Highways 11 and 123; 36°39′47″N 96°06′36″W	Barnsdall	

== See also ==
- List of National Historic Landmarks in Oklahoma
- National Register of Historic Places listings in Oklahoma
