= Osage County, Oklahoma =

County in Oklahoma, United States

- County
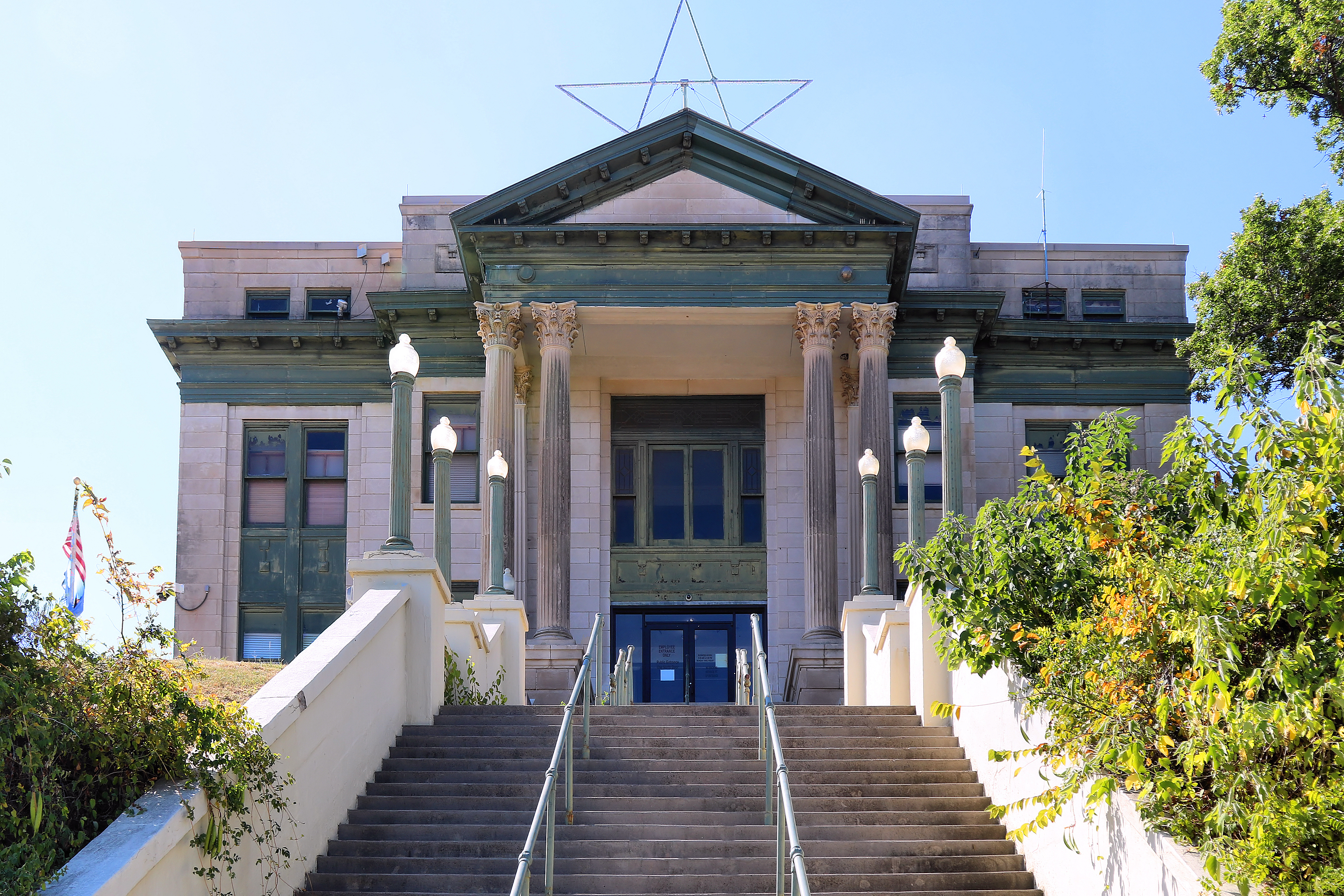
- Osage County Courthouse

- Location within the U.S. state of Oklahoma
- Coordinates: 36°38′N 96°24′W
- Country: United States
- State: Oklahoma
- Founded: 1907
- Named for: Osage Nation
- Seat: Pawhuska
- Largest city: Skiatook

Area
  - Total: 2,304 sq mi (5,970 km^{2})
  - Land: 2,246 sq mi (5,820 km^{2})
  - Water: 58 sq mi (150 km^{2}) 2.5%

Population (2020)
  - Total: 45,818
  - Estimate (2025): 46,794 ▲
  - Density: 20.40/sq mi (7.876/km^{2})
- Congressional district: 3rd
- Website: osage.okcounties.org

Osage County (/ˈoʊseɪdʒ/ OH-sayj) is the largest county by area in the U.S. state of Oklahoma. Created in 1907 when Oklahoma was admitted as a state, the county is named for and is home to the federally recognized Osage Nation. The county is coextensive with the Osage Nation Reservation, established by treaty in the 19th century when the Osage relocated there from Kansas. The county seat is in Pawhuska, one of the first three towns established in the county. The total population of the county as of 2020 was 45,818.

== History ==
During the 17th century, the Osage and other Dhegihan Siouan tribes were displaced westward from the Ohio Country following the Beaver Wars. The Osage became established as a powerful nation in the areas of present-day Missouri and Arkansas between the Missouri and Red rivers, as well as extending to the west. By 1760, they had increased their range to include the present Osage County. Historically one of the most powerful Great Plains tribes, their numbers were reduced by infectious disease and warfare after encounter with Europeans.

In 1825, they ceded their claim to the land in present-day Oklahoma to the United States government, which included it in a "perpetual outlet to the west given to the Cherokee Nation by the Treaty of New Echota" in 1835. This treaty was to accomplish Cherokee removal to the Indian Territory. During the American Civil War, on December 26, 1861, a band of pro-Union Creek and Seminole fought with a Confederate Army unit at the Battle of Chustenahlah on Bird Creek, near the present town of Skiatook. Generally the Five Civilized Tribes were allied with the Confederacy.

In 1870, the Osage finally prepared for removal from Kansas, after having negotiated payment for their land. They purchased 1.57 million acres (6,400 km^{2}) of their former territory in present-day Oklahoma from the Cherokee. By owning it by title, they had a stronger position in relation to the US government than did other tribes. The Osage Agency was established in 1872 at Deep Ford, later renamed as Pawhuska. It was designated as the county seat when Oklahoma was admitted as a state. The other chief settlements in the 1870s were Hominy and Fairfax; each of the three was settled by a major Osage band.

In 1875, the US designated their land as the Osage Reservation. Because the tribe owned the land directly, they retained more control over their affairs than did tribes whose land was held "in trust" by the United States government. This reservation became part of the Oklahoma Territory under the Oklahoma Organic Act of 1890. It became a semi-autonomous district by the Oklahoma Enabling Act of 1906, and Osage County at the time of Oklahoma Statehood in 1907. At that time, there were 2,229 registered Osage members.

As owners, the Osage negotiated the retention of the communal mineral rights to their reservation lands. In October 1897, the Phoenix Oil Company drilled the first successful oil well on the Osage reservation and in Oklahoma Territory. It was located along Butler Creek. In 1901, Phoenix Oil and Osage Oil companies combined their assets to form the Indian Territory Illuminating Oil Company (ITIO). It arranged with the Bureau of Indian Affairs to sub-lease the eastern part of the Osage reservation until 1916. When ITIO's lease expired, the United States government supervised the public auctioning of leases for 160-acre (65 ha) tracts.

All subsurface minerals, including oil, are owned by the Osage Nation and held in trust for them by the Federal Government. Each mineral lease was negotiated by the Osage National Council and approved by the U.S. Secretary of the Interior. While the government forced allotment of lands and distribution of 160-acre (65 ha) plots to tribal members for farming in the early 20th century, the tribe continued to hold their "surplus" land after the distribution. Other tribes were forced to give up such "surplus" and allow for sales to non-Indians. The Osage distributed their surplus communal land to tribal members, so that in 1906 each Osage was given a total of 657 acres (266 ha), nearly four times the amount that other Indian households received in the allotment process. Later the enrolled Osage and their descendants received oil and other mineral royalties as payments based on these "headrights".

The Burbank Oil Field was discovered in May 1920 with the Marland Oil Company's well 1 discovery. Peak production from the dome was in July 1923 at 88,950 barrels from 1020 wells, with total production of 200 million barrels by the end of 1938. Most production is from the Burbank Sand at a depth of 2700–3000 feet.

By 1920, the Osage were receiving lucrative revenues from royalties and were counted as the richest people in the country. During the 1920s, Osage County was the site of the infamous Osage Indian murders. Because of the great wealth being generated by oil, an estimated 60 tribal members were killed as whites tried to gain their headrights, royalties or land. The FBI believed that several white husbands of Osage women had committed or ordered murders of their wives. Other Osage were tricked out of their legal rights by unscrupulous white opportunists. Congress had passed a law in 1921 requiring all Osage of half or more Indian ancestry to have a guardian appointed by the court until the person proved to be "competent." Guardians were appointed by the courts even for minors with living parents. There was extensive corruption as such guardians manipulated people to give or bequeath land to them in order to get access to oil rights.

The Osage called in the FBI to help solve several murders in the Kyle family. Three white men were ultimately convicted and sentenced. But, many murders were never solved. To try to protect the Osage, Congress passed a law in 1921 limiting the inheritance of headrights only to persons who were half or more Osage in ancestry.

== Geography ==
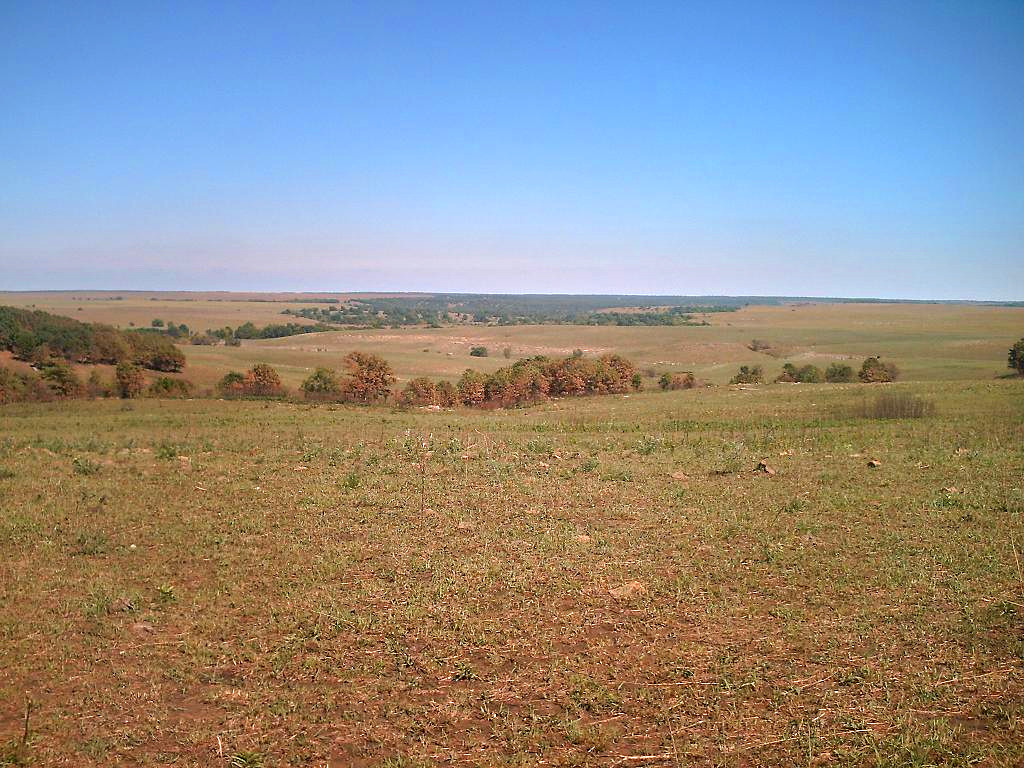
A view of Tallgrass Prairie Preserve in Osage County, Oklahoma

According to the U.S. Census Bureau, the county has a total area of 2,304 square miles (5,970 km^{2}), of which 2,246 square miles (5,820 km^{2}) is land and 58 square miles (150 km^{2}) (2.5%) is water. It is the largest county in Oklahoma by area. Most of the county is in the Osage Plains, and consists of open prairie. The western part of the county contains the Osage Hills, an extension of the Flint Hills in Kansas. Tallgrass Prairie Preserve is north of Pawhuska.

Holmes Peak is a mountain northwest of Tulsa in Osage County. It was named by the United States Board on Geographic Names on October 5, 1983, for the fictional detective, Sherlock Holmes. The name was proposed by Richard S. Warner. Holmes Peak is the highest point in the Tulsa Metropolitan area, with an elevation of 1,030 feet (310 m), though it ranks only as the 379th highest point in the state.

Gray Horse Creek, Drum Creek and Salt Creek all drain the southwestern part of the county and flow into the Arkansas River, which is part of the county's southern and western boundaries. Eastern Osage County drains into Caney River, Bird Creek, Hominy Creek, and Delaware Creek. All of these streams flow into the Verdigris River.

Lakes and reservoirs in the county include:

- Birch Lake
- Bluestem Lake
- Hulah Lake (Oklahoma)
- Kaw Lake
- Keystone Lake
- Skiatook Lake

In 2012, the Osage Nation took over management of Wah-Sha-She State Park, which includes Hulah Lake, after state budget cuts would have closed it. Hunting is allowed there. The land is owned by the US Army Corps of Engineers, which developed the lake. In 2015, the Osage subleased the renamed Wah-Sha-She Park to the Hulah Lake Osage Association (HLOA), a non-profit group which took on the task of maintaining the park through volunteer efforts. As of 2020 HLOA still had the park open, supported by campground fees.

It is the most populous and the second-largest county geographically (after Corson County, South Dakota) of the six U.S. counties that lie entirely within an Indian reservation. (The six counties in descending order of area are Corson; Osage; Oglala Lakota and Todd in South Dakota; Sioux in North Dakota; and Mahnomen in Minnesota.) Three other counties, Thurston in Nebraska; and Dewey and Ziebach in South Dakota, lie entirely in parts of two separate Indian reservations. A total of nine US counties lie entirely within reservation territory. Dewey County is slightly larger in area than Osage.

=== Adjacent counties ===
- Cowley County, Kansas (northwest)
- Chautauqua County, Kansas (north)
- Washington County (east)
- Tulsa County (southeast)
- Pawnee County (southwest)
- Kay County (west)
- Noble County (west)

== Demographics ==
Historical population
Census	Pop.	Note	%±
1910	20,101		—
1920	36,536		81.8%
1930	47,334		29.6%
1940	41,502		−12.3%
1950	33,071		−20.3%
1960	32,441		−1.9%
1970	29,750		−8.3%
1980	39,327		32.2%
1990	41,645		5.9%
2000	44,437		6.7%
2010	47,472		6.8%
2020	45,818		−3.5%
2025 (est.)	46,794	▲	2.1%
U.S. Decennial Census; 1790-1960 1900-1990; 1990-2000 2010

=== 2021 estimates ===
According to 2021 census estimates, its median household income was $54,036 and the county had a poverty rate of 12.3%.

=== 2020 census ===
As of the 2020 census, the county had a population of 45,818. Of the residents, 22.5% were under the age of 18 and 20.0% were 65 years of age or older; the median age was 43.4 years. For every 100 females there were 101.4 males, and for every 100 females age 18 and over there were 100.4 males.

The racial makeup of the county was 60.9% White, 10.6% Black or African American, 14.3% American Indian and Alaska Native, 0.3% Asian, 1.6% from some other race, and 12.3% from two or more races. Hispanic or Latino residents of any race comprised 4.1% of the population.

There were 17,554 households in the county, of which 29.6% had children under the age of 18 living with them and 25.6% had a female householder with no spouse or partner present. About 25.8% of all households were made up of individuals and 13.2% had someone living alone who was 65 years of age or older.

There were 19,602 housing units, of which 10.4% were vacant. Among occupied housing units, 78.7% were owner-occupied and 21.3% were renter-occupied. The homeowner vacancy rate was 1.5% and the rental vacancy rate was 6.1%.

=== 2010 census ===
As of the 2010 census, there were 47,472 people, 18,205 households, and 12,972 families residing in the county. The population density was 20.6 people per square mile (8.0 people/km^{2}). There were 21,143 housing units at an average density of 9.2 units per square mile (3.6/km^{2}). The racial makeup of the county was 66% White, 11.4% Black or African American, 14.4% Native American, 0.3% Asian, less than 0.1% Pacific Islander, 0.8% from other races, and 7.1% from two or more races. Almost 3% of the population were Hispanic or Latino of any race.

As of 2010, there were 18,205 households, out of which 32.6% included children under the age of 18, 54.2% were married couples living together, 12% had a female householder with no husband present, 5.1% had a male householder with no wife present, and 28.7% were non-families. Individuals living alone accounted for 24.8% of households and 10.8% had someone living alone who was 65 years of age or older. The average household size was 2.53 and the average family size was 2.99. In the county, the population was spread out, with 24.3% under the age of 18, 7.4% from 18 to 24, 23.1% from 25 to 44, 29.9% from 45 to 64, and 15.3% who were 65 years of age or older. The median age was 41.4 years. For every 100 females, there were 101.39 males. For every 100 females age 18 and over, there were more than 100 males.

As of 2010, the median income for a household in the county was $42,847, and the median income for a family was $53,815. Males had a median income of $42,658 versus $32,352 for females. The per capita income for the county was $21,797. About 11% of families and 13% of the population were below the poverty line, including 18% of those under age 18 and 11% of those age 65 or over.

== Politics ==
Voter Registration and Party Enrollment as of December 31, 2023
Party	Number of Voters	Percentage
Republican	15,686	54.85%
Democratic	8,084	28.26%
Independent/Others	4,828	16.88%
Total	28,598	100%

United States presidential election results for Osage County, Oklahoma
Year	Republican		Democratic		Third party(ies)	
Year	No.	%	No.	%	No.	%
1908	1,528	46.67%	1,584	48.38%	162	4.95%
1912	1,713	41.68%	1,900	46.23%	497	12.09%
1916	1,524	38.04%	2,052	51.22%	430	10.73%
1920	4,567	52.97%	3,801	44.08%	254	2.95%
1924	6,363	44.80%	7,070	49.78%	769	5.41%
1928	10,555	67.52%	5,010	32.05%	67	0.43%
1932	4,775	30.59%	10,833	69.41%	0	0.00%
1936	4,917	32.66%	10,090	67.02%	49	0.33%
1940	6,419	41.46%	9,019	58.26%	43	0.28%
1944	5,557	44.78%	6,846	55.17%	7	0.06%
1948	3,951	35.57%	7,156	64.43%	0	0.00%
1952	7,731	53.52%	6,714	46.48%	0	0.00%
1956	7,296	55.13%	5,939	44.87%	0	0.00%
1960	7,508	56.41%	5,801	43.59%	0	0.00%
1964	5,695	43.51%	7,395	56.49%	0	0.00%
1968	5,499	46.50%	3,919	33.14%	2,407	20.36%
1972	9,288	73.77%	2,968	23.57%	335	2.66%
1976	6,398	47.93%	6,832	51.18%	118	0.88%
1980	8,044	56.46%	5,687	39.92%	515	3.62%
1984	10,083	62.02%	6,095	37.49%	79	0.49%
1988	7,162	47.57%	7,778	51.66%	115	0.76%
1992	5,891	34.01%	6,894	39.80%	4,537	26.19%
1996	5,827	38.38%	7,342	48.36%	2,014	13.26%
2000	8,138	51.15%	7,540	47.39%	231	1.45%
2004	11,467	58.70%	8,068	41.30%	0	0.00%
2008	12,160	61.86%	7,498	38.14%	0	0.00%
2012	11,242	62.64%	6,704	37.36%	0	0.00%
2016	12,577	66.31%	5,597	29.51%	792	4.18%
2020	14,121	68.76%	6,002	29.22%	415	2.02%
2024	14,404	69.83%	5,867	28.44%	357	1.73%

== Communities ==
=== Cities ===
- Barnsdall
- Bartlesville (part)
- Hominy
- Pawhuska
- Ponca City (part)
- Sand Springs (part)
- Skiatook (part)
- Shidler
- Tulsa (part)

=== Towns ===
- Avant
- Burbank
- Fairfax
- Foraker
- Grainola
- Osage
- Prue
- Wynona

=== Census-designated places ===
- Bowring
- McCord
- Nelagoney
- Pershing
- Whippoorwill

=== Other unincorporated communities ===
- Carter Nine
- Gray Horse
- Rock
- Webb City
- Wolco

== Education ==
School districts include:

K-12:

- Barnsdall Independent School District
- Bartlesville Public Schools
- Caney Valley Public Schools
- Cleveland Public Schools
- Dewey Public Schools
- Hominy Public Schools
- Pawhuska Public Schools
- Ponca City Public Schools
- Prue Public Schools
- Sand Springs Public Schools
- Shidler Public Schools
- Skiatook Public Schools
- Sperry Public Schools
- Tulsa Public Schools
- Woodland Public Schools
- Wynona Public Schools

Elementary only:

- Anderson Public School
- Avant Public School
- Bowring Public School
- McCord Public School
- Osage Hills Public School

Former districts:

- Burbank School District 20 - ended in 2002

Private schools (from the perspective of the State of Oklahoma and the National Center for Education Statistics):

- Daposka Ahnkodapi Elementary School

== NRHP sites ==
The following sites in Osage County are listed on the National Register of Historic Places:

- Bank of Bigheart, Barnsdall
- Bank of Burbank, Burbank
- Bank of Hominy, Hominy
- Barnsdall Main Street Well Site, Barnsdall
- Blacksmith's House, Pawhuska
- Chapman-Barnard Ranch Headquarters, Pawhuska
- Chief Ne-Kah-Wah-She-Tun-Kah Grave and Statue, Fairfax
- Pawhuska City Hall, Pawhuska
- Fred and Adeline Drummond House, Hominy
- First National Bank and Masonic Lodge, Fairfax
- Hominy Armory, Hominy
- Hominy Osage Round House, Hominy
- Hominy School, Hominy
- Immaculate Conception Church, Pawhuska
- Lincoln Colored School, Fairfax
- Marland Filling Station, Hominy
- Osage Agency, Pawhuska
- Osage Bank of Fairfax, Fairfax
- Osage County Courthouse, Pawhuska
- Pawhuska Armory, Pawhuska
- Pawhuska Downtown Historic District, Pawhuska
- Wolverine Oil Company Drayage Barn, Avant
- Osage Nation Museum, Pawhuska

== In popular culture ==
Osage County is the setting of Oklahoma native Tracy Letts's play August: Osage County (2007), which won the Pulitzer Prize for Drama and a Tony Award in 2008, and the 2013 movie adaptation of the same name which stars Meryl Streep. Filming took place in rural Osage County, including Pawhuska, Barnsdall and Bartlesville.

Killers of the Flower Moon, the 2023 film directed by Martin Scorsese, centers on a series of Oklahoma murders in the Osage Nation during the 1920s. Parts of the movie were filmed on location in Osage County.

== Highways ==
- US 60
- US 64 / US 412
- SH-10
- SH-11
- SH-18
- SH-20
- SH-97
- SH-99
- SH-123
- L.L. Tisdale Parkway
- Gilcrease Expressway

== See also ==
- August: Osage County (play)
- Osage Indian Murders
- Osage in Kansas
