= Bill Long (American football) =

American football player (1926–1995)

No. 80
- Positions: End, Punter

Personal information
- Born: September 11, 1926; Lenapah, Oklahoma, U.S.
- Died: July 11, 1995 (aged 68)
- Listed height: 6 ft 1 in (1.85 m)
- Listed weight: 200 lb (91 kg)

Career information
- High school: Hominy (Hominy, Oklahoma)
- College: Oklahoma A&M (1945–1948)
- NFL draft: 1949: 5th round, 45th overall pick

Career history
- Pittsburgh Steelers (1949–1950); Dallas Texans (1952)*
- * Offseason or practice squad member only

Awards and highlights
- National champion (1945); Second-team All-Missouri Valley Conference (1948)

Career NFL statistics
- Games played: 10
- Rushing yards: 6
- Receptions: 2
- Receiving yards: 21
- Punting yards: 1,127
- Average punting: 37.6
- Longest punt: 52
- Stats at Pro Football Reference

William Gene Long (September 11, 1926 – July 11, 1995) was an American professional football end and punter for the Pittsburgh Steelers and Dallas Texans of the National Football League (NFL). He played college football for the Oklahoma A&M Cowboys.

== Early life ==
Long was born on September 11, 1926, in Lenapah, Oklahoma. He attended Hominy High School in Hominy, Oklahoma. Long earned all-state honors at end from the Tulsa Tribune, Tulsa World and The Oklahoman.

== College career ==
Long played college football for the Oklahoma A&M Cowboys from 1945 to 1948 and was a four-year letterman. He played as an end and punter for the Cowboys, earning second-team All-Missouri Valley Conference honors as a senior with 14 receptions for 234 yards.

== Professional career ==
=== Pittsburgh Steelers ===
Long was selected by the Pittsburgh Steelers in the fifth round, with the 45th overall pick, of the 1949 NFL draft. He was also selected by the Brooklyn Dodgers in the 25th round, with the 166th overall pick of the 1949 AAFC draft. In ten games for the Steelers, Long had average punt of 37.6 yards and a long of 52. He also caught two passes for21 yards and six rushing yards. At the end of the season, he became a free agent. In the offseason, Long worked as a roofer in Stillwater, Oklahoma. On July 15, 1950, he was re-signed by the Steelers. On September 11, Long was released.

=== Dallas Texans ===
On July 3, 1952, Long signed with the Dallas Texans. In between his release from the Steelers and signing with the Texans, he returned to Oklahoma A&M to obtain a master's degree. On August 17, Long was released by the team.
