= Mavis Doering =

American artist

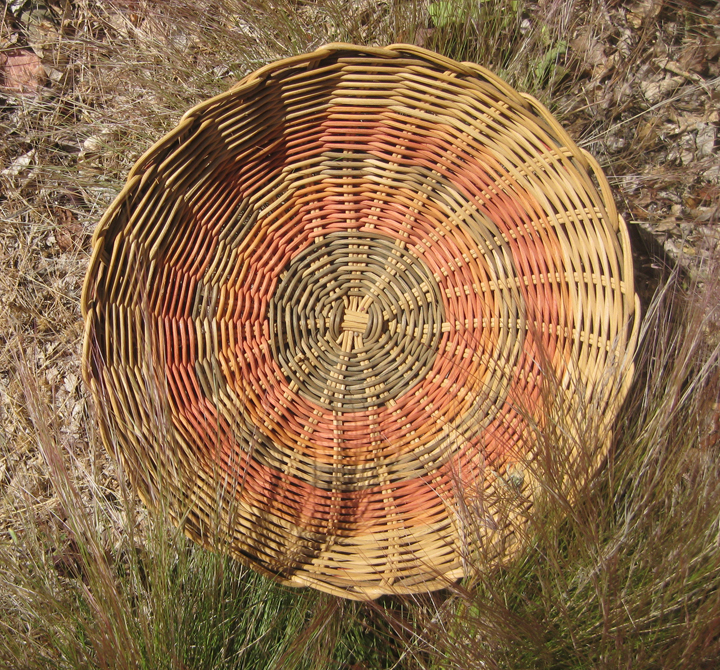
- Naturally dyed buckbrush basket, by Mavis Doering
- Born: August 31, 1929; Hominy, Oklahoma, U.S.
- Died: 2007 (aged 77–78)
- Known for: Basket weaving

Mavis Doering (1929 – 2007) was a Cherokee Nation basketmaker from Oklahoma.

== Early life ==
Doering was born in Hominy, Oklahoma and was the third generation of a family of basketmakers. She was mostly self-taught. Beginning in the 1970s, she researched weaving techniques from books in libraries and museums.

== Career ==
=== Art ===
Doering's baskets were of post-removal Cherokee basket patterns and materials, but with her own personal element such as painted elements and attached elements such as feathers and beads, baskets that honored legends, and baskets in the shape of clay pots. Most were double-walled.

She gathered her own materials and learned to make her own dyes from nut hulls, berries, and leaves, mostly obtained from her mother's allotment land near Tahlequah in Eastern Oklahoma. Basket materials she used included buckbrush, reed, honeysuckle runners, white oak splits, ash splits, rivercane, and cattail leaves. In addition to a wide range of natural dyes, Doering also experimented with brilliant aniline dyes.

=== Exhibits, honors, and legacy ===
Doering exhibited her baskets widely, including at such venues as the Southern Plains Indian Museum, Coulter Bay Indian Art Museum, Wheelwright Museum of the American Indian, Fred Jones Jr. Museum of Art, Oklahoma Historical Society, the Kennedy Center in Washington DC, and the Smithsonian Institution Folklife Festival. In 1982 and 1983, she received majors commissions from the Oklahoma State Arts Council for over 50 baskets.

Mavis Doering taught several contemporary Cherokee basketmakers, including Peggy Brennan, how to weave double-walled baskets.
