= Bryan W. Nolen =

American architect

- Died: 17 October 1959
- Occupation: Architect

Bryan W. Nolen was an Oklahoma City, Oklahoma architect who served as a Major in the Oklahoma National Guard. He designed numerous armories built under the Works Progress Administration. He is credited with more than 20 buildings that are preserved and listed on the National Register of Historic Places.

He was a member of the Oklahoma chapter of the American Institute of Architects.

== Works ==
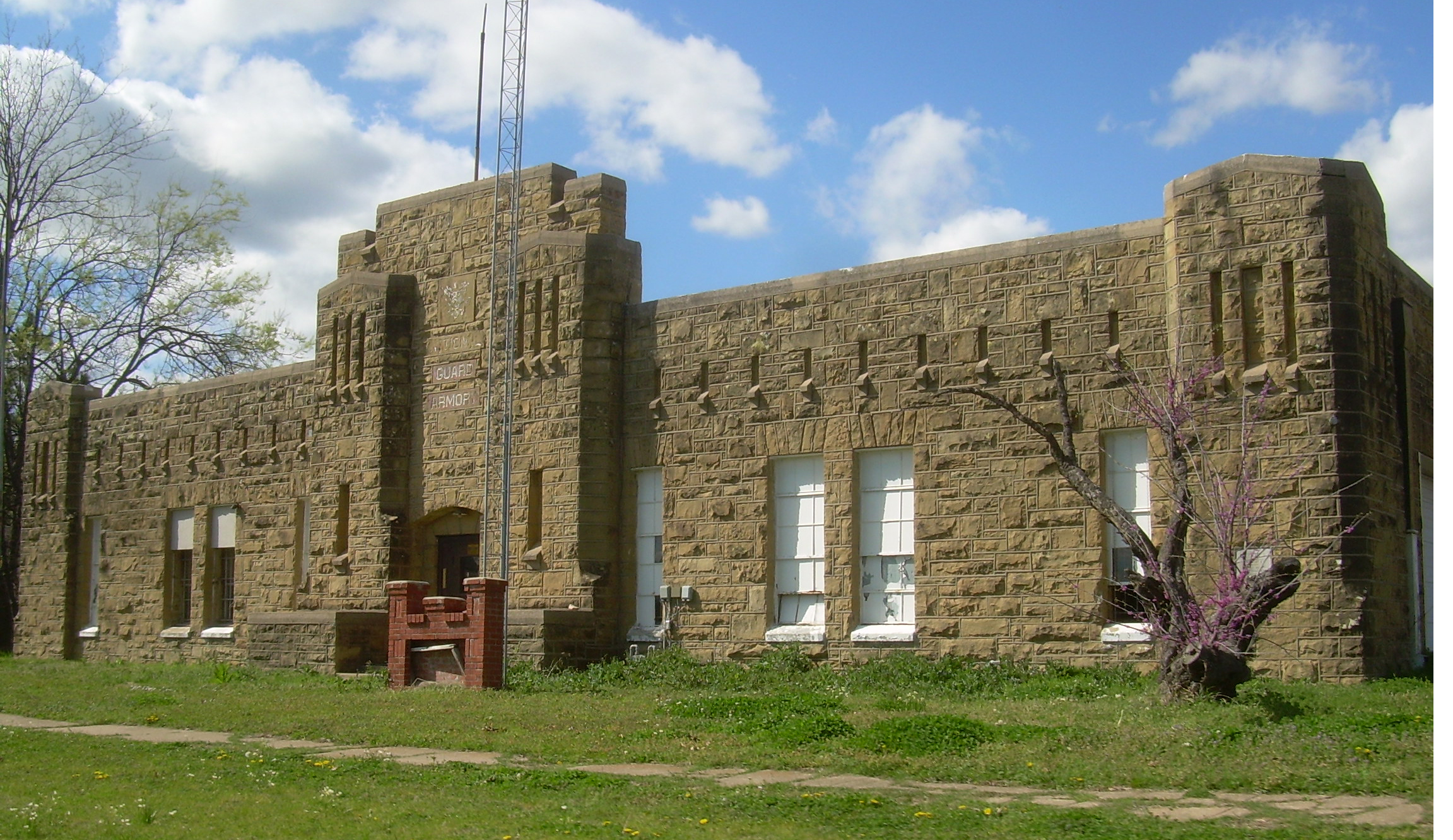
Wagoner Armory, in 2008

- Anadarko Armory, 700 W. Oklahoma St., Anadarko, OK (Nolen, Bryan W.) NRHP-listed
- Clinton Armory, 723 S. Thirteenth St., Clinton, OK (Nolen, Bryan W.) NRHP-listed
- Cushing Armory, 218 S. Little Ave., Cushing, OK (Nolen, Bryan W.) NRHP-listed
- Eufaula Armory, 48 Memorial Dr., Eufaula, OK (Nolen, Bryan W.) NRHP-listed
- Guthrie Armory, 720 E. Logan, Guthrie, OK (Nolen, Bryan W.) NRHP-listed
- Healdton Armory, Jct. of Fourth and Franklin Sts., Healdton, OK (Nolen, Bryan W.) NRHP-listed
- Hominy Armory, 201 N. Regan St., Hominy, OK (Nolen, Bryan W.) NRHP-listed
- Kingfisher Armory, 301 N. 6th St., Kingfisher, OK (Nolen, Bryan W.) NRHP-listed
- Konawa Armory, 625 N. State St., Konawa, OK (Nolen, Bryan W.) NRHP-listed
- Mangum Armory, 115 E. Lincoln St., Mangum, OK (Nolen, Bryan W.) NRHP-listed
- Marlow Armory, 702 W. Main St., Marlow, OK (Nolen, Bryan W.) NRHP-listed
- Minco Armory, 407 W. Pontotoc St., Minco, OK (Nolen, Bryan W.) NRHP-listed
- Okemah Armory, 405 N. 6th St., Okemah, OK (Nolen, Bryan W.) NRHP-listed
- Okmulgee Armory, Jct. of 2nd. and Alabama Sts., Okmulgee, OK (Nolen, Bryan W.) NRHP-listed
- Pawhuska Armory, 823 E. 8th St., Pawhuska, OK (Nolen, Bryan W.) NRHP-listed
- Pawnee Armory, Jct. of First and Cleveland Sts., Pawnee, OK) NRHP-listed
- Roff Armory, Jct. of Burns and N. 9th Sts., Roff, OK (Nolen, Bryan W.) NRHP-listed
- Sulphur Armory, 500 W. Wynnewood Ave., Sulphur, OK (Nolen, Bryan W.) NRHP-listed
- Tahlequah Armory, 100 Water Ave., Tahlequah, OK (Nolen, Bryan W.) NRHP-listed
- Tishomingo Armory, 500 E. 24th St., Tishomingo, OK (Nolen, Bryan W.) NRHP-listed
- Tonkawa Armory, Third and North Sts., Tonkawa, OK (Nolen, Bryan) NRHP-listed
- Wagoner Armory, 509 E. Cherokee St., Wagoner, OK (Nolen, Bryan W.) NRHP-listed
- Watonga Armory, 301 W. Main, Watonga, OK (Nolen, Bryan W.) NRHP-listed
- Weatherford Armory, 123 W. Rainey St., Weatherford, OK (Nolen, Bryan W.) NRHP-listed
- 23rd Street Armory, 200 N.E. 23rd St., Oklahoma City, Oklahoma, within the State Capitol, 1935
- Lincoln Park Armory (officially Lincoln Park clubhouse), 2145 NE 36, Oklahoma City, Oklahoma, now houses the 45th Infantry Division Museum, 1936
