= Les Graham =

Les Graham may refer to:

- Leslie Graham, British motorcycle road racer
- Leslie Graham (footballer), English footballer and manager
- Les Graham (American football), American football player
