= Bob Hudson (running back) =

American football player (born 1948)

No. 23, 36
- Position: Running back

Personal information
- Born: March 21, 1948 (age 78); Hominy, Oklahoma, U.S.
- Listed height: 5 ft 11 in (1.80 m)
- Listed weight: 210 lb (95 kg)

Career information
- High school: Hominy
- College: Northeastern State
- NFL draft: 1972: 6th round, 147th overall pick

Career history
- Green Bay Packers (1972); Oakland Raiders (1973–1974)
- Stats at Pro Football Reference

Bob Hudson (born March 21, 1948) is a former running back in the National Football League (NFL).

== Biography ==
Hudson was born Robert Dale Hudson in Hominy, Oklahoma. He played at the collegiate level at Northeastern State University. At Northeastern State, he set school records for rushing yardage, longest touchdown run (99 yards), highest rushing yards average per season and most carries in a season.

== Career ==
Hudson was drafted by the Green Bay Packers in the sixth round of the 1972 NFL draft and played that season with the team. The following two seasons he played with the Oakland Raiders. During his time with Oakland, Hudson was nicknamed "Headhunter" for his exceptional hits and tackles on the Raiders' special teams. In 1975, his knee was injured in a preseason game against the Atlanta Falcons, and the injury wound up ending his football career.

== Post-Career ==
Hudson had difficulty adjusting to his post-NFL life. In a 1990 interview, Hudson said, "The transition a lot of professional athletes go through takes a long time. In my case, it took almost five years. "When you're playing football, it's an artificial high. All you know is sports. When that's taken away, you try to find something to replace it. I tried alcohol and drugs." He was involved in an automobile crash in 1976, during which he was driving 85 miles an hour while drunk. In the wake of the wreck, he decided to return to Oklahoma and turn his life around.

Hudson went on to earn his college degree in Physical Education in 1983, and worked as a substitute teacher in Bartlesville, Oklahoma. in 1988, he took a position as the Physical Education Director of the Bartlesville Boys Club. He has used that position to spread an anti-drug abuse message, and has also spoken out against drugs at area churches and schools.

In 1988, Hudson was named to the Northeastern Athletics Hall of Fame.
