= McCord, Oklahoma =

- CDP
- Location within the state of Oklahoma
- Coordinates: 36°40′47″N 97°02′04″W
- Country: United States
- State: Oklahoma
- County: Osage

Area
  - Total: 4.38 sq mi (11.35 km^{2})
  - Land: 4.37 sq mi (11.33 km^{2})
  - Water: 0.012 sq mi (0.03 km^{2})
- Elevation: 1,056 ft (322 m)

Population (2020)
  - Total: 1,418
  - Density: 324.2/sq mi (125.18/km^{2})
- Time zone: UTC-6 (Central (CST))
  - Summer (DST): UTC-5 (CDT)
- FIPS code: 40-44925
- GNIS feature ID: 2408197

McCord is a census-designated place (CDP) in Osage County, Oklahoma, United States. As of the 2020 census, McCord had a population of 1,418.

== Geography ==
McCord is located adjacent to the southern boundary of Ponca City.

According to the United States Census Bureau, McCord has a total area of 4.4 square miles (11 km^{2}), of which 4.4 square miles (11 km^{2}) is land and 0.01 square miles (0.026 km^{2}) (0.23%) is water.

== Demographics ==
Historical population
Census	Pop.	Note	%±
2000	1,711		—
2010	1,440		−15.8%
2020	1,418		−1.5%
U.S. Decennial Census

=== 2020 census ===
As of the 2020 census, McCord had a population of 1,418. The median age was 47.0 years. 20.6% of residents were under the age of 18 and 20.5% of residents were 65 years of age or older. For every 100 females there were 112.9 males, and for every 100 females age 18 and over there were 108.1 males age 18 and over.

59.8% of residents lived in urban areas, while 40.2% lived in rural areas.

There were 583 households in McCord, of which 24.2% had children under the age of 18 living in them. Of all households, 59.7% were married-couple households, 18.4% were households with a male householder and no spouse or partner present, and 15.6% were households with a female householder and no spouse or partner present. About 25.8% of all households were made up of individuals and 12.5% had someone living alone who was 65 years of age or older.

There were 646 housing units, of which 9.8% were vacant. The homeowner vacancy rate was 2.1% and the rental vacancy rate was 5.5%.

Racial composition as of the 2020 census
Race	Number	Percent
White	1,099	77.5%
Black or African American	2	0.1%
American Indian and Alaska Native	98	6.9%
Asian	8	0.6%
Native Hawaiian and Other Pacific Islander	7	0.5%
Some other race	35	2.5%
Two or more races	169	11.9%
Hispanic or Latino (of any race)	68	4.8%

=== 2000 census ===
As of the census of 2000, there were 1,711 people, 676 households, and 506 families residing in McCord. The population density was 393.4 inhabitants per square mile (151.9/km^{2}). There were 772 housing units at an average density of 177.5 per square mile (68.5/km^{2}). The racial makeup of the CDP was 87.73% White, 0.76% African American, 5.20% Native American, 0.41% Asian, 0.76% from other races, and 5.14% from two or more races. Hispanic or Latino of any race were 2.45% of the population.

There were 676 households, out of which 28.6% had children under the age of 18 living with them, 63.5% were married couples living together, 7.1% had a female householder with no husband present, and 25.1% were non-families. 21.2% of all households were made up of individuals, and 8.4% had someone living alone who was 65 years of age or older. The average household size was 2.53 and the average family size was 2.94.

In the CDP the population was spread out, with 25.0% under the age of 18, 6.7% from 18 to 24, 25.6% from 25 to 44, 28.5% from 45 to 64, and 14.1% who were 65 years of age or older. The median age was 41 years. For every 100 females, there were 107.1 males. For every 100 females age 18 and over, there were 99.8 males.

The median income for a household in the CDP was $39,479, and the median income for a family was $45,446. Males had a median income of $36,429 versus $20,927 for females. The per capita income for the CDP was $17,654. About 7.9% of families and 10.9% of the population were below the poverty line, including 13.8% of those under age 18 and 8.1% of those age 65 or over.

== Education ==
It is in the McCord Public School school district.

== Infrastructure ==
There is a volunteer fire department.
