= Lester Graham =

American football player (1916–1963)

- Graham, 1933

Profile
- Position: Guard

Personal information
- Born: July 1, 1916; Hominy, Oklahoma
- Died: December 17, 1963 (aged 47)
- Listed height: 6 ft 0 in (1.83 m)
- Listed weight: 215 lb (98 kg)

Career information
- High school: Hominy (OK)
- College: Tulsa (1934–1937)

Career history
- Detroit Lions (1938)

Awards and highlights
- First-team All-Missouri Valley Conference (1937); All-time Tulsa Golden Hurricane football team (1945)

Career statistics
- Games: 11
- Stats at Pro Football Reference

Lester James Graham (July 1, 1916 – December 17, 1963) was an American football player. He played college football as a guard for the Tulsa Golden Hurricane from 1934 to 1937. He also played professional football in the National Football League (NFL) for the Detroit Lions in 1938.

== Early life ==
Graham was born in Hominy, Oklahoma, or Oilton, Oklahoma. He attended Hominy High School and was selected as captain of the Tulsa World all-state high-school football team in 1933. In its selection, the newspaper wrote: "Graham is powerful, carrying 190 pounds on his rugged frame, and he has been a bulwark of strength on the Hominy team, which has an all-victorious record." Graham graduated high school in 1934. In 1939, he was selected by the Daily Oklahoman on its list of 23 all-time best football players.

== Tulsa ==
Graham, 1937

Graham attended the University of Tulsa, graduating in 1938. He played guard on both offense and defense for the Tulsa Golden Hurricane football teams from 1934 to 1937. Known as a "stocky, vicious hart driver, and a brilliant tackler," he was captain of the 1937 Tulsa football team, and was selected as a first-team guard on the 1937 All-Missouri Valley Conference football team. In designating him as the outstanding guard in the conference, the Tulsa World wrote: "There wasn't any phase of the game he didn't do well as far as the duties of his position were involved." He was also selected in 1945 on the all-time Tulsa football team.

== Detroit Lions ==
In August 1938, Graham signed a contract to play professional football for the Detroit Lions of the National Football League (NFL). He was guaranteed pay for 12 games and a bonus if the Lions won the conference; he was required to pay his own expenses in Detroit and to pay his own hospital expenses in case of injury. He appeared in 11 NFL games at guard, two as a starter, during the 1938 season.

== Family and later years ==
Graham was married to Beryl LeMaster in January 1939. They had three children: Chrissie, Calvin and Marion.

Graham served in the United States Navy during World War II. He owned and operated the Graham Oil Company in Hominy. He also operated the Graham service station in Hominy with his father Marion. He died at a Tulsa hospital in 1963 at age 47.
