= Hominy, Oklahoma =

Hominy, Oklahoma 𐒹𐓘́͘𐓨𐓘͘𐓵𐓣͘ Hą́mąðį
- Town
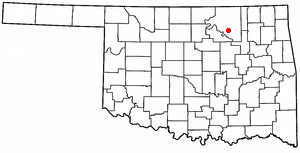
- Location of Hominy, Oklahoma
- Coordinates: 36°25′18″N 96°23′34″W
- Country: United States
- State: Oklahoma
- County: Osage

Area
  - Total: 1.97 sq mi (5.09 km^{2})
  - Land: 1.97 sq mi (5.09 km^{2})
  - Water: 0 sq mi (0.00 km^{2})
- Elevation: 758 ft (231 m)

Population (2020)
  - Total: 3,329
  - Density: 1,693.6/sq mi (653.91/km^{2})
- Time zone: UTC-6 (Central (CST))
  - Summer (DST): UTC-5 (CDT)
- ZIP code: 74035
- Area codes: 539/918
- FIPS code: 40-35850
- GNIS feature ID: 2410783

Hominy (Osage: 𐒹𐓘́͘𐓨𐓘͘𐓵𐓣͘, romanized: Hą́mąðį – night-walker) is a city in Osage County, Oklahoma, United States. (Note: One historian says that the town and creek were named for an Osage leader called Ho'n-Mo'n-I'n (pronounced "Hominy" by whites) or "Walks in the Night.") As of the 2020 census, the community had 3,329 residents. The site of Hominy was first settled by people of the Osage tribe of Native Americans (Indians) in the early 1870s.

The town was the home of an all-Native American football team in the 1920s. Parts of a docudrama on the Hominy Indians were shot in the area in 2013.

== History ==
Hominy was first settled by the Osage Indians when they were forced to leave their reservation in Kansas in the early 1870s. The Osage purchased the land of the reservation from the Cherokee. Hominy, named for chieftain Ho'n-Mo'n-I'n, was settled by the Upland Forest People, one of the five divisions of the Osage. The government of the United States established a sub-agency for the Osage near the site of present day Hominy in 1874.

Also, in 1874 a trading post called Hominy Post was established nearby. The trading post was owned by August Capitaine, a French-Osage mixed blood. A post office with the name Hominy opened in 1891. A railroad reached Hominy in 1903. Hominy had a population of 468 in 1907 and the town was incorporated in 1908. Petroleum was discovered near Hominy in 1916. The town's first mayor was Frederick Drummond who formed the Hominy Trading Company in 1903. Drummond founded the Drummond ranch near Hominy which was 433,000 acres (175,000 ha) in size in the 21st century.

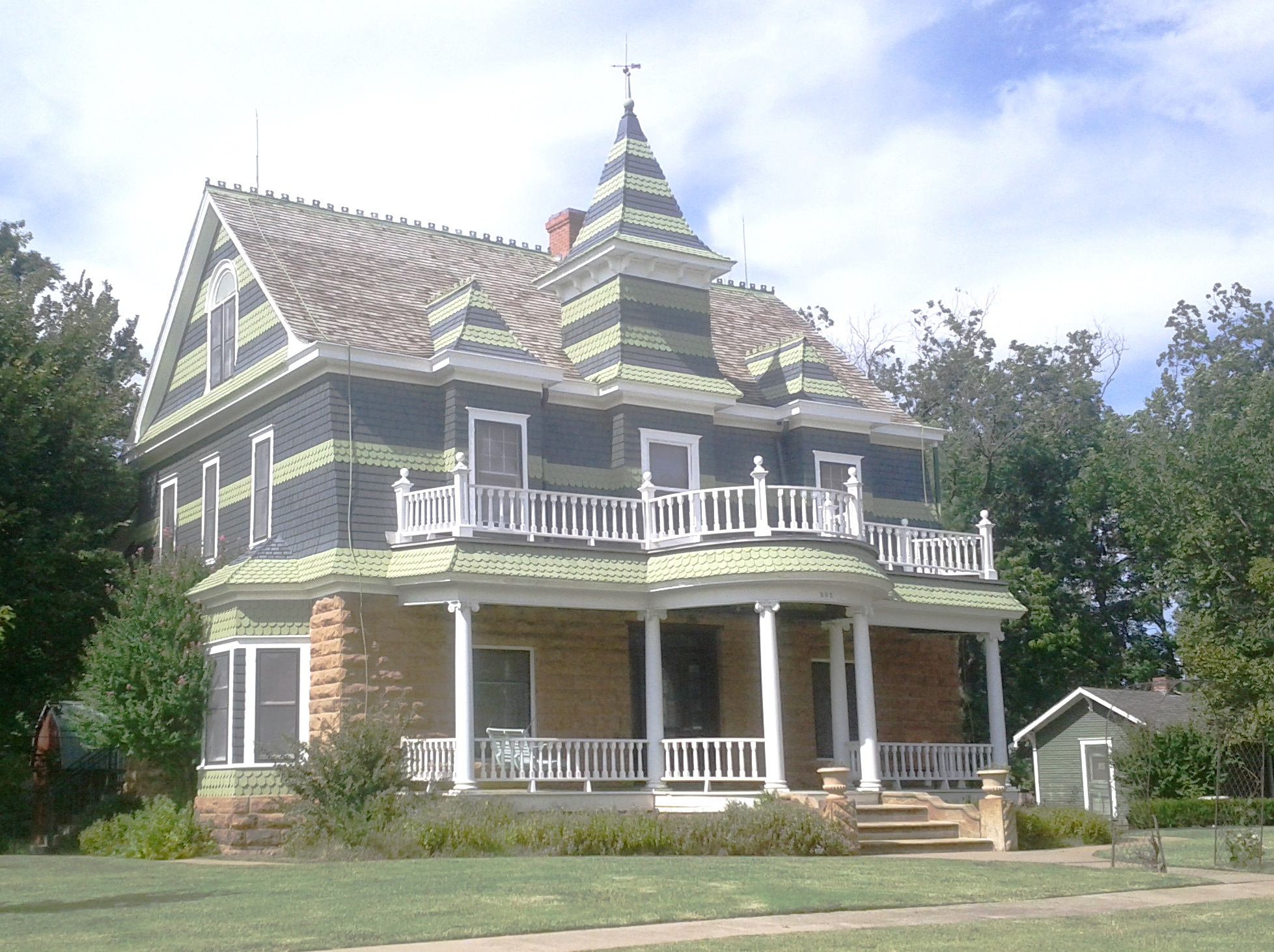
Drummond Home

The Hominy School was built in 1904.

From the early 1920s to 1932, Hominy was home to a professional football team composed of Native American players. The Hominy Indians defeated the New York Giants in 1927, just after the Giants were named champions of the National Football League. The team had a 28-game winning streak at one point during its existence, but was disbanded due to the onset of the Great Depression. A screening of the movie "Playground of the Native Son," based on the events of the team was screened on October 10, 2014, at Circle Cinema, Tulsa's non-profit independent theater.

A medium security prison was constructed in Hominy at the price of $12.8 million and received its first inmates in August 1979. It was originally named the Jess Dunn Correctional Center, in honor of Warden Jess Dunn who had been shot and killed in 1941 by prisoners during an escape attempt. A 1977 joint resolution renamed the facility the Dick Conner Correctional Center. The facility reached its original design capacity of 400 during the spring of 1980.

The prison was severely damaged by a riot that took place on August 29 and 30, 1983. A riot proclamation was issued by then Governor George Nigh on August 30. The inmates torched the buildings adjacent to the kitchen and completely destroyed the library, school, and church area. All of this resulted in the death of an inmate and damages of $3 million. The first special session of the 39th Legislature re-appropriated nearly $2.5 million to fund reconstruction of the facility.

== Geography ==
Hominy is 21 miles (34 km) south of Pawhuska, the county seat. According to the United States Census Bureau, the city has a total area of 2.0 square miles (5.2 km^{2}), all land.

Hominy is located in a geographic region locally known as the Osage Hills or "The Osage." The Osage Hills are an extension southward of the Flint Hills of Kansas, a region distinguished by rocky soils that inhibit cultivation. Large cattle ranches are characteristic of the region. The dominant vegetation is tallgrass prairie with forests found mostly along rivers and creeks.

The climate consists of hot summers and cool winters with a Koppen classification of Cfa. The town receives an average of 37 in (940 mm) of precipitation annually, mostly in the form of summer rainfall.

== Demographics ==
Historical population
Census	Pop.	Note	%±
1910	760		—
1920	2,875		278.3%
1930	3,485		21.2%
1940	3,267		−6.3%
1950	2,702		−17.3%
1960	2,866		6.1%
1970	2,274		−20.7%
1980	3,130		37.6%
1990	2,342		−25.2%
2000	2,584		10.3%
2010	3,565		38.0%
2020	3,329		−6.6%
U.S. Decennial Census

=== 2020 census ===
As of the 2020 census, Hominy had a population of 3,329. The median age was 38.2 years, 16.8% of residents were under the age of 18, and 11.7% of residents were 65 years of age or older. For every 100 females there were 194.1 males, and for every 100 females age 18 and over there were 226.5 males age 18 and over.

There were 871 households in Hominy, of which 32.5% had children under the age of 18 living in them. Of all households, 36.5% were married-couple households, 19.7% were households with a male householder and no spouse or partner present, and 36.4% were households with a female householder and no spouse or partner present. About 32.1% of all households were made up of individuals and 14.5% had someone living alone who was 65 years of age or older. There were 1,043 housing units, of which 16.5% were vacant. Among occupied housing units, 62.6% were owner-occupied and 37.4% were renter-occupied. The homeowner vacancy rate was 2.8% and the rental vacancy rate was 6.9%.

0% of residents lived in urban areas, while 100.0% lived in rural areas.

Racial composition as of the 2020 census
Race	Percent
White	52.1%
Black or African American	14.3%
American Indian and Alaska Native	19.9%
Asian	0.2%
Native Hawaiian and Other Pacific Islander	0%
Some other race	3.2%
Two or more races	10.2%
Hispanic or Latino (of any race)	5.4%

=== 2000 census ===
As of the census of 2000, there were 2,584 people, 1,021 households, and 671 families residing in the city. The population density was 1,305.0 inhabitants per square mile (503.9/km^{2}). There were 1,208 housing units at an average density of 610.1 per square mile (235.6/km^{2}). The racial makeup of the city was 64.28% White, 1.90% African American, 25.31% Native American, 0.15% Asian, 0.31% from other races, and 8.05% from two or more races. Hispanic or Latino of any race were 3.25% of the population.

There were 1,021 households, out of which 33.5% had children under the age of 18 living with them, 45.7% were married couples living together, 15.2% had a female householder with no husband present, and 34.2% were non-families. 29.6% of all households were made up of individuals, and 15.1% had someone living alone who was 65 years of age or older. The average household size was 2.50 and the average family size was 3.10.

In the city, the population was spread out, with 29.5% under the age of 18, 8.7% from 18 to 24, 24.7% from 25 to 44, 20.9% from 45 to 64, and 16.2% who were 65 years of age or older. The median age was 36 years. For every 100 females, there were 89.2 males. For every 100 females age 18 and over, there were 84.5 males.

The median income for a household in the city was $24,211, and the median income for a family was $27,578. Males had a median income of $25,476 versus $22,073 for females. The per capita income for the city was $13,073. About 19.0% of families and 22.7% of the population were below the poverty line, including 33.8% of those under age 18 and 10.1% of those age 65 or over.

== Economy ==
The town's economy is largely based in oil production and agriculture. Butcher House Meats is a meat processing facility owned and operated by the Osage Nation tribal government which processes mostly bison and cattle.

Major job providers in the area are the Osage Casino-Hominy, Cleveland Walmart, and the Dick Conner Correctional Center. Opened as a medium security facility for men in 1979, the prison is named for former Oklahoma State Penitentiary warden and Osage County sheriff R.B. "Dick" Conner.

== Government ==
Hominy has a council-manager form of government.

== Arts and culture ==
The Marland Filling Station, the Hominy School, the Hominy Osage Round House, the Hominy Armory, the Fred and Adeline Drummond House, and the Bank of Hominy are all on the National Register of Historic Places.

The MKT Train Depot built around 1910, being the former passenger station for the Missouri-Kansas-Texas Railroad, is now a museum with a number of working miniature train sets on display as well as having a full-size MKT caboose.

Hominy sports a number of open-air murals from local artist Cha' Tullis, as well as his metal sculpture "New Territory" atop a hill west of downtown.

== Parks and recreation ==
The 165-acre Hominy Municipal Lake (67 ha) has a boat ramps, a fishing dock, and other amenities.

Trains no longer run through Hominy, but the route has been converted to the Katy Trail.

== Sports and other activities ==
The Hominy Bucks, whose colors are purple and white and whose mascot is a Buck (a Native American warrior), have produced several boys and girls championship teams.

Hominy's high school football team is recognized as one of the top high school programs in the state of Oklahoma. The Bucks currently hold five state football championship titles which were won in 1973, 1982, 1983, 2001 and 2016. The team narrowly lost state championship games in 1959, 1968 and 1972. The team has won 25 district championships and have only missed the state playoffs twice since 1977. The football team competes in the Oklahoma Secondary Schools Activity Association (OSSAA), within the class A division. The Arkansas River Rivalry is played every year between Hominy and Cleveland High Schools and is one of the oldest rivalries in the state, dating back to 1922. The Battle of the Osage is the rivalry game between Hominy and Pawhuska and has also been played nearly annually since 1922.

Hominy's football teams have produced several notable athletes in its history of athletics. Zaven Collins who played Quarterback for Hominy High School, led the team to a State Championship in 2016. Collins later received a scholarship to attend the University of Tulsa, where he was awarded the Bronko Nagurski Trophy, the Lombardi Award, and the Chuck Bednarik Award as the nations best defensive player. Collins was later selected by the Arizona Cardinals in the first round (16th overall) of the 2021 NFL Draft. Les Graham went on to play for the Detroit Lions in their 1938 season. Reuben Deroin played for Oklahoma State University in the 1950s. Kenny Rader was Hominy's first All-State football player as well as earning Prep All-American honors in 1960. Rader went on to play football for the University of Tulsa. Running back Harry Roy Red Eagle, who signed with the University of Kansas, was selected to the Oklahoma All-State football team and the high school Prep All-American Team in 1961. Unlike today, in the early 1960s there was only one high school All-American team in the United States. Red Eagle is also the only player from Hominy High School to have his jersey number (#30) retired in 1961; running back Bob Hudson was another stellar player whose family produced a number of great athletes that have played for the Bucks. Hudson played for the Green Bay Packers in 1972 and the Oakland Raiders 1973-1974; defensive back Jesse Hudson played for the New York Giants in 1977; former University of Oklahoma defensive back Scott Garl; defensive back Mike Hudson played collegiately for the Oklahoma State Cowboys and for the San Diego Chargers in 1987. Hominy's former head football coach Scott Harmon played defensive back at Oklahoma State University as well.

Hominy's Boys Basketball Teams have also had success on the court and have won two state championship titles in 1945 and 1982.

Along with producing numerous individual state champions the Hominy Boys Track and Field teams have produced four state team titles which were won in 1976, 1981, 1983 and 2000.

The athletic programs have seen many Bucks and Lady Bucks garner All-State recognition in football, basketball, and track.

The Hominy High School Band was the Class 1A champion and came in 9th overall at 1A - 3A OBA in 2000.

The high school cheerleading squad has won five state championships, in 1990, 1992, 1993, 2007 and 2011.

== Education ==
It is within the Hominy Public Schools school district.

The Osage Nation Education Department is headquartered near Hominy.

== Transportation ==
Hominy, northwest of Tulsa, is at the intersection of SH-20 and SH-99.

Hominy Municipal Airport (FAA ID: H92), two miles north of town, features a 3210' x 60' paved runway.

Commercial air service is available out of Tulsa International Airport, about 42 miles southeast.

== Notable people ==
- Mildred Andrews Boggess (1915-1987), Pipe organ Professor at the University of Oklahoma
- Zaven Collins (b. 1999), Linebacker for the Arizona Cardinals.
- Mavis Doering (1929–2007), award-winning Cherokee basketweaver and educator
- Gentner Drummond (b. 1963), Lawyer, businessman and Attorney General of Oklahoma
- Floyd Gass (1927-2006), football coach at Oklahoma State University
- Bob Hudson (b. 1948), NFL player
- Kenneth M. Taylor (1919–2006), brigadier general during World War II
