= Whippoorwill, Oklahoma =

- Census-designated place
- Location within Oklahoma Location within the United States
- Coordinates: 36°54′44″N 96°07′43″W
- Country: United States
- State: Oklahoma
- County: Osage

Area
  - Total: 0.22 sq mi (0.58 km^{2})
  - Land: 0.20 sq mi (0.53 km^{2})
  - Water: 0.019 sq mi (0.05 km^{2})
- Elevation: 794 ft (242 m)

Population (2020)
  - Total: 75
  - Density: 369.9/sq mi (142.82/km^{2})
- Time zone: UTC-6 (Central (CST))
  - Summer (DST): UTC-5 (CDT)
- ZIP Code: 74056 (Pawhuska)
- Area codes: 918/539
- FIPS code: 40-80675
- GNIS feature ID: 2812863

Whippoorwill is an unincorporated community and census-designated place (CDP) in Osage County, Oklahoma, United States. It was first listed as a CDP prior to the 2020 census. As of the 2020 census, Whippoorwill had a population of 75.

The CDP is in northeastern Osage County, on a hill overlooking the west end of Hulah Lake, where the Caney River enters it. The Caney is a southeast-flowing tributary of the Verdigris River and part of the Arkansas River watershed.

Whippoorwill is 3 miles (5 km) north of Bowring and 24 miles (39 km) northeast of Pawhuska, the Osage county seat.

== Demographics ==
=== 2020 census ===
As of the 2020 census, Whippoorwill had a population of 75. The median age was 50.3 years. 14.7% of residents were under the age of 18 and 26.7% of residents were 65 years of age or older. For every 100 females there were 66.7 males, and for every 100 females age 18 and over there were 56.1 males age 18 and over.

0.0% of residents lived in urban areas, while 100.0% lived in rural areas.

There were 36 households in Whippoorwill, of which 33.3% had children under the age of 18 living in them. Of all households, 33.3% were married-couple households, 30.6% were households with a male householder and no spouse or partner present, and 33.3% were households with a female householder and no spouse or partner present. About 33.3% of all households were made up of individuals and 13.9% had someone living alone who was 65 years of age or older.

There were 55 housing units, of which 34.5% were vacant. The homeowner vacancy rate was 14.7% and the rental vacancy rate was 30.0%.

Racial composition as of the 2020 census
Race	Number	Percent
White	53	70.7%
Black or African American	1	1.3%
American Indian and Alaska Native	15	20.0%
Asian	0	0.0%
Native Hawaiian and Other Pacific Islander	0	0.0%
Some other race	0	0.0%
Two or more races	6	8.0%
Hispanic or Latino (of any race)	1	1.3%

== Education ==
It is in the Bowring Public School school district.
