= Gray Horse, Oklahoma =

Gray Horse
- Unincorporated community
- Location within the state of Oklahoma Gray Horse (the United States)
- Coordinates: 36°32′59″N 96°38′52″W
- Country: United States
- State: Oklahoma
- County: Osage
- Elevation: 922 ft (281 m)
- Time zone: UTC-6 (Central (CST))
  - Summer (DST): UTC-5 (CDT)
- GNIS feature ID: 1093342

Gray Horse is an unincorporated community in Osage County, Oklahoma, United States. The post office was established May 5, 1890, and discontinued December 31, 1931. It was named for Gray Horse (Ko-wah-hos-tsa), an Osage medicine man.

Gray Horse and the surrounding towns of Fairfax and Pawhuska feature prominently in the Osage Murders, which took place in the early 1920s. The towns had grown exceedingly wealthy due to the discovery and drilling of nearby oil fields, and the resident Osage tribe members began to live lifestyles that befitted their newly acquired economic status. This time period and the circumstances and effects of the murders on the community of Gray Horse have been documented in David Grann's 2017 book Killers of the Flower Moon: The Osage Murders and the Birth of the FBI.

David Grann of The New Yorker described it as, within the Osage Nation, "one of the [...] older settlements."

== Education ==
Gray Horse is zoned to Woodland Public Schools.

The Works Progress Administration built a public school in Gray Horse, which opened in 1939. That school closed in 1963. In 2019 the Osage Nation acquired the school building.

== Infrastructure ==
There is a fire department.
