= Wagoner Armory =

- U.S. National Register of Historic Places
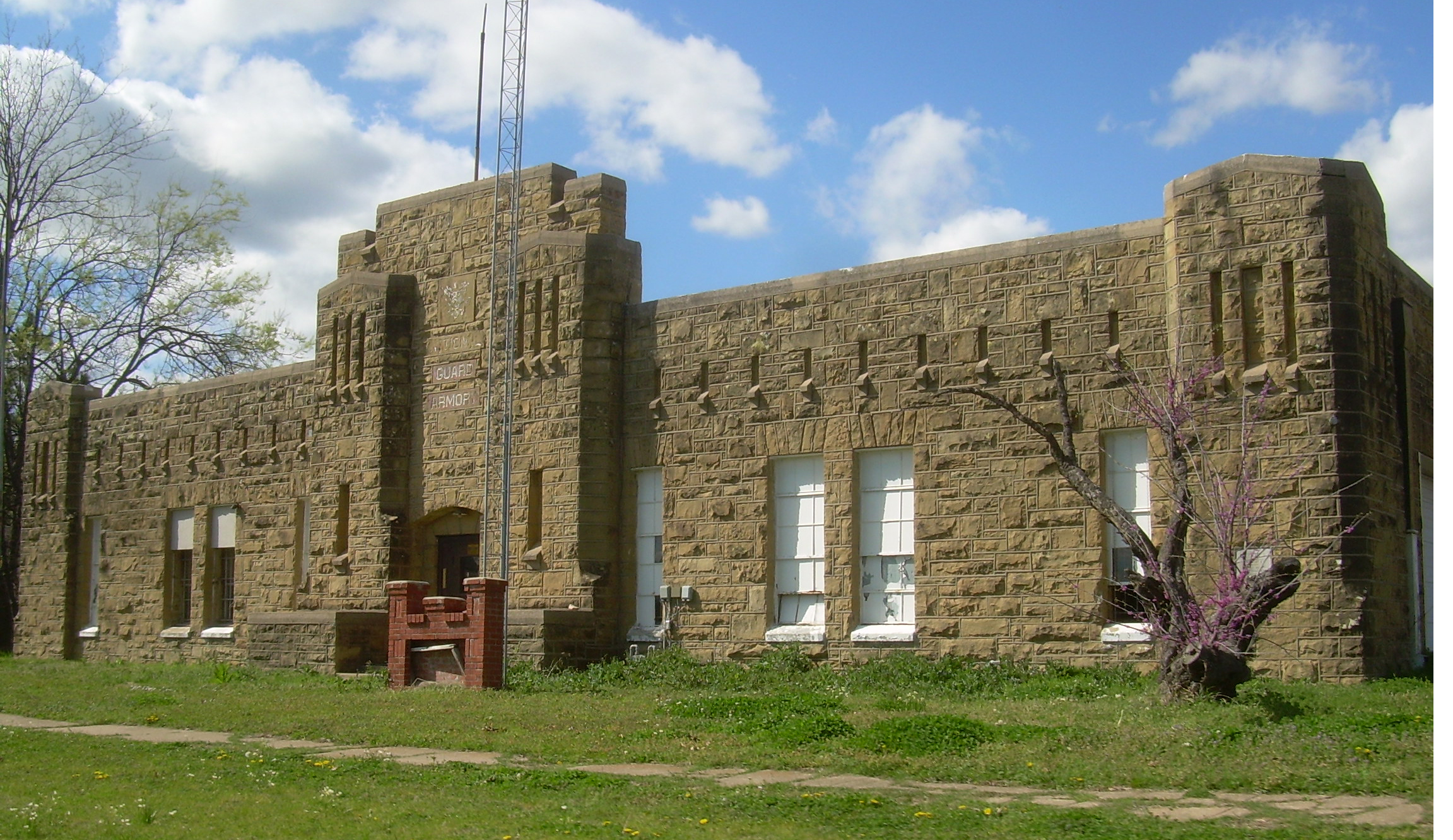

- Location within Oklahoma Location within the United States
- Location: 509 E. Cherokee St., Wagoner, Oklahoma
- Coordinates: 35°57′36″N 95°22′15″W
- Area: less than one acre
- Built: 1937-1938
- Architect: Nolen, Bryan W.; WPA
- Architectural style: Works Progress Administration
- NRHP reference No.: 94000490
- Added to NRHP: May 20, 1994

The Wagoner Armory, also known as National Guard Armory, was built in 1938 by the Works Progress Administration in order to make jobs for unemployed workers in the area. The Oklahoma National Guard used the building since it was built, until it was abandoned along with 58 other armories in the state of Oklahoma after they were ordered to be closed in 2006 by the federal Base Realignment and Closure Commission.

The Wagoner Armory, like many other armories, was contaminated with lead from bullets fired in their underground rifle ranges and from asbestos. The Oklahoma Department of Environmental Quality cleaned the facility up as part of its Site Cleanup Assistance Program.

The municipal government of Wagoner, Oklahoma took over ownership on October 22, 2009.

The city is not exactly sure what their plans are for the armory but they are thinking about letting different groups use it, such as some senior citizen groups.
