= Carter Nine, Oklahoma =

- Unincorporated community
- Location within Oklahoma
- Coordinates: 36°44′41″N 96°39′41″W
- Country: United States
- State: Oklahoma
- County: Osage
- Elevation: 1,122 ft (342 m)
- Time zone: UTC-6 (Central (CST))
  - Summer (DST): UTC-5 (CDT)
- ZIP code: 74634
- Area codes: 539/918
- GNIS feature ID: 1091010

Carter Nine was an unincorporated community in Osage County, Oklahoma, United States, located 2.5 miles (4.0 km) south of Shidler. Carter Nine had a post office, which opened on August 14, 1928. Carter Nine began as a company-owned town to house workers for an oil refinery operated by the Carter Oil Company. The company originally planned to build housing in Burbank, but decided the cost would be too high. Instead it created its own town in 1922, known as Carter Nine. The name Carter Nine was derived from a combination of the Carter Oil Company and the community's location in Section 9 of Township 26 North, Range 6 East.

The fenced and gated town initially contained fifty houses. As the community grew during the 1920s, another 50 private homes were built outside the fence. The community had its own school, with a faculty of eight teachers. It also had a post office, general store, service station, company offices and a large naphtha plant.

The refinery was transferred to Skelly Oil Company and then to Phillips Petroleum Company before its permanent closure in 1945. The high school closed in 1942, and thereafter students attended high school in Shidler. The town was abandoned after the plant was closed in the 1950s, when only 39 houses remained, compared to a peak of 300. None of its buildings currently remain standing.
