= Bowring, Oklahoma =

Bowring
- Unincorporated community and Census designated place
- Location within the state of Oklahoma Bowring (the United States)
- Coordinates: 36°52′41″N 96°07′12″W
- Country: United States
- State: Oklahoma
- County: Osage

Area
  - Total: 0.20 sq mi (0.52 km^{2})
  - Land: 0.20 sq mi (0.52 km^{2})
  - Water: 0 sq mi (0.00 km^{2})
- Elevation: 814 ft (248 m)

Population (2020)
  - Total: 78
  - Density: 391.8/sq mi (151.27/km^{2})
- Time zone: UTC-6 (Central (CST))
  - Summer (DST): UTC-5 (CDT)
- ZIP codes: 74056
- Area code: 918
- FIPS code: 40-08000
- GNIS feature ID: 2804702

Bowring is an unincorporated community and Census designated place in Osage County, Oklahoma, United States. As of the 2020 census, Bowring had a population of 78. The post office was established November 12, 1923. It is said to have been named from the combination of the names of two local ranchers, Mart Bowhan and Richard Woodring.

== Geography ==
Bowring is located in northern Osage County, approximately 12 miles (19 km) northwest of the city of Bartlesville, and approximately 19 miles (31 km) northeast of Pawhuska, the county seat of Osage County. Bowring is also approximately 8.4 miles (13.5 km) south of the Oklahoma–Kansas state line. Bowring is served by Oklahoma State Highway 10 (SH-10), which runs from the nearby town of Copan from the east and the unincorporated hamlet of Herd to the west.

== Demographics ==
Historical population
Census	Pop.	Note	%±
2020	78		—
U.S. Decennial Census

=== 2020 census ===
As of the 2020 census, Bowring had a population of 78. The median age was 45.5 years. 21.8% of residents were under the age of 18 and 24.4% of residents were 65 years of age or older. For every 100 females there were 105.3 males, and for every 100 females age 18 and over there were 125.9 males age 18 and over.

0.0% of residents lived in urban areas, while 100.0% lived in rural areas.

There were 33 households in Bowring, of which 18.2% had children under the age of 18 living in them. Of all households, 42.4% were married-couple households, 30.3% were households with a male householder and no spouse or partner present, and 21.2% were households with a female householder and no spouse or partner present. About 45.5% of all households were made up of individuals and 12.1% had someone living alone who was 65 years of age or older.

There were 36 housing units, of which 8.3% were vacant. The homeowner vacancy rate was 0.0% and the rental vacancy rate was 0.0%.

Racial composition as of the 2020 census
Race	Number	Percent
White	40	51.3%
Black or African American	1	1.3%
American Indian and Alaska Native	10	12.8%
Asian	0	0.0%
Native Hawaiian and Other Pacific Islander	0	0.0%
Some other race	6	7.7%
Two or more races	21	26.9%
Hispanic or Latino (of any race)	13	16.7%

== Nearby communities ==
- Whippoorwill Point (east of Bowring on SH-10)
- Hulah (this is largely a ghost town east of Bowring on SH-10)
- Herd (this is largely a ghost town west of Bowring on SH-10)

== Railroad history ==
Bowring was once served by the Atchison, Topeka & Santa Fe Railroad (AT&SF). Cattle ranchers once drove their cattle to the west side of town to be loaded onto cattle cars to be taken to markets throughout the area. The AT&SF Railroad into Bowring began in Owen Township south of nearby Caney, Kansas, in northern Washington County, through what was Hulah, east of Bowring, then south across the Caney River, then on the south side of Whippoorwill Point, through Bowring and further west into Pawhuska.

The old Hulah Depot that sat near SH-10 has since been moved to Johnstone Park in the nearby city of Bartlesville.

== Recreation and fishing ==
Bowring has two lakes nearby on SH-10: Copan Lake and Dam, west of the town of Copan on the Little Caney River, and Hulah Lake and Dam on the Caney River near the unincorporated hamlet of Whippoorwill Point. Both lakes and dams are in the United States Army Corps of Engineers Tulsa District. The lakes and dams provide flood control protection for the nearby cities of Dewey and Bartlesville. The Caney River has its confluence with the Verdigris River to the northeast of the city of Claremore and is a part of the greater Arkansas River watershed. Both the Little Caney and Caney rivers have their sources in central Kansas.

== Education ==
It is in the Bowring Public School school district.

== Climate ==
Climate data for Bowring, Oklahoma
Month	Jan	Feb	Mar	Apr	May	Jun	Jul	Aug	Sep	Oct	Nov	Dec	Year
Mean daily maximum °F (°C)	46.1 (7.8)	52.1 (11.2)	62.6 (17.0)	73.6 (23.1)	79.7 (26.5)	87.2 (30.7)	93.3 (34.1)	92.8 (33.8)	84.3 (29.1)	74.5 (23.6)	60.5 (15.8)	49.1 (9.5)	71.3 (21.8)
Mean daily minimum °F (°C)	22 (−6)	26.9 (−2.8)	36.5 (2.5)	47.7 (8.7)	56.2 (13.4)	65 (18)	69.8 (21.0)	67.6 (19.8)	60.3 (15.7)	47.9 (8.8)	36.7 (2.6)	26 (−3)	46.9 (8.3)
Average precipitation inches (mm)	1.3 (33)	1.8 (46)	3.3 (84)	3.3 (84)	4.8 (120)	4.5 (110)	3.2 (81)	3.6 (91)	4.9 (120)	3.2 (81)	2.8 (71)	1.7 (43)	38.4 (980)
Source: Weatherbase.com

== Sources ==
- Shirk, George H. Oklahoma Place Names. Norman: University of Oklahoma Press, 1987. ISBN 0-8061-2028-2 .
