= Mildred Andrews Boggess =

American organist and educator (1915-1987)

Mildred Andrews Boggess (née Mildred Morford Andrews; September 25, 1915 – August 10, 1987) was an American professor who taught and performed the pipe organ at the University of Oklahoma for 38 years.

Mildred Morford Andrews was born in Hominy, Oklahoma, in 1915 and graduated valedictorian from Collinsville High School in 1933. She completed a bachelor's of fine arts in piano from the University of Oklahoma in 1937, and a master's in music at the University of Michigan in 1940. She also studied with Marcel Dupre at the Château de Fontainebleau near Paris. During her career, she trained fourteen Fulbright scholars and was inducted into the Oklahoma Hall of Fame in 1971.

Boggess became one of the first female organists to play at the Washington National Cathedral in Washington, DC. The organ at Catlett Music Center at the University of Oklahoma was named in her honor in 1997 after a donation from her estate and students.

She married Rough Boggess in 1973. Mildred Boggess died on August 10, 1987, aged 71.
