= Hominy Osage Round House =

Historic house in Oklahoma, United States

- Osage Round House
- U.S. National Register of Historic Places
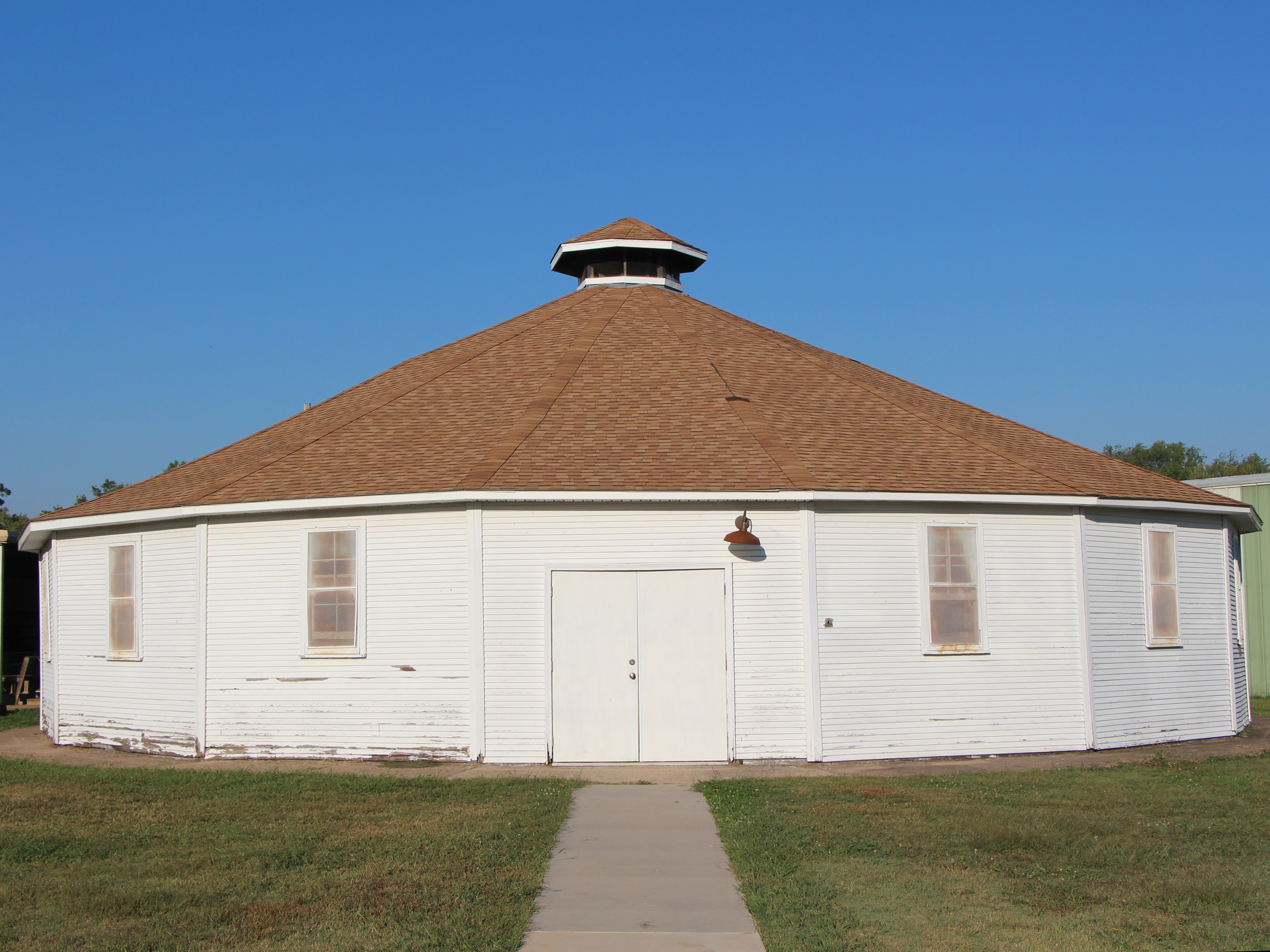

- Location within Oklahoma Location within the United States
- Location: Osage County, Oklahoma
- Nearest city: Hominy, Oklahoma
- Coordinates: 36°24′41″N 96°23′7″W
- Area: less than one acre
- Built: 1919
- NRHP reference No.: 79002013
- Added to NRHP: May 16, 1979

The Osage Round House (also known as the Zon-Zo-Li Road House) is a 16-sided structure used for Osage Ceremonial dances such as the Inlonska. It is the only such round house standing in Osage County, Oklahoma.

== Description and history ==
The Hominy Osage Roundhouse is part of the Hominy Indian Village located South and East of Hominy, Oklahoma next to a large community building and a huge dance arbor which are also part of the village. There are family homes surrounding the Osage dance grounds that include all three buildings.

The roundhouse is a symbol of Osage heritage. According to a press release from the Osage Nation:

"For many Osage people, especially Osages from the Hominy District, the circular building is a symbol of heritage, family, Osage culture and traditions. Despite centuries of oppression, disease, genocide and cultural loss, the Osage Nation is now a thriving sovereign Native Nation. The Hominy roundhouse was built nearly 100 years ago to strengthen the Osage people by helping to maintain Osage culture and community togetherness, and it did for a long time."

The roundhouse is located on 40 acres platted separately from the rest of Hominy, and is owned by the Osage Nation. The top of the roof is an opening which is covered with a small conical roof. The vent is used for ventilation, activated by opening the windows and doors. The peak is also used as a bell tower. The roundhouse is "a symbol of heritage, family, Osage culture and traditions".

It was added to the National Register of Historic Places on May 16, 1979.

== Repairs to the Roadhouse ==
In 2015 Osage Nation Principal Chief Geoffrey Standing Bear ordered emergency repairs to the Round House when the roof looked to be on the verge of collapse and asked members of the Osage Nation Congress for funding to restore the Round House. “This is the last standing [Osage] roundhouse,” said Standing Bear. “Our intent is to completely restore it, as it was, to the way the people who remember it used it for our dances.”

Osage Congresswoman Alice Buffalohead, who is also a Committee Cook for the Hominy District, said saving the roundhouse and making it safe and functional again was important and needed for cultural preservation. “I’m so happy this administration is taking the steps necessary to do this and to take care of this not only for the Hominy people but also for all Osage people."
