= Fairfax, Oklahoma =

- Town
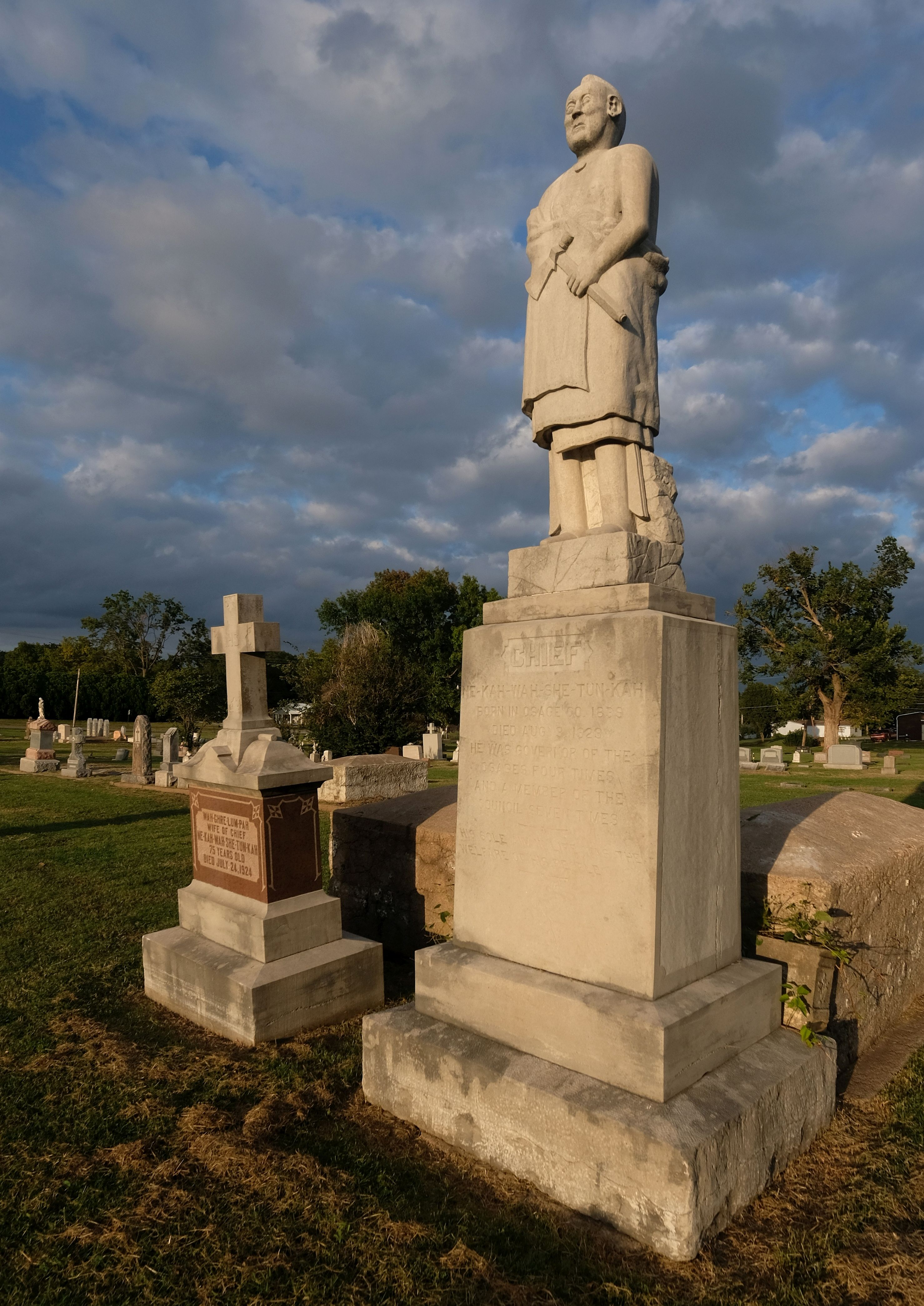
- Chief Ne-Kah-Wah-She-Tun-Kah Grave and Statue in Fairfax Cemetery is on the National Register of Historic Places listings in Osage County, Oklahoma

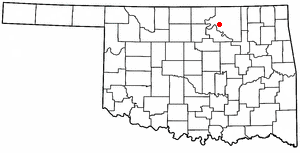
- Location of Fairfax, Oklahoma
- Coordinates: 36°34′11″N 96°42′29″W
- Country: United States
- State: Oklahoma
- County: Osage

Government
  - Mayor: Charlie Cartwright

Area
  - Total: 0.77 sq mi (1.99 km^{2})
  - Land: 0.76 sq mi (1.98 km^{2})
  - Water: 0.0039 sq mi (0.01 km^{2})
- Elevation: 886 ft (270 m)

Population (2020)
  - Total: 1,136
  - Density: 1,484/sq mi (572.8/km^{2})
- Time zone: UTC-6 (Central (CST))
  - Summer (DST): UTC-5 (CDT)
- ZIP code: 74637
- Area codes: 539/918
- FIPS code: 40-24850
- GNIS feature ID: 2412610

Fairfax is a town in Osage County, Oklahoma, United States. The Osage Nation reservation is coterminous with the county. As of the 2020 census, Fairfax had a population of 1,136. It was the home of the ballerinas Maria and Marjorie Tallchief.

== History ==
When the Santa Fe Railway chose to go up Salt Creek valley and bypassed the village of Gray Horse (which continues to exist today as the home of one of the Osage tribe's three major historic bands) the present day town of Fairfax was created. Local merchants, including Lew A. Wismeyer, moved buildings from Gray Horse and leased 40 acres (16 ha) acres for a townsite. Wismeyer rejected the name Coda proposed by the railroad and convinced them to call the depot Fairfax after a hotel he had stayed at in Washington, D.C. The Osage tribe retained title to the townsite until March 3, 1905, when Congress provided for the land to be sold at public auction, with the proceeds credited to the tribe. Fairfax had 470 residents at the time of statehood in 1907. Fairfax is also the site of the majority of the Osage Indian Murders that took place in the 1920s in Osage County, Oklahoma. The murders occurred following the discovery of oil on the Osage Nation Reservation (coterminous with the county). At least 24 Osages were murdered in a plot masterminded by William Hale.

== Geography ==
Fairfax is 28 miles (45 km) southwest of Pawhuska and 32 miles (51 km) southeast of Ponca City.

According to the United States Census Bureau, the town has a total area of 0.8 square miles (2.1 km^{2}), all land.

=== Climate ===
Climate data for Fairfax, Oklahoma
Month	Jan	Feb	Mar	Apr	May	Jun	Jul	Aug	Sep	Oct	Nov	Dec	Year
Mean daily maximum °F (°C)	46.6 (8.1)	52.4 (11.3)	62.9 (17.2)	73.8 (23.2)	80.8 (27.1)	88.4 (31.3)	94.4 (34.7)	93.6 (34.2)	85.2 (29.6)	75.3 (24.1)	61.2 (16.2)	49.6 (9.8)	72.0 (22.2)
Mean daily minimum °F (°C)	22.6 (−5.2)	27.5 (−2.5)	37.1 (2.8)	47.9 (8.8)	56.7 (13.7)	65.3 (18.5)	69.3 (20.7)	67.5 (19.7)	60.2 (15.7)	47.8 (8.8)	36.9 (2.7)	26.2 (−3.2)	47.1 (8.4)
Average precipitation inches (mm)	1.2 (30)	1.6 (41)	3.1 (79)	3.2 (81)	4.8 (120)	4.2 (110)	2.9 (74)	3.3 (84)	4.7 (120)	2.9 (74)	2.5 (64)	1.6 (41)	35.8 (910)
Source 1: weather.com
Source 2: Weatherbase.com

== Demographics ==
Historical population
Census	Pop.	Note	%±
1910	819		—
1920	1,342		63.9%
1930	2,134		59.0%
1940	2,327		9.0%
1950	2,017		−13.3%
1960	2,076		2.9%
1970	1,889		−9.0%
1980	1,949		3.2%
1990	1,749		−10.3%
2000	1,555		−11.1%
2010	1,380		−11.3%
2020	1,136		−17.7%
U.S. Decennial Census

=== 2020 census ===
As of the 2020 census, Fairfax had a population of 1,136. The median age was 41.9 years. 23.2% of residents were under the age of 18 and 22.4% of residents were 65 years of age or older. For every 100 females there were 88.7 males, and for every 100 females age 18 and over there were 85.0 males age 18 and over.

0.0% of residents lived in urban areas, while 100.0% lived in rural areas.

There were 492 households in Fairfax, of which 26.2% had children under the age of 18 living in them. Of all households, 32.5% were married-couple households, 22.2% were households with a male householder and no spouse or partner present, and 35.2% were households with a female householder and no spouse or partner present. About 37.6% of all households were made up of individuals and 17.5% had someone living alone who was 65 years of age or older.

There were 599 housing units, of which 17.9% were vacant. The homeowner vacancy rate was 2.2% and the rental vacancy rate was 4.4%.

Racial composition as of the 2020 census
Race	Number	Percent
White	637	56.1%
Black or African American	9	0.8%
American Indian and Alaska Native	314	27.6%
Asian	2	0.2%
Native Hawaiian and Other Pacific Islander	1	0.1%
Some other race	11	1.0%
Two or more races	162	14.3%
Hispanic or Latino (of any race)	45	4.0%

=== 2000 census ===
As of the census of 2000, there were 1,555 people, 657 households, and 417 families residing in the town. The population density was 1,947.2 inhabitants per square mile (751.8/km^{2}). There were 831 housing units at an average density of 1,040.6 per square mile (401.8/km^{2}). The racial makeup of the town was 67.65% White, 1.35% African American, 24.12% Native American, 0.19% Asian, 0.45% from other races, and 6.24% from two or more races. Hispanic or Latino of any race were 1.48% of the population.

There were 657 households, out of which 30.3% had children under the age of 18 living with them, 43.4% were married couples living together, 15.8% had a female householder with no husband present, and 36.4% were non-families. 33.5% of all households were made up of individuals, and 17.8% had someone living alone who was 65 years of age or older. The average household size was 2.31 and the average family size was 2.92.

In the town, the population was spread out, with 27.6% under the age of 18, 7.0% from 18 to 24, 22.6% from 25 to 44, 21.0% from 45 to 64, and 21.8% who were 65 years of age or older. The median age was 40 years. For every 100 females, there were 83.8 males. For every 100 females age 18 and over, there were 78.2 males.

The median income for a household in the town was $21,652, and the median income for a family was $25,385. Males had a median income of $26,518 versus $21,250 for females. The per capita income for the town was $12,765. About 23.9% of families and 28.0% of the population were below the poverty line, including 38.8% of those under age 18 and 21.7% of those age 65 or over.

== Economy ==
The town economy has relied on agriculture and oil production. The population of Fairfax reached a high of 2,327 at the 1940 census, but began to decline as the production of oil dropped in the area, and farm populations decreased with increased mechanization. It fell to 1,869 by 1970, briefly rose to 1,949 in 1980, dropped again to 1,555 in 2000 and yet again to 1,380 in 2010 .

== Education ==
The area is served by Woodland Public Schools, formed in 1990 when the Fairfax school district merged with the Ralston district.

== Notable people ==
- Maria Tallchief, professional ballerina
- Marjorie Tallchief, professional ballerina
- Larry Coker, high school and college football coach

== In popular culture ==
David Grann wrote Killers of the Flower Moon, a book about the Osage Indian murders and the FBI’s involvement in solving them. Portions of the movie based on the book were filmed here.

A documentary about Fairfax Hospital titled Country Doctor was released in 2025 by HBO Max. The documentary portrays the plight of rural hospitals in the United States, many of which are closing.
