= Marland Filling Station =

- U.S. National Register of Historic Places
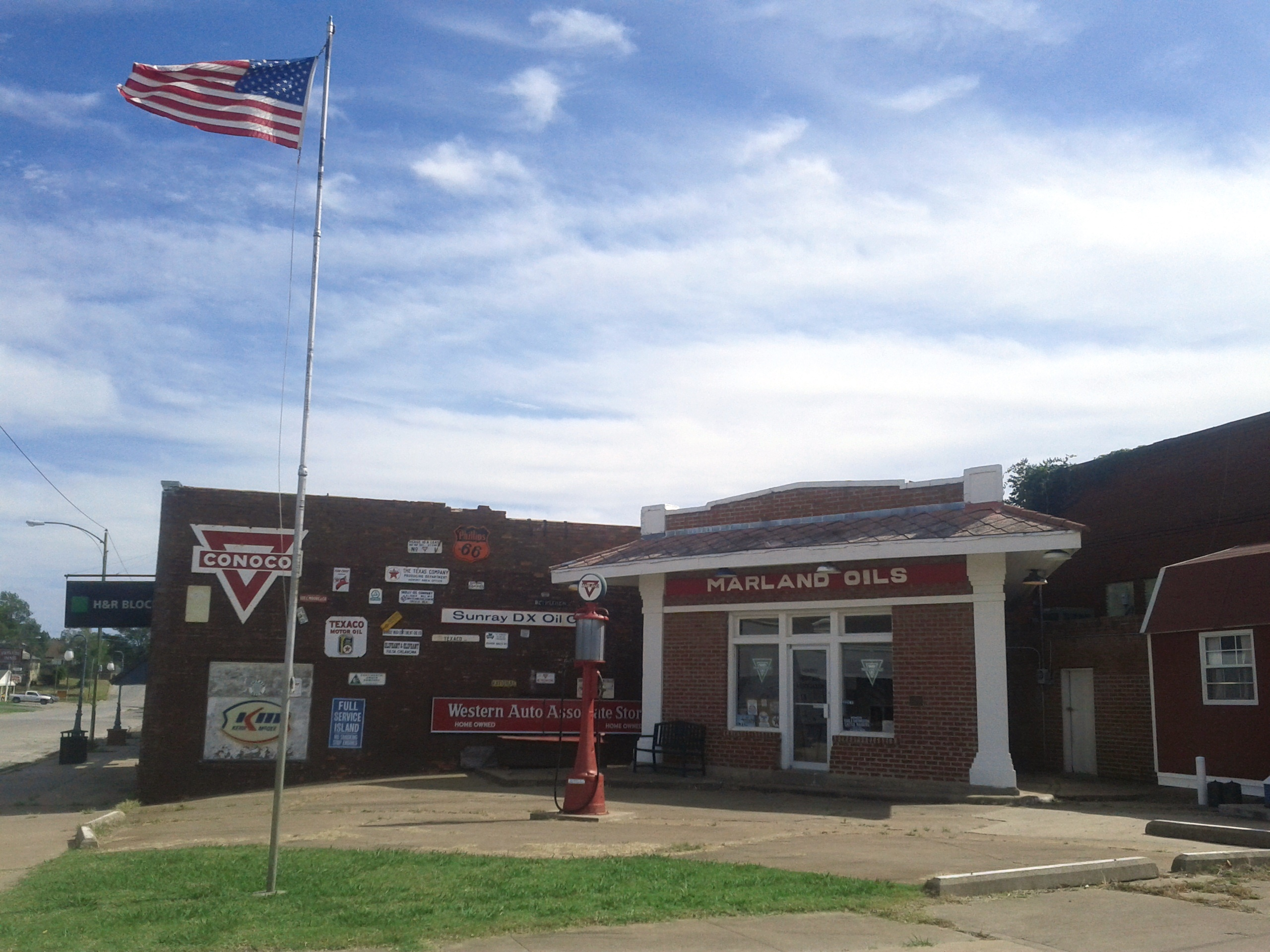
- Location: 102 South Wood, Hominy, Oklahoma
- Coordinates: 36°24′55″N 96°23′31″W
- Area: less than one acre
- Built: 1922
- Architect: Marland Oil Company
- Architectural style: Classical Revival
- NRHP reference No.: 02000970
- Added to NRHP: September 14, 2002

The Marland Filling Station at 102 South Wood in Hominy, Oklahoma was built in 1922. It was listed on the National Register of Historic Places in 2002.

It was designed by the Marland Oil Company. It is a small triangular red brick building with three 24 feet (7.3 m) sides.

The NRHP nomination explained its importance:

The distinctive, triangular building was a pioneer in Hominy - the first gas station constructed with the idea of associating a building with a particular product. As a standardized design, the Marland Filling Station represents a new wave in corporate advertising that utilizes the look of the building to create an identity with consumers. It is also reflective of the growth in importance of the automobile to this Osage County town.
