= Avant, Oklahoma =

- Town
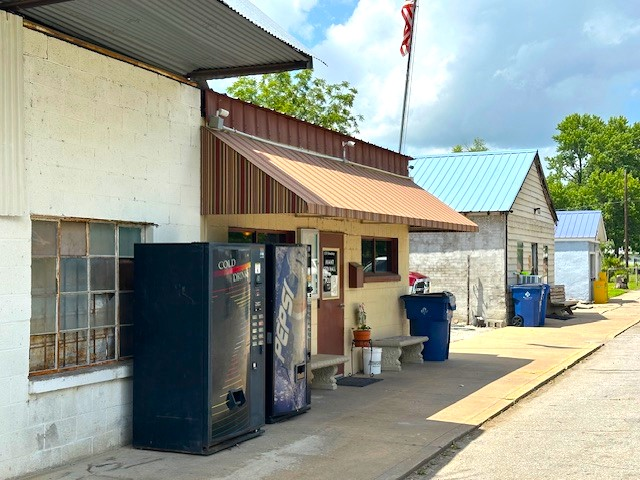
- Avant City Hall & Downtown

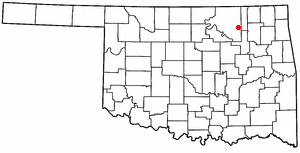
- Location of Avant, Oklahoma
- Coordinates: 36°29′32″N 96°02′40″W
- Country: United States
- State: Oklahoma
- County: Osage

Area
  - Total: 1.10 sq mi (2.86 km^{2})
  - Land: 1.04 sq mi (2.69 km^{2})
  - Water: 0.066 sq mi (0.17 km^{2})
- Elevation: 676 ft (206 m)

Population (2020)
  - Total: 301
  - Density: 289.4/sq mi (111.72/km^{2})
- Time zone: UTC-6 (Central (CST))
  - Summer (DST): UTC-5 (CDT)
- ZIP Code: 74001
- Area codes: 539/918
- FIPS code: 40-03500
- GNIS feature ID: 2411654

Avant is an incorporated community in eastern Osage County, Oklahoma, United States. As of the 2020 census, the community had 301 residents.

== History ==
Ben Avant, a native of Gonzales, Texas, married Rosalie Rogers, a Cherokee-Osage, and established a ranch in 1896. The Avant oil field was discovered in 1904. The Midland Valley Railroad (later acquired by the Missouri Pacific Railroad) reached the Avant ranch in 1905. A post office named Avant was established in 1906, but the town did not really begin to develop until 1909. Avant's population peaked at 1,071 in 1920, but declined steadily thereafter. Ben Avant was shot and killed by the town marshal in 1923.

The post office in Avant was slated for possible closure by the US Postal service in 2012, but the postal service website still shows the Avant post office is open as of July 2025.

== Geography ==
Avant is 26 miles (42 km) southeast of Pawhuska and 30 miles (48 km) north of Tulsa. Avant lies along Bird Creek. Birch Lake is to the west-northwest, while Skiatook Lake is to the southwest.

According to the United States Census Bureau, the town has a total area of 0.3 square miles (0.78 km^{2}; 190 acres), all land.

== Demographics ==
Historical population
Census	Pop.	Note	%±
1920	1,071		—
1930	696		−35.0%
1940	501		−28.0%
1950	389		−22.4%
1960	381		−2.1%
1970	439		15.2%
1980	461		5.0%
1990	369		−20.0%
2000	372		0.8%
2010	320		−14.0%
2020	301		−5.9%
U.S. Decennial Census

=== 2020 census ===
As of the 2020 census, Avant had a population of 301. The median age was 38.8 years. 20.9% of residents were under the age of 18 and 16.9% of residents were 65 years of age or older. For every 100 females there were 89.3 males, and for every 100 females age 18 and over there were 93.5 males age 18 and over.

0.0% of residents lived in urban areas, while 100.0% lived in rural areas.

There were 111 households in Avant, of which 28.8% had children under the age of 18 living in them. Of all households, 53.2% were married-couple households, 17.1% were households with a male householder and no spouse or partner present, and 20.7% were households with a female householder and no spouse or partner present. About 25.2% of all households were made up of individuals and 10.8% had someone living alone who was 65 years of age or older.

There were 130 housing units, of which 14.6% were vacant. The homeowner vacancy rate was 0.0% and the rental vacancy rate was 0.0%.

Racial composition as of the 2020 census
Race	Number	Percent
White	236	78.4%
Black or African American	0	0.0%
American Indian and Alaska Native	42	14.0%
Asian	0	0.0%
Native Hawaiian and Other Pacific Islander	0	0.0%
Some other race	1	0.3%
Two or more races	22	7.3%
Hispanic or Latino (of any race)	3	1.0%

=== 2010 census ===
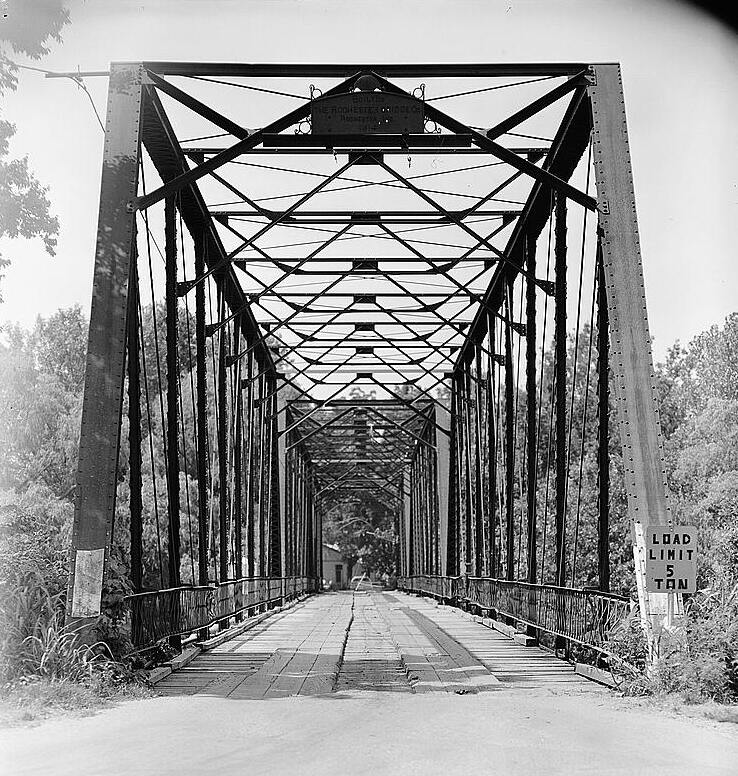
Bridge over Bird Creek in Avant

As of the census of 2010, there were 320 people living in the town. The population density was 1,050.9 inhabitants per square mile (405.8/km^{2}). There were 164 housing units at an average density of 463.3 per square mile (178.9/km^{2}). The racial makeup of the town was 70.43% White, 0.27% African American, 13.71% Native American, 0.27% Asian, 0.54% from other races, and 14.78% from two or more races. Hispanic or Latino of any race were 3.49% of the population.

There were 143 households, out of which 35.7% had children under the age of 18 living with them, 53.1% were married couples living together, 8.4% had a female householder with no husband present, and 30.1% were non-families. 27.3% of all households were made up of individuals, and 9.8% had someone living alone who was 65 years of age or older. The average household size was 2.60 and the average family size was 3.18.

In the town, the population was spread out, with 29.3% under the age of 18, 10.8% from 18 to 24, 26.1% from 25 to 44, 23.1% from 45 to 64, and 10.8% who were 65 years of age or older. The median age was 35 years. For every 100 females, there were 111.4 males. For every 100 females age 18 and over, there were 113.8 males.

The median income for a household in the town was $31,979, and the median income for a family was $40,313. Males had a median income of $32,500 versus $16,250 for females. The per capita income for the town was $12,995. About 15.9% of families and 23.8% of the population were below the poverty line, including 38.7% of those under age 18 and 10.0% of those age 65 or over.

== Economy ==
The local economy has been supported by agriculture and oil production.

== Education ==
It is in the Avant Public School school district.

== Infrastructure ==
=== Transportation ===
Avant is just off the current Oklahoma State Highway 11, along a prior alignment of the road now known as Old Highway 11.

The Candy Lake Estate Airport is east of Avant.
