= Avant Independent School District =

School district in Oklahoma

Location
- Avant, Oklahoma United States

District information
- Type: Public

The Avant Independent School District is a school district based in Avant, Oklahoma United States. It contains a single school that serves Kindergarten-Grade 8.

== See also ==
List of school districts in Oklahoma
