= First National Bank and Masonic Lodge =

- U.S. National Register of Historic Places
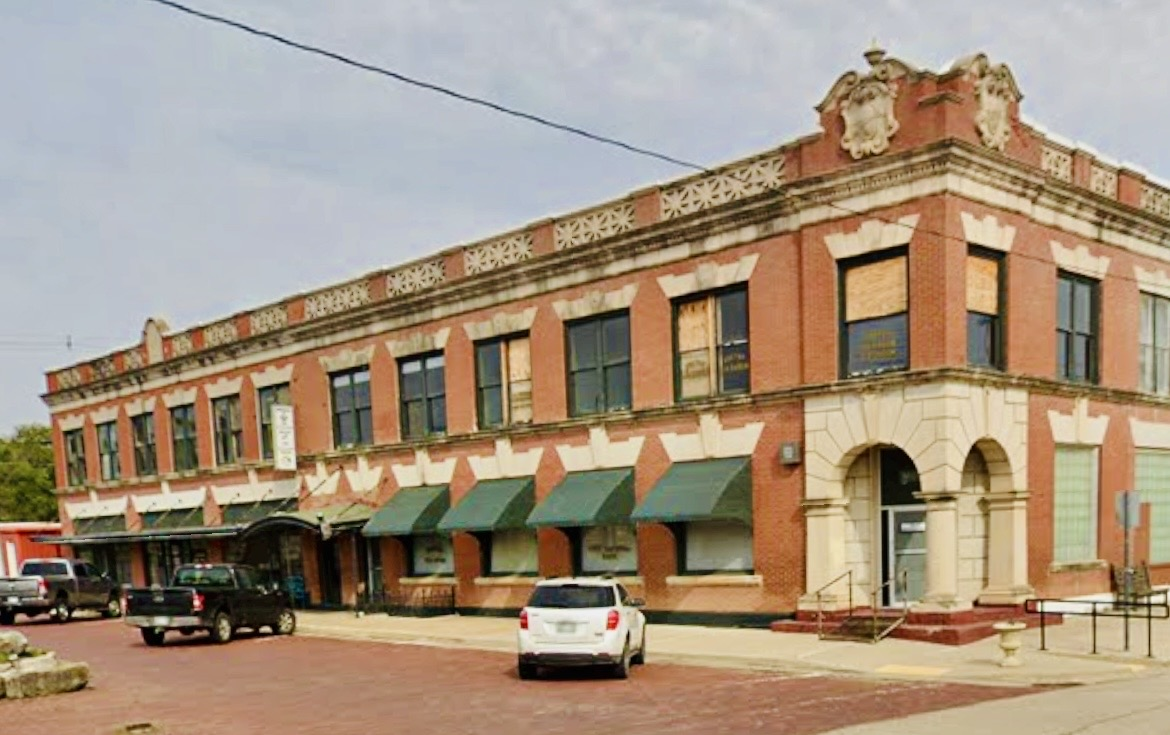

- Location within Oklahoma Location within the United States
- Location: 301 N. Main St. Fairfax, Oklahoma
- Coordinates: 36°34′15″N 96°42′16″W
- Area: less than one acre
- Built: 1906
- Architectural style: Colonial Revival, Georgian Revival
- NRHP reference No.: 84003393
- Added to NRHP: June 22, 1984

The First National Bank and Masonic Lodge is a historic building located in Fairfax, Oklahoma. The bank portion of the building was built in 1906. The lodge meeting hall portion was added by Greyhorse Lodge No. 124 in 1924. It was listed on the National Register of Historic Places in 1984. It is regarded as the best example of Georgian Revival architecture in Osage County.
