= Buckbrush =

Buckbrush is the common name for several species of North American shrubs that deer feed on, including but probably not limited to:

- Cephalanthus occidentalis
- Phyllanthopsis phyllanthoides, maidenbrush (south-central U.S.)
- Some western North American species of the genus Ceanothus, especially:
  - Ceanothus cuneatus
- Purshia tridentata and P. stansburiana (dry regions of western North America)
- Symphoricarpos orbiculatus, native to the eastern United States and Canada
