= Osage in Kansas =

Osage in Kansas describes the historical presence of Osage Native Americans in present-day Kansas on the Central Plains of the United States. The Osage are a Dhegiha Siouan–speaking Plains tribe, who are currently enrolled in the Osage Nation, a federally recognized tribe based in Oklahoma.

In the 18th century, the Osage lived mostly in Missouri but claimed lands and also resided in present-day Kansas and Oklahoma. The U.S. government forced them to cede the majority of their homelands and assigned them to an Indian reservation in southern Kansas, where they lived from 1825 to 1872. They suffered many hardships and a declining population due to starvation and disease. Beginning in the 1850s, white settlers overran their reservation and illegally squatted on their lands.

Under pressure from the U.S. government, the Osage sold their reservation land in Kansas and, with money from the sale, bought a new reservation in Indian Territory in the early 1870s. Their move was financially fortuitous because vast amounts of petroleum were discovered under their land in the early 20th century.

== Background ==
The Osage numbered around 17,000 in 1680, according to one estimate. They were centered near the Marais des Cygnes and Osage Rivers in west-central Missouri. Their influence reached over large portions of what became the states of Kansas, Oklahoma, and Arkansas. After 1800, under pressure from the expanding number of white settlers from the United States, thousands of Osage moved to three locations in Indian Territory: the "three forks" (which became Fort Gibson); Claremore) (named after an Osage chieftain); and near what became the town of Nowata. By 1815, numbering about 12,000, most Osage lived in Indian Territory. One subtribe of Osage, headed by Pawhuska or White Hair, settled on the Neosho River in Kansas.

Kansas in mid 19th century. The Osage Reservation is the rectangular area in southern Kansas pictured in green and yellow, reaching from present-day Independence to Dodge City. The blue-colored square to the east of the Osage reservation was purchased from the Osage by the U.S. in 1865.

== Losing land ==
The pressure of white settlement made the presence of the Osage unsustainable in Missouri. In 1808, the Osage ceded nearly all of their land in Missouri to the United States; in 1825, in another treaty they ceded most of their land in Kansas and all their land in Indian Territory. The 1825 treaty established an Osage reservation in southern Kansas, which ran 50 miles wide north to south and about 250 miles long east to west. A buffer zone on the east separated the Osage from white settlements. In payment for their land, they received 4,000 dollars in cash, 6,000 dollars in supplies, and the promise of the U.S. government of a payment of 7,000 annually for 20 years.

The Osage agreed to the 1825 treaty partially because they faced a challenge in Indian Territory from bands of Cherokee migrating west (also under white pressure) from the southern Appalachian mountains and resident in Arkansas. Several bands of Arkansas Cherokee, numbering 5,000 and well-armed and organized, were encroaching upon the Osage settlements and hunting on land the Osage considered theirs. The Osage removal to Kansas halted the warfare between the two tribes. The enactment by the U.S. of the Indian Removal Act in 1830 resulted in the former lands of the Osage in Indian Territory being allocated to the Cherokee who lived in both Arkansas and the southern Appalachians. The Cherokee were forced to migrate to Indian Territory.

Despite their travails of being bounced from place to place, the Osage inspired compliments from American travelers. In the 1830s, author Washington Irving called them "the finest looking Indians in the West." Painter George Catlin said they were the tallest race of people he had ever seen.

== Kansas reservation (1825-1872) ==
George Catlin's portrayal of Osage Indians.

The Osage, a regional power in the 18th century, suffered decades of decline during their residence on their reservation in southeastern Kansas. Burns estimated a decrease in their population from 12,000 in 1815 to 3,500 in 1860. Thousands died from the 1820s to the 1850s in epidemics of diseases of European origin which ravaged the tribe and contributed to the breakdown of its traditional customs and governance. The Osage endured frequent droughts and floods. Alcoholism became a problem. The reduction in their mobility by the boundaries of their reservation and the competition for hunting from other Indian tribes also contributed to their misery.

The 1850s brought new challenges for the Osage. In 1853, the U.S. Congress had authorized the President to secure the permission of the Indian tribes for white settlement on lands claimed by the Indians with "the purpose of extinguishing the title of said Indian tribes...to the land." In 1854, the Kansas-Nebraska Act adopted by Congress opened up Kansas to white settlement. The act ignored the fact that all of Kansas at the time had been allocated to Indian tribes by treaty and "not one acre of land was legally available to sell to settlers." As a result, Kansas experienced explosive population growth by white settlers and African-American slaves from 700 in 1854 to 107,000 in 1860.

Land-hungry white settlers took the government actions as a signal that the tenure of Indian tribes in Kansas would be short and began to encroach upon the reservations of many Indian tribes, including the Osage. The Osage reservation was the largest Indian reservation in Kansas and attracted the attention of farmers, railroad companies, businessmen, and politicians. Moreover, the Osage were split into factions which included persons of mixed Osage-white heritage whose objectives did not coincide with those of the traditional Osages. The settlers paid no attention to reservation boundaries and built homes and planted crops. During the American Civil War (1861-1865), the Osage were divided in their loyalties, but most were on the side of the north and in one battle killed more than 20 Confederate soldiers. Warring citizens and armies criss-crossed their land, burning homes and villages, and stealing Osage horses. Nearly 2,000 people from other Indian tribes fleeing Confederate control took refuge with the Osage. Indian help to the Union notwithstanding, the Kansas legislature passed a resolution in 1864 calling for the ownership of land by Indian tribes in Kansas to be extinguished.

=== 1865 treaty ===
At the end of the Civil War, the Osage were destitute, much of their land occupied by white settlers, the annuities from earlier land sales to the U.S. long expired, and the contribution of bison hunting to their livelihood diminished by decreasing numbers of bison and competition with other Plains Indians. In 1865, the U.S. and the Osage negotiated the Canville Treaty. To summarize the treaty, the Osage ceded about one half of their 12,500 sq mi (32,000 km^{2}) reservation to the United States. The Osage received in turn 300,000 dollars placed in a trust fund for which they were to be paid interest each year, plus the proceeds of land sales of their former lands by the U.S. government at a price of at least $1.25 per acre.

The treaty, however, did not result in reduced pressure by white settlers on the Osage's remaining lands, called the "Osage Diminished Reserve." In 1868, twelve to fifteen thousand white settlers lived illegally on the Diminished Reserve. The Osage made attempts to resist and expel the settlers. The Osage agent, Isaac T. Gibson, a Quaker, called out the U.S. Army to protect the Osage from the settlers, but not to remove the settlers from the land they were occupying. In the summer of 1870, while most of the Osage were hunting bison on their western frontier, the U.S. Congress passed legislation ordering the removal of the Osage from Kansas. The Osage accepted the U.S government dictate in September 1870. The proceeds from land sales allowed them to purchase a reservation in Indian Territory from the Cherokee for $1,099,137. Gibson thought the 70 cents per acre the Osage paid for their Indian Territory reservation was too high and should have been fifty cents an acre.

The total amount of money the Osage received from the sale of their Kansas lands was $8,825,000 after the cost of their Indian Territory reservation. This money was deposited in the U.S. Treasury and the Osage were paid 5 percent interest annually.

== Leaving Kansas ==
By 1872, the Osage had left Kansas. Their home was to be in "a rocky, presumably worthless reservation in northeastern Oklahoma." The Osage chose the land for their reservation because it was not attractive for farmers. They numbered an estimated 3,150. Ninety-two percent of them were full blood Osage; the remainder were mixed-bloods who decided to remain with the Osage.

As a condition of their removal to Indian Territory, the Osage insisted that the lands of their new reservation be held in common, rather than divided among tribal members. As they paid for the land with their own money, the Osage tribe had a fee simple title to the land on their Oklahoma reservation. This became important a few years later when, under the Dawes Act, the government broke up Indian reservations and distributed land to individual Indians or sold it to white settlers. Osage tribal ownership enabled the Osage to resist loss of land to whites and to maintain mineral rights on their property. Mineral rights became important in the 20th century when vast quantities of petroleum were discovered under Osage lands in Oklahoma.
