= Hominy Armory =

- U.S. National Register of Historic Places
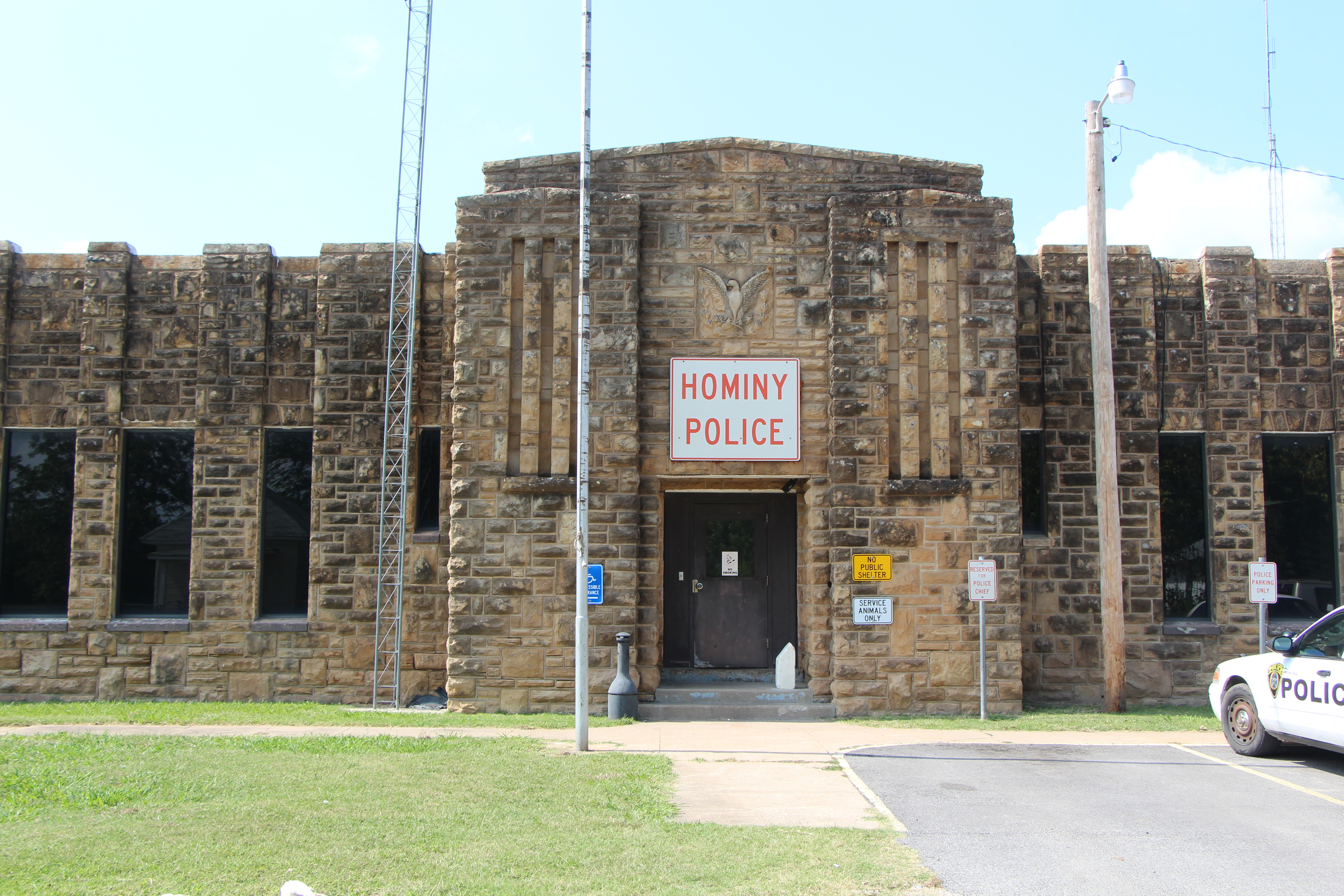
- Location: Osage County, Oklahoma
- Nearest city: Hominy, Oklahoma
- Coordinates: 36°25′1″N 96°23′43″W
- Built: 1937
- Architectural style: Works Progress Administration
- NRHP reference No.: 94000482
- Added to NRHP: May 20, 1994

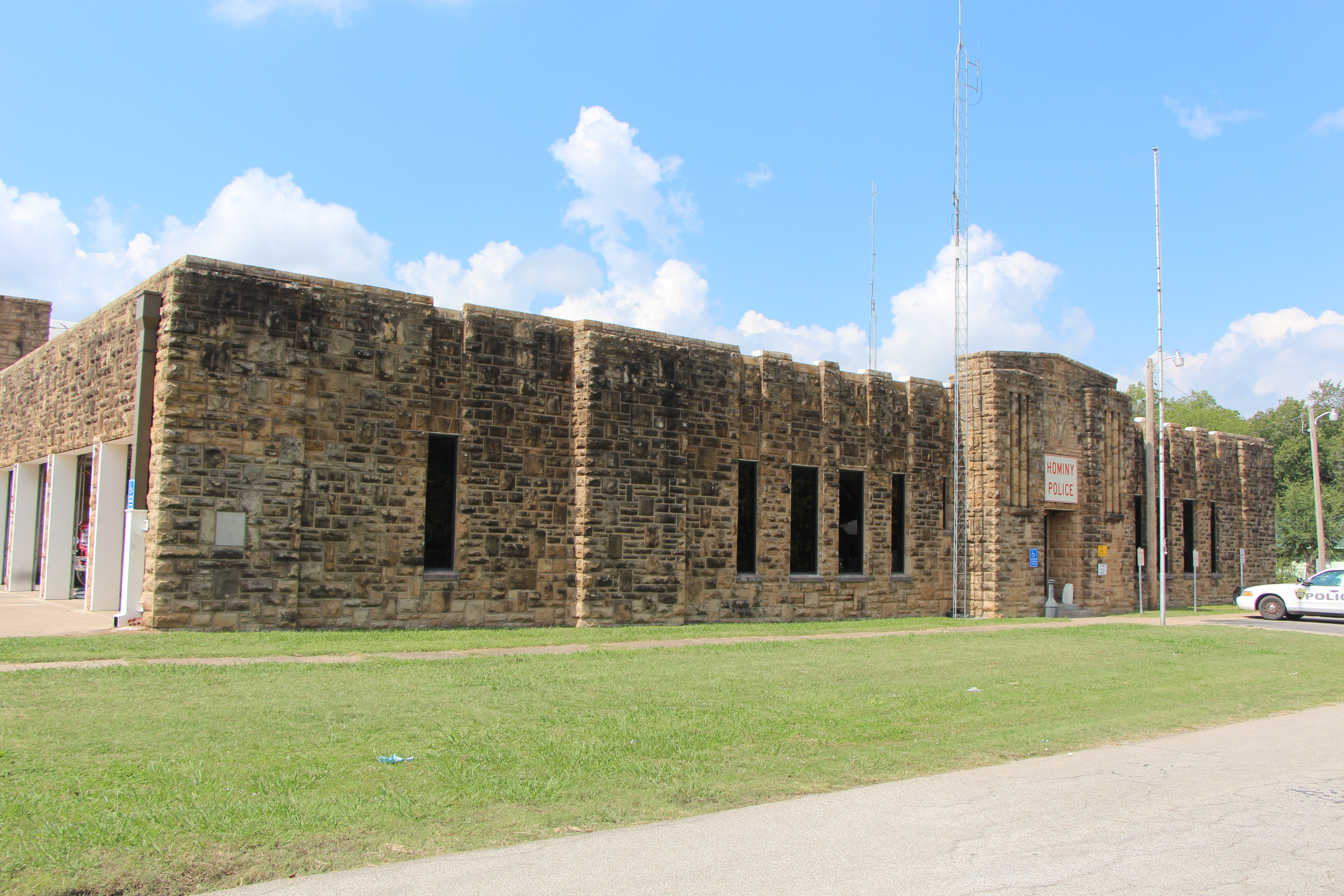
Hominy Armory, south east side

The Hominy Armory is a single story building measuring 257 feet x 141 feet. It was constructed between 1935 and 1937 by the Works Progress Administration. It originally housed the Hominy National Guard.

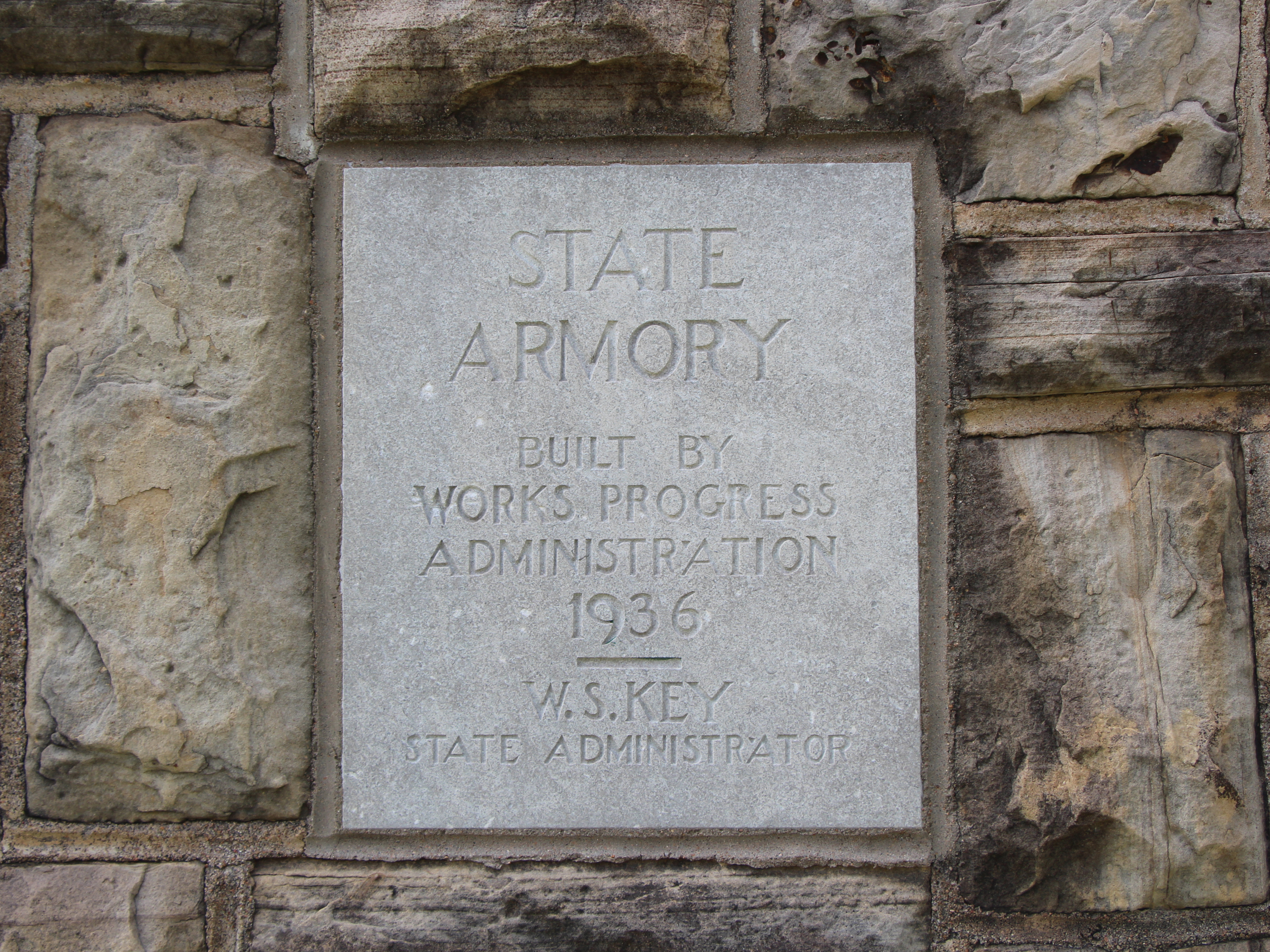
Hominy Armory
