= Immaculate Conception Church (Pawhuska, Oklahoma) =

Historic church in Oklahoma, United States

- U.S. National Register of Historic Places
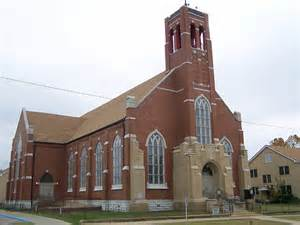

- Location within Oklahoma Location within the United States
- Location: 1314 Lynn Ave., Pawhuska, Oklahoma
- Coordinates: 36°40′17″N 96°19′53″W
- Area: less than one acre
- Built: 1910
- Architect: Bavarian Art Glass Co. of Munich; Father Edward
- NRHP reference No.: 79002015
- Added to NRHP: May 21, 1979

Immaculate Conception Church is a historic Roman Catholic church building at 1314 Lynn Avenue in Pawhuska, Oklahoma. It was built in 1910 and added to the National Register in 1979.

It is a red brick cruciform church building which is significant mostly for its unusual stained glass windows designed by the Bavarian Art Glass Company of Munich, given dispensation to be placed in the church by special permission of the pope.

One of the two largest shows Columbus arriving in the New World and being met by Indians. The other shows the arrival of Father Shoemaker to meet the Osage tribe in Kansas, before the tribe was moved to the Indian Territory (now Oklahoma).

The church and its stained glass windows were planned by Father Edward Van Waesberghe, who also directly helped in its construction.

The "Bavarian Art Glass Co. of Munich" mentioned may be what is otherwise known as the Royal Bavarian Stained Glass Manufactory, in Munich, Germany, or the Royal Bavarian Stained Glass Manufactory, Munich or the Franz Mayer & Co.
