= Hominy Public Schools =

School district in Oklahoma, United States

Hominy Public Schools is a public school district headquartered in Hominy, Oklahoma.

The district, in Osage County, includes Hominy. It includes parts of the Osage Reservation.

== History ==
In 2001 the Office of Bilingual Education and Minority Languages Affairs of the United States Department of Education gave a five year grant to the district for bilingual programs. The district used the Osage language as its bilingual language; the usage of Osage in the county was the main factor in why the Osage County Interlocal Cooperative's evaluator and grant writer chose that language as the district's bilingual language.

== Schools ==
- Hominy High School
  - As of 2022 the school has Osage language as a class for world languages. Additionally, as of 2023, a teacher used the book Killers of the Flower Moon to teach about Osage history, and the students were scheduled to watch the film version.
- Hominy Middle School
- Hominy Elementary School
- Hominy Early Childhood Center
- Hominy Alternative Academy
