= Hominy School =

- U.S. National Register of Historic Places
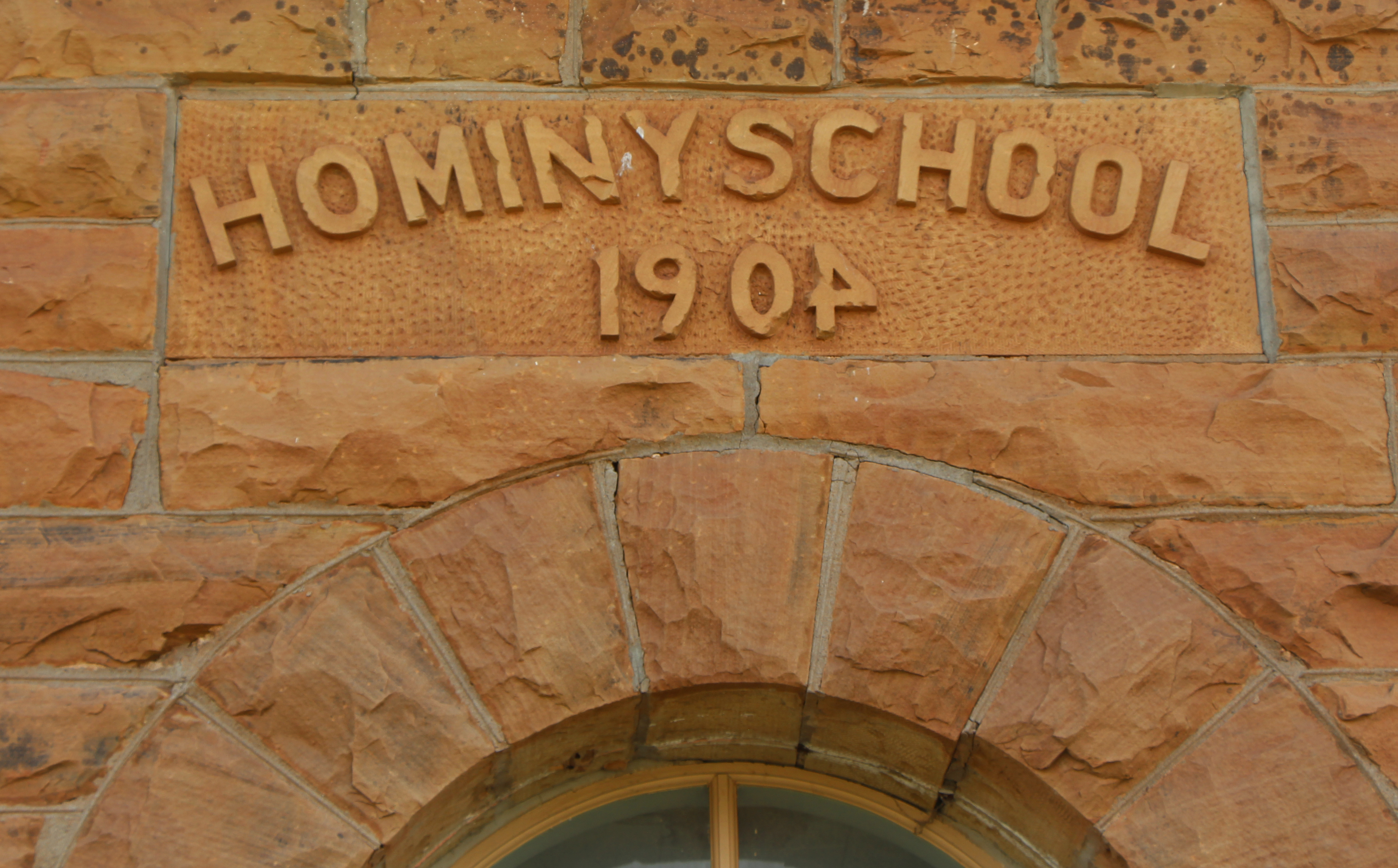
- Location: Osage County
- Nearest city: Hominy, Oklahoma
- Coordinates: 36°24′50″N 96°23′26″W
- Area: less than one acre
- Built: 1904
- NRHP reference No.: 88001183
- Added to NRHP: August 12, 1988

The Hominy School, constructed in 1904, is 50 feet x 40 feet, and 20 feet high. The bell tower was removed in the 1940s, but replaced in 1980 with the original bell. It was the first and oldest school in Hominy.

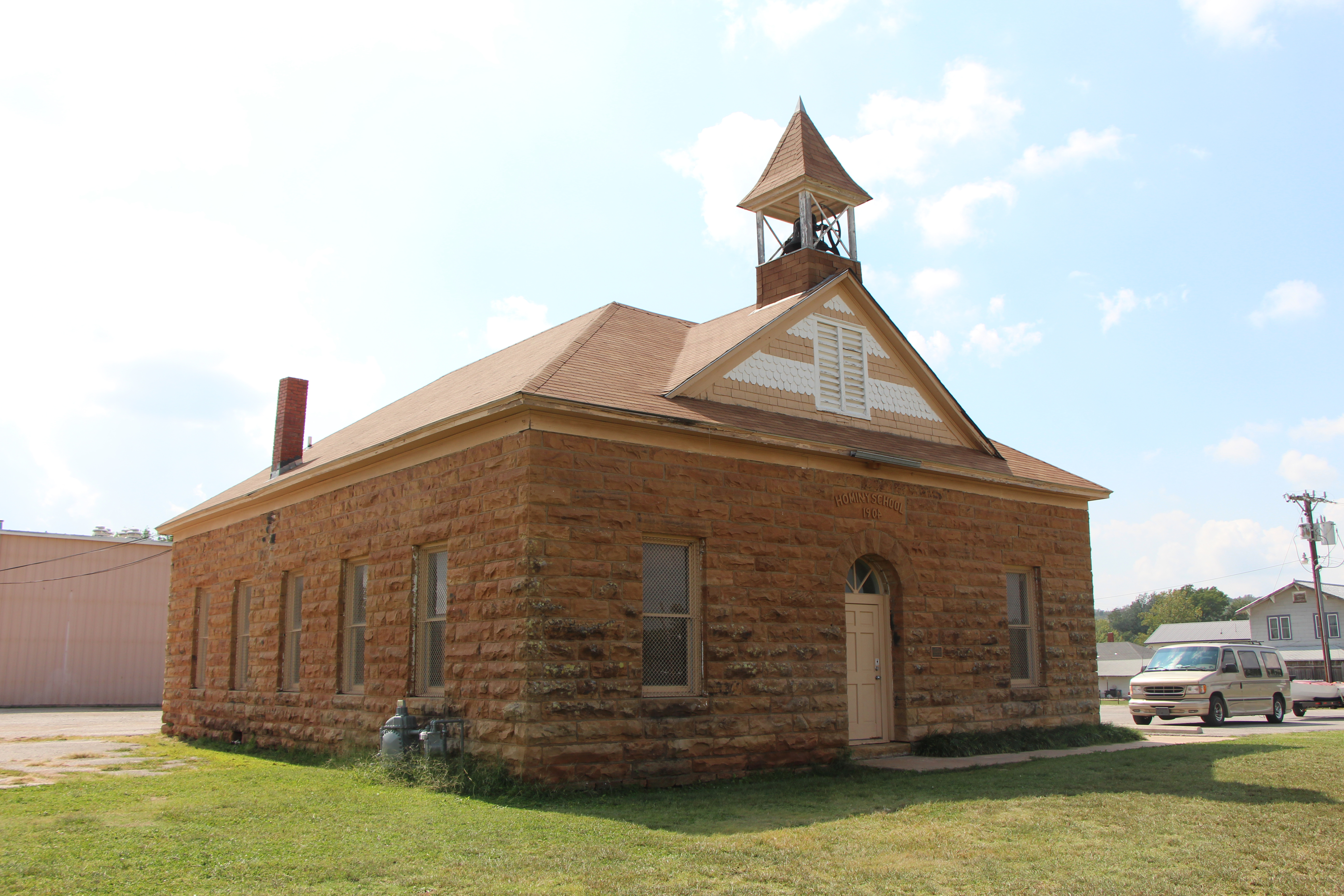
Hominy School
