= Conservation and restoration of leather objects =

The conservation and restoration of leather objects is the process of determining the causes of deterioration, followed by deciding the best course of action for preserving the leather objects for the future.

== Properties of leather ==
Leather is a highly sought-after material due to its resistance to tearing, flexing, and puncture. It is also an effective insulator of heat, as it prevents the passage of airflow. In order for skins to be turned into leather, they must go through a process known as tanning to stabilize the collagen for the duration of the manufacture. When describing a material as leather, this includes the animal pelts, as well as all of the materials used in the manufacturing process. Knowledge of these materials is essential when deciding upon proper conservation and preservation techniques.

=== Manufacture of leather ===
During the Prehistoric era, humans discovered that animals could be used for purposes besides food. Their skin could be adapted into clothing and shelter. The first use of animal skins is attributed to Australopithecus habilis, who is recorded to have roamed East Africa two million years ago and possessed a diet with significant meat consumption. Artifacts from this time indicate the use of a chipped stone for cutting through thick hides. The bones found at the sites of Australopithecine settlements suggest that the joints of larger animals were butchered with this tool and their pelts were brought to human dwelling places for multiple uses. Evidence from the hominid Pithecanthropoid shows the use of a coup-de-point tool for butchering and skinning animals. Their pelts were then used to create large tent shelters by spreading the pelts over wooden frameworks. For additional protection, skins were also believed to have been placed along the sides of shelters in rough bundles. The skins used in these structures were believed to have been warmed by a fire, which created a curing effect by drying the skins slowly. It is suggested that special skinning and scraping tools were created after witnessing this natural progression of the skins, which spread fats across the hide. This million-year-old process is considered by some to be the beginning of leather creation.

Evidence from around 120,000 years ago suggests that humans made leather clothing out of jackal, fox, and wildcat skins. During the Neolithic era, humans began domesticating animals, such as goats and cattle. The skins of these animals became popular for use in leather production.

In the Medieval era, tanning was considered a skilled trade and leather was second to wool as a textile fabric. During this period, a tanner would wash hides free of blood, manure, and other curing materials before it was rehydrated. To accomplish this task, the tanner would submerge the hide in a nearby river or stream. Other methods involved trampling on the hides with feet or pounding the material with hammers. Upon completion, the hides were then placed with the hair side up, in order to remove the hair without damaging the surface. To loosen the hair, it was common to let the pelt become putrid or douse the pelt with liquors such as stale beer, fermented barley, fermented mulberry, dung, or bryony leaves. Soaking the skins in liquor prepared with wood ash or lime would produce a similar effect. When the skin was deemed adequately prepared, it would be stretched over a beam and scraped. The hair side would be scraped with a blunt, single-edged unhairing knife and the flesh with a sharper, two-edged fleshing knife. The next step would be an additional soak and scraping. The skin would then be washed again and alkaline bating would be applied to remove excess lime and create a softer, finer grain. After repeating this step, the skin would be laid over the beam once more to remove any of the waste products that were released in this process, often referred to as slime. After the skin was considered cleaned and prepared, it was ready for the tanning process. This was done by placing the skin in a pit on top of ground tanning material and covered by additional ground tanning material. This process would be repeated until the pit was nearly full. Tanning materials were dependent on the local landscape and were mostly composed of tree matter (oak, birch, willow, spruce, etc.). Upon filling the pit, it would then be filled with cold water and the skins were left to sit for close to a year. When the tanner judged that the leather was sufficiently tanned, the skins were removed, rinsed, and smoothed with a knife before being slowly dried in a dark space. At that point, the leather was dried and sold to a currier for additional processing.

== Agents of deterioration ==
=== Water ===
Acid hydrolysis is the breakage of bonds by hydronium ions. Hydronium ions are contained within the liquid form of water and cause the breakage of bonds within ionic structures. When an acid is dissolved in water it separates the hydrogen ion from the other ions of the acid and the hydrogen reacts with the water molecules to form the hydronium ions causing the aforementioned hydrolysis. With the presence of an acid in this reaction this process is known as acid hydrolysis. The most common agent of acid hydrolysis found in historical leathers is attributed to sulfuric acid, which is absorbed from industrial pollution as sulfur dioxide. In the presence of sunlight, the sulfur dioxide is converted into sulfur trioxide and then absorbed by the tannins in the leather. The trioxide is then hydrated into sulfuric acid, dissolving in the present moisture of the leather creating the hydronium ions. It is then from these hydronium ions that internal links are broken among the leather molecules. Breakdowns include a reduction in bonds between amino acids and collagen, and additional breakdown may occur from the tannins and acids inherently present in the leather which may increase the risks and severity of acid hydrolysis. Heat, moisture and a low pH are also contributing factors in this process.

=== Light ===
Oxidation is the loss of an electron among leather, most often attributed to oxygen as the oxidizing agent or molecule of electron loss. Oxidation may also occur due to the effects of light and heat.

Metals that act as catalysts of oxidation are the greatest concern in leather deterioration. Iron is the most common contaminant found in the manufacture of leather and can act as a catalyst for oxidation and eventually lead to the breakdown of molecules by hydrolysis.

=== Incorrect temperature ===
Heat is the transference of kinetic energy to the leather. When this occurs, the internal molecules of the leather increase in speed and begin colliding with one another at a rate so fast that the bonds of the leather molecules are no longer capable of remaining intact and thus break. The effect of heat is most often associated with long-term exposure and rapid fluctuations in temperature on the leather. When exposed to heat in either condition, the leather may lose the ability to absorb water from the air and the result is a hard or brittle state, this is referred to as hysteresis. This is due to the interconnected nature of external heat and moisture content in leather. Water: see the above relationship of heat and moisture content in leather

=== Incorrect relative humidity ===
When kept at a humidity level of about 70% combined with an excess of oil and lubricants, mold can form on the surface of the leather. If the humidity is at a level of about 40% with a fluctuation of temperature, cracks can occur along the surface.

=== Pollutants ===
Red rot is the degradation of leather when it reacts with sulfur dioxide or other air pollutants. Objects affected by red rot go through several stages. In the early stages of red rot, leather will exhibit a pinkish color that becomes progressively darker as the decay progresses. The degradation and disintegration of red rot cannot be reversed. In order to preserve the object in this altered state the two most significant steps for preservation are to store the object in a controlled air environment and to place where minimal handling will occur.

== Principles of care, storage, and display ==
To ensure the longevity of leather objects, the following steps should be followed:

=== Display and storage ===
The main concern for the preservation of an object, outside of its physical composition, is storage. Storage space should be prepared to ensure the object is kept in a stable condition, with aesthetic concern at a lower priority. The handler of the object should be aware of the conditions for display and storage, as well as the object's physical state. The relative humidity of any storage location should be monitored and kept below 65% to prevent mold growth as well keeping good circulation and temperature. Conservators focus their efforts on identifying the proper methods for the storage and display of leather objects, to ensure that any changes are reversible and cause no direct physical harm to the object.

=== Levels of treatment ===
The first principle in determining treatment is to ensure that all conservation is reversible, appropriate, and the least invasive possible. It should be the intent of the conservation to place the object in a stable condition with the least amount of future deterioration. The simplest form of this process can be found in moving an object to a more stable environment. An example of a minor concern would stabilizing loose sections of leather or a flaking surface of the material. Several solutions could be utilized from the application of surface finishes or inpainting of damage. Careful consideration should be given to ensure the selected method is the best conservation practice. On the more severe side of the spectrum of conservation is full restoration. This would mean that most if not all of the leather covering of an object would need to be replaced. The context in which an object is to be displayed is an important factor in determining what degree of repairs should take place. A used workman's pouch or bag would not require a new condition look as it would alter the object's interpretation, dependent on location and history.

=== Handling ===
The degree of handling and access will play a large role in the decisions of care and treatment, as well as display locations. If an object is in a position that is highly susceptible to touching or handling by the public, it should either be moved away to a newer location away from open display or staff should be prepared for the object's frequent repair or eventual replacement. In most cases, if an object's condition is to a point where it may be lost forever due to continued exposure, it should be properly stored away in the correct environment and have as minimal future handling as possible.

=== Finish ===
A finish or dressing is often applied for aesthetic reasons, rather than conservation. When a dressing is applied, it may brighten an object and give a new sheen to the leather without contributing to the preservation of the object. However, in some instances, this may lead to conservation problems. Therefore, any applied finishes should be carefully considered and studied before placing them on an object for conservation. Dressing or finishes may absorb dirt creating a tacky surface. Some contain inappropriate ingredients. Over application may lead to spewing, which is the rise of white deposits of free fatty acids on the leather surface, often mistaken for mold. Dressings should never be applied to painted leather of any kind. The oils and fats can permanently discolor and soften the varnishes. Application of this kind may not happen immediately and should not lead to a belief that it will be successful in the following months or years. Previous removals of over-varnish utilized the same materials as the original varnish, which led to the stripping of the entire varnish coat. In modern leather preservation, the original surface coating may be stripped completely off to provide a uniform replacement finish. This method is not advised for historical pieces, but is appropriate for reproductions and modern leather works, as they may prolong the life of the material without compromising the historical value or integrity.

== Conservation and restoration treatments ==
There are a number of techniques used to conserve and restore leathers.

- Consolidation – Consolidation is an option for leather that has suffered extensive degradation and the leather surface needs to be reestablished to create a firm surface for repairs and/or cleaning. Common materials used include Paraloid B67 in white spirit, Klucel G, Pliantex (no longer commercially produced, SC6000, Lascaux wax-resin, and gelatin.
- Dry cleaning – Removal of dust, which may cause tiny abrasions, should be done by using a brush vacuum. If more extensive dry cleaning is necessary brushes or sponges may be used. Brushes should be used with care as they may cause similar abrasive issues.
- Humidification – is the process of adding the appropriate level of humidity to the leather, without wetting, in an effort to reshape and/or restore the object to its desired condition. During humidification special care should be taken to ensure that the object never reaches a wet state. Temperature should be monitored closely to ensure there is not a rapid change in temperature, which can contribute to the shrinkage of leather and cause damage. Since damaged leather may be more sensitive to heat, objects should not place near windows that can expose them to heat. Due to its susceptibility to mold, leather should be regularly monitored during this process. Heat treatments should always be avoided while leather is in the humidification process.
- Molding – is the process of adding a fill to the spot in the leather to return it to its original state. A common fill known as Beva 371 can be painted on the leather to match the tone of the original.
- Proprietary leather cleaners – Commercially produced cleaners are commonplace with leather care, but can have negative effects if not closely researched or used by those unfamiliar with the ingredients.
- Wet cleaning and solvent cleaning – The primary purpose of any wet cleaning on leather is to remove surface soiling. Leather should not be soaked in water. Soaking the leather can cause additional issues to arise, such as distortion, discoloration, hardening, movement of salts and tannins, and tidemarks. Using cotton swabs with common solutions is a safe and regular practice in cleaning leather. Common solutions used are mixtures of water with ammonia, white spirit, alcohol, or detergents. White spirit or mineral spirits is also a suitable solution for wet cleaning. Dependent on the material and its construction, any mixture used should be prepared with caution and at the appropriate ratio.

== Conservation and restoration materials ==
There are a number of very specific materials that are used in the conservation and restoration of leather.

- Aluminum alkoxide – 1% in white spirit, used as a chemical restabilizing retanning agent for red rot leather.
- Bavon ASAK ABP – leather lubricating compound. An alkenyl succinic acid derivative that is soluble in white spirits and Genklene
- Bavon ASAK 520S
- Bedacryl 1225
- Beva 371
- British Museum leather dressing or Pliantine
- Sodium Carboxymethyl cellulose or CMC
- Connolly's Leather Food – a dressing for hide upholstery, leather goods, and clothing
- DDT – now banned
- p-dichlorobenzene – mothball
- Disinfectant 1473 – used as a fungicide
- Dowicide A – water-soluble fungicide made of sodium salt of orth-phenyl phenol
- Draftclean
- Ethylene glycol
- Ethylene-vinyl acetate
- Facteka A – granular cleaner for suede or leather with abraded surfaces. Rubber-like and made from rapeseed oil.
- French chalk or talc
- Fuller's earth
- Gelatin
- Genklene – non-flammable (1,1,1-trichloroethane)
- Glue
- Invasol S – Synthetic anionic oil
- Isopropanol or Isopropyl alcohol
- Japanese tissue paper
- Lanolin anhydrous
- Lipoderm Liquor SA
- Lipoderm Liquor LPK – synthetic anionic oil free of natural fat
- Lissapol N. – non-ionic detergent
- Magnesium carbonate
- microcrystalline wax
- Neutralfat SSS – stabilized olein soap which on drying loses emulsifying property so that it no longer promotes the absorption of water
- New leather
- Paraloid B-72
- Plexisol – consolidant for leather affected by red rot. Polyacrylate resin preparation containing 25% solids. Must be diluted with Genklene.
- Pliancreme – a cream form of British Museum leather dressing, emulsified with water, containing a fungicide.
- Pliantex – same as Plexisol (see above)
- Polyester sailcloth
- Polyvinyl acetate
- Preventol L – fungicide; sodium salt of chlorinated phenol
- Opodeldoc recipe,
- PEG 400 or polyethylene glycol
- Renaissance Wax
- Rubber cement
- Saddle soap -
- Santobrite -fungicide for leather, Pentachlorophenol
- Silicon leather wax
- Soluble nylon
- Spun-bonded polyester fabrics
- Tannic acid
- Thymol
- Vulpex – potassium oleate soap, soluble in water or white spirit
- Wheatpaste
- White spirit BS245
- Woven textile
