= Pershing, Oklahoma =

- Census-designated place
- Location within Oklahoma Location within the United States
- Coordinates: 36°35′24″N 96°16′23″W
- Country: United States
- State: Oklahoma
- County: Osage

Area
  - Total: 0.54 sq mi (1.40 km^{2})
  - Land: 0.54 sq mi (1.40 km^{2})
  - Water: 0 sq mi (0.00 km^{2})
- Elevation: 899 ft (274 m)

Population (2020)
  - Total: 42
  - Density: 77.7/sq mi (29.99/km^{2})
- Time zone: UTC-6 (Central (CST))
  - Summer (DST): UTC-5 (CDT)
- ZIP Code: 74002 (Barnsdall)
- Area codes: 918/539
- FIPS code: 40-58300
- GNIS feature ID: 2812865

Pershing is an unincorporated community and census-designated place (CDP) in Osage County, Oklahoma, United States. It was first listed as a CDP prior to the 2020 census. As of the 2020 census, Pershing had a population of 42.

The CDP is in eastern Osage County, on the south side of Oklahoma State Highway 11, which leads east and south 8 miles (13 km) to Barnsdall and 40 miles (64 km) to the outskirts of Tulsa. In the other direction, Highway 11 leads west and north 8 miles (13 km) to Pawhuska, the Osage county seat.

== Demographics ==
Historical population
Census	Pop.	Note	%±
2020	42		—
U.S. Decennial Census

=== 2020 census ===
As of the 2020 census, Pershing had a population of 42. The median age was 53.5 years. 14.3% of residents were under the age of 18 and 35.7% of residents were 65 years of age or older. For every 100 females there were 121.1 males, and for every 100 females age 18 and over there were 125.0 males age 18 and over.

0.0% of residents lived in urban areas, while 100.0% lived in rural areas.

There were 22 households in Pershing, of which 45.5% had children under the age of 18 living in them. Of all households, 59.1% were married-couple households, 18.2% were households with a male householder and no spouse or partner present, and 9.1% were households with a female householder and no spouse or partner present. About 9.1% of all households were made up of individuals and 4.5% had someone living alone who was 65 years of age or older.

There were 22 housing units, of which 0.0% were vacant. The homeowner vacancy rate was 0.0% and the rental vacancy rate was 0.0%.

Racial composition as of the 2020 census
Race	Number	Percent
White	24	57.1%
Black or African American	0	0.0%
American Indian and Alaska Native	11	26.2%
Asian	0	0.0%
Native Hawaiian and Other Pacific Islander	0	0.0%
Some other race	0	0.0%
Two or more races	7	16.7%
Hispanic or Latino (of any race)	0	0.0%

== Education ==
Most of the CDP is in Barnsdall Public Schools, while a part of the CDP is in Pawhuska Public Schools.
