= Barnsdall Independent School District =

School district in Oklahoma

Location
- Barnsdall, Oklahoma United States

District information
- Type: Public

The Barnsdall Independent School District, also known as Barnsdall Public Schools (BPS), is a school district based in Barnsdall, Oklahoma United States. It includes Barnsdall Elementary School and Barnsdall High School.

It includes Barnsdall and most of Pershing census-designated place.

The district contains 435 students across the three schools.

== History ==
Jeff Lay was superintendent from circa 2017, until 2022.

== See also ==
- List of school districts in Oklahoma
