= Bank of Hominy =

- U.S. National Register of Historic Places
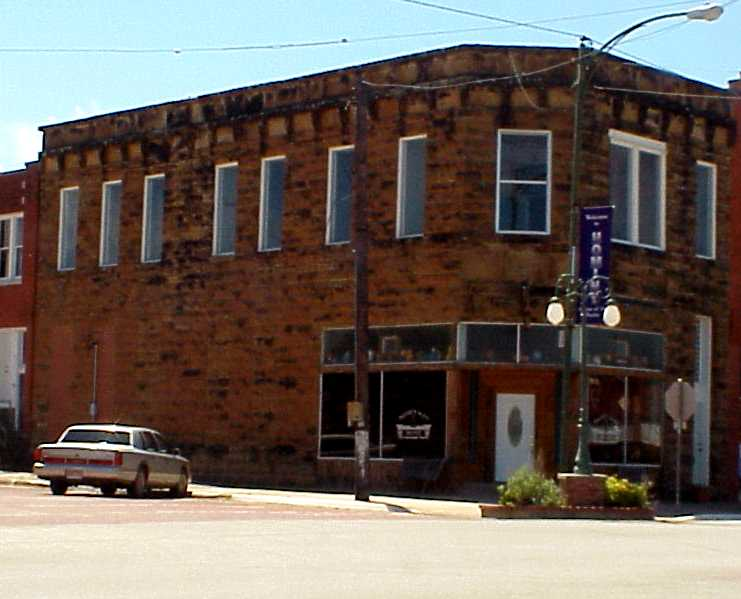

- Location within Oklahoma Location within the United States
- Location: 102 W. Main St., Hominy, Oklahoma
- Coordinates: 36.41536°N 96.39435°W
- Built: 1906
- Architectural style: Romanesque Revival
- MPS: Richardsonian Romanesque Banks of Osage County TR
- NRHP reference No.: 84000316
- Added to NRHP: November 23, 1984

The Bank of Hominy, at W. Main St. and S. Price Ave. in Hominy, Oklahoma, is a building constructed in 1906, two years after the Oklahoma oil boom of 1904. It is one of four small bank buildings built in Richardsonian Romanesque style in Osage County, Oklahoma during 1904–1911. The others are Bank of Burbank, Bank of Bigheart, and Osage Bank of Fairfax.

The building is constructed of native sandstone and has two stories. Its footprint is approximately 25 feet (7.6 m) by 40 feet (12 m). It has a flat roof and a 2 feet (0.61 m) high parapet. A masonry inscription on the facade between the first and second floors reads, "The Bank of Hominy." Except for the installation of two large display windows on the ground floor, architectural changes since construction have been minimal.

The Bank of Hominy was the only bank in town until it ceased doing business in 1938, during the Great Depression. The building is historically significant because it is the oldest bank building in Hominy and one of the best examples of its architectural style applied to a commercial structure in Osage County, Oklahoma. When the bank closed, Clyde M. Frazier bought the building and turned the ground floor into an auto parts store, which it remained until at least 1984. Until 1984 the second floor had always been used only as office space for professionals. The structure was listed on the National Register of Historic Places in 1984.

In 2023, the front of the building was, per Google Streetview and Google satellite view, blocked off and under some renovation, with the appearance that at least window replacements were underway.
