= Barnsdall High School =

Location
- 200 S. 8th Street; Barnsdall, Oklahoma 74002; United States
- Coordinates: 36.560247°N 96.166613°W

Information
- School type: Public, secondary
- School district: Barnsdall Independent School District
- CEEB code: 370260
- Principal: Sayra Bryant
- Teaching staff: 8.17 (FTE)
- Grades: 9-12
- Enrollment: 150 (2023-2024)
- Average class size: 30 Students
- Student to teacher ratio: 18.36
- Colors: Cardinal and silver
- Athletics: OSSAA 1A
- Mascot: Panther
- Yearbook: Echo
- Website: Barnsdall Jr/Sr High School

Barnsdall High School is a secondary school in Barnsdall, Oklahoma. It belongs to the Barnsdall Independent School District.

== Curriculum ==
Barnsdall High School offers a comprehensive secondary curriculum. As of January 2010, the school began following a four-day school week. Barnsdall was the second district in Osage County to adopt the shortened week as a money-saving measure.

== Extracurricular activities ==
The school's athletic teams, known as the Barnsdall Panthers, compete in Oklahoma Secondary School Activities Association size classification A or 1A. Teams are fielded in basketball, football, softball, and wrestling. Athletic director Joe Gilbert has been a coach at the school for over 50 years.

State championship titles held by the school include:

- Baseball: 1980
- Slow Pitch Softball: 2013

== Notable alumni ==
- Thomas F. Hall, Assistant Secretary of Defense for Reserve Affairs
