= Bank of Bigheart =

- U.S. National Register of Historic Places
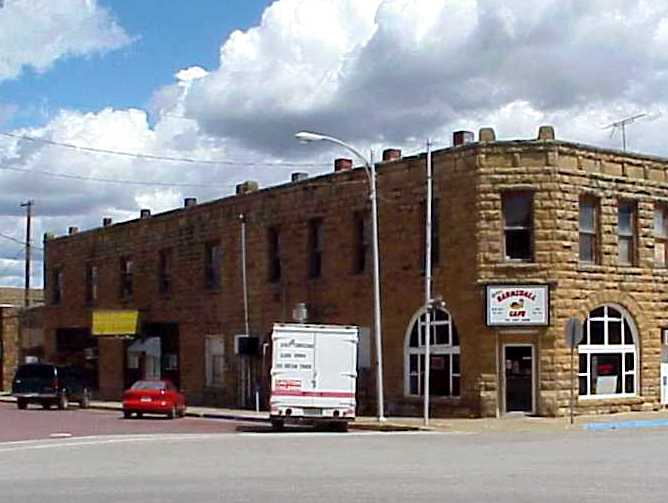
- Bank of Bigheart building, in 2007

- Location within Oklahoma Location within the United States
- Location: 308 W. Main St., Barnsdall, Oklahoma
- Coordinates: 36.56197°N 96.16167°W
- Built: 1911
- Architectural style: Richardsonian Romanesque
- MPS: Richardsonian Romanesque Banks of Osage County TR
- NRHP reference No.: 84000311
- Added to NRHP: November 23, 1984

The Bank of Bigheart was a bank based in Barnsdall, Oklahoma and is also the name of its surviving historic commercial building, at 308 W. Main St. in Barnsdall.

It is one of four small bank buildings built in Richardsonian Romanesque style in Osage County, Oklahoma during 1904–1911, the peak of the county's oil boom. The others are Bank of Hominy, Bank of Burbank, and Osage Bank of Fairfax.

The Bank of Bigheart was founded in what was then the town of Bigheart, Oklahoma, and was renamed to Barnsdall in 1922. The building, constructed in 1911, served the bank until the bank closed in the 1930s, amidst the Great Depression. It was listed on the National Register of Historic Places in 1984.

When listed, it was the oldest surviving commercial building in Barnsdall.

== Construction ==
The building is a two-story commercial building built of native sandstone with a coursed ashlar finish, about 25 by 70 feet (7.6 m × 21.3 m) in plan. It has a flat roof surrounded by an approximately 3 feet (0.91 m) tall parapet on all sides except the rear.

The building is an example of late Richardsonian Romanesque architecture. It is built of native sandstone. The lower level features large arched windows typical of Richardsonian Romanesque buildings. The upper story has a smaller deeply set window with straight tops which are arranged in ribbon-like fashion, while the roofline features crenelations, both of which are characteristic of Richardsonian Romanesque.

== Operating history ==
The first floor of the building originally contained the Bank of Bigheart.

The bank was renamed the Barnsdall State Bank in 1925. which remained in the building until 1976, when it relocated to the present-day American Heritage Bank building. It has since contained a variety of businesses including a drug store and tavern. The second floor was originally used for professional offices and continued to do so at least through the 1980s, but has been vacant since then.

According to the Bigheart Times, other tenants in the building have included the town of Barnsdall, which used it as a city hall and as a library, International Order of Oddfellows (IOOF) and its auxiliary (the Rebekahs). The ground floor currently has two retail tenants: a flower shop called Twig and Berries, and The Hen House, which sells handcrafted items, as well as fresh eggs. In 2014, Cliff Taylor, then owner of the building, began a renovation program by replacing all of the windows on the second floor.

== Listing ==
It was deemed significant for listing on the National Register as "it is the oldest surviving commercial building in Bigheart (now Barnsdall)" and it is "among the four oldest banks in Osage County", and "it is one of the finest representations of Richardsonian Romanesque architecture as applied to a commercial building in Osage County."

The bank is located on the northwest corner of W. Main St. and 5th St. in Barnsdale, on Oklahoma State Highway 11. It is adjoined on its east side by another two-story commercial building on W. Main. In 2023, the building appears occupied but not in retail commercial use, as there is no visible signage.

In 2023, Barnsdall is served by at least one bank, the American Heritage Bank, on the east end of the same block, at 400 W. Main St.
