= Bank of Burbank =

- U.S. National Register of Historic Places
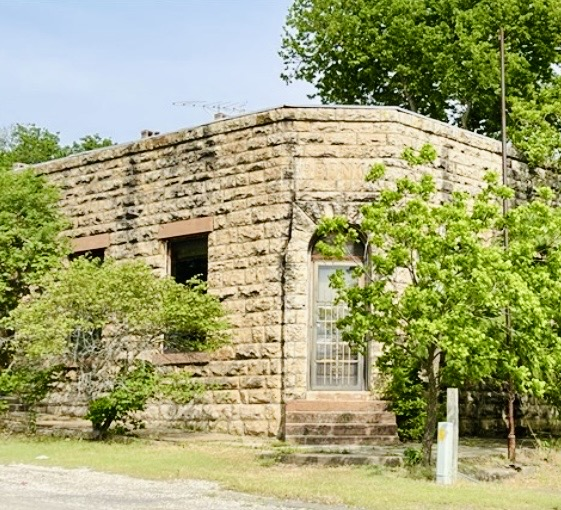

- Location within Oklahoma Location within the United States
- Location: McCorkle and 1st Sts. Burbank, Oklahoma
- Coordinates: 36.69808°N 96.72672°W
- Built: 1910
- Architectural style: Richardsonian Romanesque
- MPS: Richardsonian Romanesque Banks of Osage County TR
- NRHP reference No.: 84000314
- Added to NRHP: November 23, 1984

The Bank of Burbank was a bank in Burbank, Oklahoma, and its historic bank building survives. The building was built in 1910. The bank operated through the Great Depression and continued in business until 1948 when the bank ceased operating. The building was used for 30 years as the Burbank post office, and subsequently was renovated for use as a private residence. It was listed on the National Register of Historic Places in 1984.

The building is a single-story small commercial building, built of native sandstone and having a coursed ashlar finish. It is about 15 by 25 feet (4.6 m × 7.6 m) in plan. It has a flat roof with a parapet of 3 feet (0.91 m) surrounding all sides but the rear.

It is one of four small bank buildings built in Richardsonian Romanesque style in Osage County, Oklahoma, during 1904–1911. The others are Bank of Hominy, Bank of Bigheart, and Osage Bank of Fairfax.

The building stands alone, with no adjoining buildings, on the northwest corner of First St. and McCorkle St. in Burbank.
