= Lake Waxhoma =

Lake in Oklahoma, United States

Coordinates: 36°33′28″N 96°06′36″W

Lake Waxhoma is located in Osage County, Oklahoma, about 4 miles east of the city of Barnsdall (but within the city limits), to which it supplies water. It is about 128 acres in size, with a shoreline length of about 3.6 miles, and a maximum depth of about 40 feet. It feeds into Dog Thrasher Creek, which then feeds into Bird Creek and eventually the Verdigris River near Catoosa. The lake has a boat ramp, and its most popular fishing species include Largemouth bass, American gizzard shad, and Blue catfish.

A 10-by-20-foot hole under the concrete spillway near the top of the Lake Waxhoma Dam developed in 2021, and crews used rocks to create a temporary patch. The spillway was then earmarked in 2022 for $1.6 million in federal funding for permanent repairs. However, no repair had been done by late April of 2025 when heavy rainfall broke the patch open. Flooding occurred along Bird Creek, and sections of both State Highway 11 and State Highway 20 had to be closed.
