= Polyethylene glycol =

Chemical compound

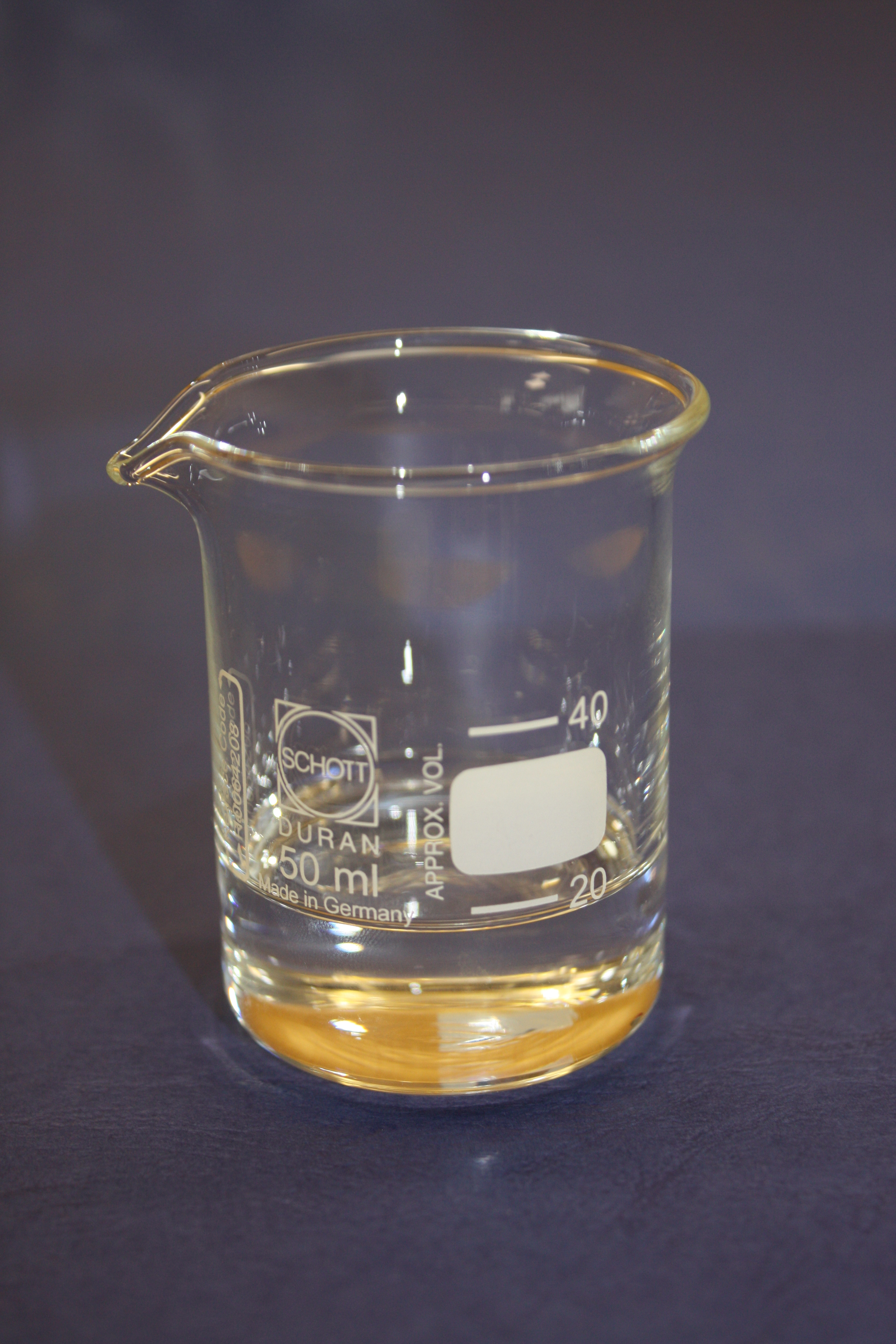
- Polyethylene glycol 400

Names
- IUPAC names poly(oxyethylene) {structure-based}, poly(ethylene oxide) {source-based}
- Other names Kollisolv, Carbowax, GoLYTELY, GlycoLax, Fortrans, TriLyte, Colyte, Halflytely, macrogol, MiraLAX, MoviPrep

Identifiers
CAS Number	25322-68-3
Abbreviations	PEG
ChEMBL	ChEMBL1201478
ChemSpider	none
ECHA InfoCard	100.105.546
E number	E1521 (additional chemicals)
UNII	3WJQ0SDW1A
CompTox Dashboard (EPA)	DTXSID4027862

Properties
Chemical formula	C_{2n}H_{4n+2}O_{n+1}
Molar mass	44.05n + 18.02 g/mol
Density	1.125

Pharmacology
ATC code	A06AD15 (WHO)

Hazards
Flash point	182–287 °C; 360–549 °F; 455–560 K
- Except where otherwise noted, data are given for materials in their standard state (at 25 °C [77 °F], 100 kPa). verify (what is ?) Infobox references

Polyethylene glycol (PEG; /ˌpɒliˈɛθəlˌiːn ˈɡlaɪˌkɒl, -ˈɛθɪl-, -ˌkɔːl/) is a polyether compound derived from petroleum with many applications, from industrial manufacturing to medicine. PEG is also known as polyethylene oxide (PEO) or polyoxyethylene (POE), depending on its molecular weight. The structure of PEG is commonly expressed as H−(O−CH_{2}−CH_{2})_{n}−OH.

PEG is commonly incorporated into hydrogels which present a functional form for further use.

== Uses ==
=== Medical ===
- Pharmaceutical-grade PEG is used as an excipient in many pharmaceutical products, in oral, topical, and parenteral dosage forms.
- PEG is the basis of a number of laxatives (as MiraLax, RestoraLAX, MoviPrep, etc.). Macrogol (with brand names such as Laxido, Movicol and Miralax) is the generic name for polyethylene glycol used as a laxative. The name may be followed by a number that represents the average molecular weight (e.g. macrogol 3350, macrogol 4000, or macrogol 6000). Whole bowel irrigation with polyethylene glycol and added electrolytes is used for bowel preparation before surgery or colonoscopy or for children with constipation.
- The possibility that PEG could be used to fuse axons is being explored by researchers studying peripheral nerve and spinal cord injury.
- An example of PEG hydrogels (see Biological uses section) in a therapeutic has been theorized by Ma et al. They propose using the hydrogel to address periodontitis (gum disease) by encapsulating stem cells in the gel that promote healing in the gums. The gel with encapsulated stem cells was to be injected into the site of disease and crosslinked to create the microenvironment required for the stem cells to function.
- PEGylation of adenoviruses for gene therapy can help prevent adverse reactions due to pre-existing adenovirus immunity.
- A PEGylated lipid is used as an excipient in both the Moderna and Pfizer–BioNTech vaccines for SARS-CoV-2. Both RNA vaccines consist of messenger RNA, or mRNA, encased in a bubble of oily molecules called lipids. Proprietary lipid technology is used for each. In both vaccines, the bubbles are coated with a stabilizing molecule of polyethylene glycol. PEG could trigger allergic reaction, and allergic reactions are the driver for both the United Kingdom and Canadian regulators to issue an advisory, noting that: two "individuals in the U.K. ... were treated and have recovered" from anaphylactic shock. The US CDC stated that in their jurisdiction six cases of "severe allergic reaction" had been recorded from more than 250,000 vaccinations, and of those six only one person had a "history of vaccination reactions".

=== Chemical ===
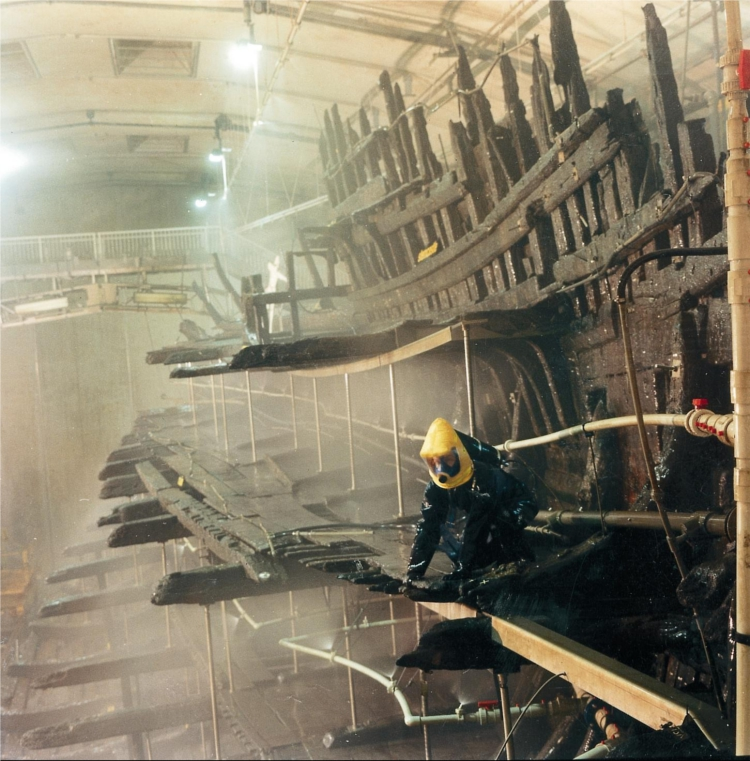
The remains of the 16th century carrack Mary Rose undergoing conservation treatment with PEG in the 1980s

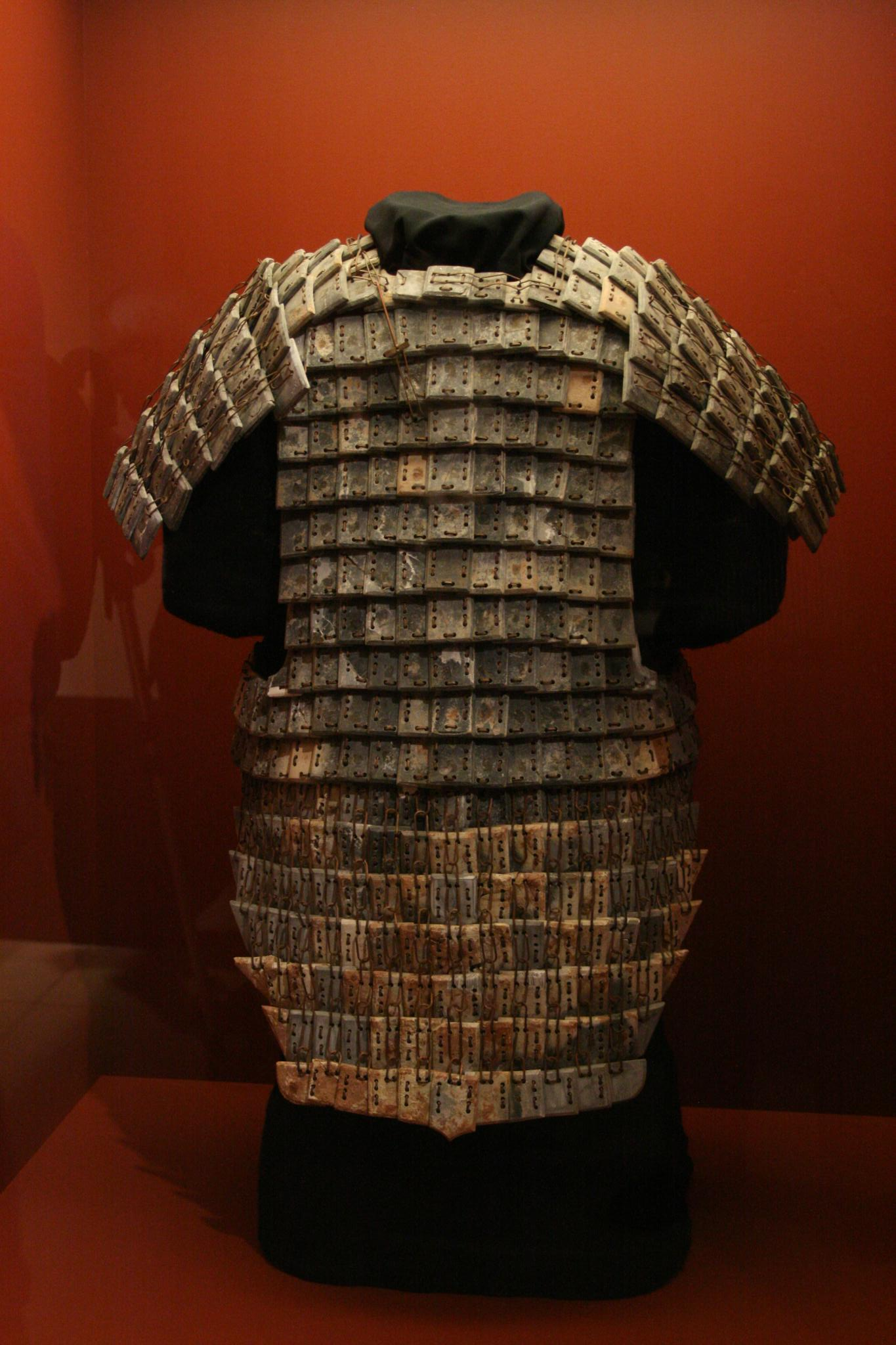
Terra cotta warrior, showing traces of original color

- Polyethylene glycol can serve as a green reaction medium in a variety of organic reactions.
- Polyethylene glycol is also commonly used as a polar stationary phase for gas chromatography, as well as a heat transfer fluid in electronic testers.
- PEG is frequently used to preserve waterlogged wood and other organic artifacts that have been salvaged from underwater archaeological contexts, as was the case with the warship Vasa in Stockholm, and similar cases. It replaces water in wooden objects, making the wood dimensionally stable and preventing the warping or shrinking of the wood when it dries. In addition, PEG is used when working with green wood as a stabilizer, and to prevent shrinkage.
- PEG has been used to preserve the painted colors on Terracotta Warriors unearthed at a UNESCO World Heritage site in China. These painted artifacts were created during the Qin Shi Huang (first emperor of China) era. Within 15 seconds of the terra-cotta pieces being unearthed during excavations, the lacquer beneath the paint begins to curl after being exposed to the dry Xi'an air. The paint would subsequently flake off in about four minutes. The German Bavarian State Conservation Office developed a PEG preservative that when immediately applied to unearthed artifacts has aided in preserving the colors painted on the pieces of clay soldiers.
- PEG is often used (as an internal calibration compound) in mass spectrometry experiments, with its characteristic fragmentation pattern allowing accurate and reproducible tuning.
- PEG derivatives, such as narrow range ethoxylates, are used as surfactants.
- PEG has been used as the hydrophilic block of amphiphilic block copolymers used to create some polymersomes.
- PEG is a component of the propellent used in UGM-133M Trident II Missiles, in service with the United States Navy.
- PEG has been used as a solvent for aryl thioether synthesis.

=== Biological ===
- An example study was done using PEG-diacrylate hydrogels to recreate vascular environments with the encapsulation of endothelial cells and macrophages. This model furthered vascular disease modeling and isolated macrophage phenotype's effect on blood vessels.
- PEG is commonly used as a crowding agent in in vitro assays to mimic highly crowded cellular conditions. Although polyethylene glycol is considered biologically inert, it can form non-covalent complexes with monovalent cations such as Na^{+}, K^{+}, Rb^{+}, and Cs^{+}, affecting equilibrium constants of biochemical reactions.
- PEG is commonly used as a precipitant for plasmid DNA isolation and protein crystallization. X-ray diffraction of protein crystals can reveal the atomic structure of the proteins.
- PEG is used to fuse two different types of cells, most often B-cells and myelomas to create hybridomas. César Milstein and Georges J. F. Köhler originated this technique, which they used for antibody production, winning a Nobel Prize in Physiology or Medicine in 1984.
- In microbiology, PEG precipitation is used to concentrate viruses. PEG is also used to induce complete fusion (mixing of both inner and outer leaflets) in liposomes reconstituted in vitro.
- Gene therapy vectors (such as viruses) can be PEG-coated to shield them from inactivation by the immune system and to de-target them from organs where they may build up and have a toxic effect. The size of the PEG polymer is important, with larger polymers achieving the best immune protection.
- PEG is a component of stable nucleic acid lipid particles (SNALPs) used to package siRNA for use in vivo.
- In blood banking, PEG is used as a potentiator to enhance detection of antigens and antibodies.
- When working with phenol in a laboratory situation, PEG 300 can be used on phenol skin burns to deactivate any residual phenol.
- In biophysics, polyethylene glycols are the molecules of choice for the functioning ion channel diameter studies, because in aqueous solutions they have a spherical shape and can block ion channel conductance.

=== Commercial ===
- PEG is the basis of many skin creams (as cetomacrogol) and personal lubricants.
- PEG is used in a number of toothpastes as a dispersant. In this application, it binds water and helps keep xanthan gum uniformly distributed throughout the toothpaste.
- PEG is used as a component of liquid body armor.
- Polymer segments derived from PEG polyols impart flexibility to polyurethanes for applications such as elastomeric fibers (spandex) and foam cushions.
- In low-molecular-weight formulations (e.g. PEG 400), it is used in Hewlett-Packard designjet printers as an ink solvent and lubricant for the print heads.
- PEG is used as an anti-foaming agent in food and drinks – its INS number is 1521 or E1521 in the EU.

=== Industrial ===
- A nitrate ester-plasticized polyethylene glycol (NEPE-75) is used in Trident II submarine-launched ballistic missile solid rocket fuel.
- Dimethyl ethers of PEG are the key ingredient of Selexol, a solvent used by coal-burning, integrated gasification combined cycle (IGCC) power plants to remove carbon dioxide and hydrogen sulfide from the syngas stream.
- PEG has been used as the gate insulator in an electric double-layer transistor to induce superconductivity in an insulator.
- PEG is used as a polymer host for solid polymer electrolytes. Although not yet in commercial production, many groups around the globe are engaged in research on solid polymer electrolytes involving PEG, to improve their properties, and in permitting their use in batteries, electro-chromic display systems, and other products in the future.
- PEG is injected into industrial processes to reduce foaming in separation equipment.
- PEG is used as a binder in the preparation of technical ceramics.
- PEG was used as an additive to silver halide photographic emulsions.
- PEG is used as an active ingredient in agricultural soil wetter, which improves water-retention and seedling growth.
- PEGs and PEG–based polymers are also common constituents of agricultural formulations, where they serve as additives that enhance the stability and application efficiency of active ingredients such as pesticides and fertilizers. An inventory of formulation additives used in Germany and Switzerland identified PEG-based (co)polymers as the most frequently occurring class of water-soluble polymers in these products, accounting for roughly half of all identified polymers by trade name.
- Binary polyethylene oxide and titania solid-state redox electrolytes are used today for efficient nanocrystalline TiO2 photoelectrochemical cells.

=== Entertainment ===
- PEG is used to extend the size and durability of very large soap bubbles.
- PEG is an ingredient in some personal lubricants. (Not to be confused with propylene glycol.)
- PEG is the main ingredient in the paint (known as "fill") in paintballs.

== Side effects ==
Polyethylene oxides (PEO's) have "very low single dose oral toxicity", on the order of tens of grams per kilogram of human body weight when ingested by mouth. Because of its low toxicity, PEO is used in a variety of edible products. It is also used as a lubricating coating for various surfaces in aqueous and non-aqueous applications.

The precursor to PEGs is ethylene oxide, which is hazardous. Ethylene glycol and its ethers are nephrotoxic (poisonous to the kidneys) if applied to damaged skin.

The United States Food and Drug Administration (FDA or US FDA) regards PEG as biologically inert and safe.

A 2015 study appears to challenge the FDA's conclusion. In the study, a high-sensitivity ELISA assay detected anti-PEG antibodies in 72% of random blood plasma samples collected from 1990 to 1999. According to the study's authors, this result suggests that anti-PEG antibodies may be present, typically at low levels, in people who were never treated with PEGylated drugs. Due to its ubiquity in many products and the large percentage of the population with antibodies to PEG, which indicates an allergic reaction, hypersensitive reactions to PEG are an increasing health concern. Allergy to PEG is usually discovered after a person has been diagnosed with an allergy to several seemingly unrelated products—including processed foods, cosmetics, drugs, and other substances—that contain or were manufactured with PEG.

== Available forms and nomenclature ==
PEG, PEO, and POE refer to an oligomer or polymer of ethylene oxide. The three names are chemically synonymous, but historically PEG is preferred in the biomedical field, whereas PEO is more prevalent in the field of polymer chemistry. Because different applications require different polymer chain lengths, PEG has tended to refer to oligomers and polymers with a molecular mass below 20,000 g/mol, PEO to polymers with a molecular mass above 20,000 g/mol, and POE to a polymer of any molecular mass. PEGs are prepared by polymerization of ethylene oxide and are commercially available over a wide range of molecular weights from 300 g/mol to 10,000,000 g/mol.

PEG and PEO are liquids or low-melting solids, depending on their molecular weights. While PEG and PEO with different molecular weights find use in different applications and have different physical properties (e.g. viscosity) due to chain length effects, their chemical properties are nearly identical. Different forms of PEG are also available, depending on the initiator used for the polymerization process – the most common initiator is a monofunctional methyl ether PEG, or methoxypoly(ethylene glycol), abbreviated mPEG. Lower-molecular-weight PEGs are also available as purer oligomers, referred to as monodisperse, uniform, or discrete. Very high-purity PEG has recently been shown to be crystalline, allowing the determination of a crystal structure by x-ray crystallography. Since purification and separation of pure oligomers is difficult, the price for this type of quality is often 10–1000 fold that of polydisperse PEG.

PEGs are also available with different geometries.

- Branched PEGs have three to ten PEG chains emanating from a central core group.
- Star PEGs have 10 to 100 PEG chains emanating from a central core group.
- Comb PEGs have multiple PEG chains normally grafted onto a polymer backbone.

The numbers that are often included in the names of PEGs indicate their average molecular weights (e.g. a PEG with n = 9 would have an average molecular weight of approximately 400 daltons, and would be labeled PEG 400). Most PEGs include molecules with a distribution of molecular weights (i.e. they are polydisperse). The size distribution can be characterized statistically by its weight average molecular weight (M_{w}) and its number average molecular weight (M_{n}), the ratio of which is called the polydispersity index (Đ_{M}). M_{w} and M_{n} can be measured by mass spectrometry.

PEGylation is the act of covalently coupling a PEG structure to another larger molecule, for example, a therapeutic protein, which is then referred to as a PEGylated protein. PEGylated interferon alfa-2a or alfa-2b are commonly used injectable treatments for hepatitis C infection.

PEG is soluble in water, methanol, ethanol, acetonitrile, benzene, and dichloromethane, and is insoluble in diethyl ether and hexane. It is coupled to hydrophobic molecules to produce non-ionic surfactants.

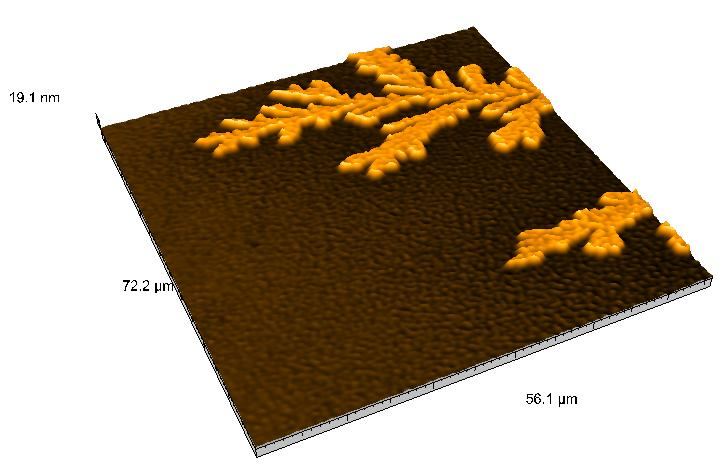
Polyethylene oxide (PEO, M_{w} 4 kDa) nanometric crystallites (4 nm)

PEG and related polymers (PEG phospholipid constructs) are often sonicated when used in biomedical applications. However, as reported by Murali et al., PEG is very sensitive to sonolytic degradation and PEG degradation products can be toxic to mammalian cells. It is, thus, imperative to assess potential PEG degradation to ensure that the final material does not contain undocumented contaminants that can introduce artifacts into experimental results.

PEGs and methoxypolyethylene glycols are manufactured by Dow Chemical under the trade name Carbowax for industrial use, and Carbowax Sentry for food and pharmaceutical use. They vary in consistency from liquid to solid, depending on the molecular weight, as indicated by a number following the name. They are used commercially in numerous applications, including foods, cosmetics, pharmaceutics, biomedicine, dispersing agents, solvents, ointments, suppository bases, as tablet excipients, and as laxatives. Some specific groups are lauromacrogols, nonoxynols, octoxynols, and poloxamers.

== Production ==
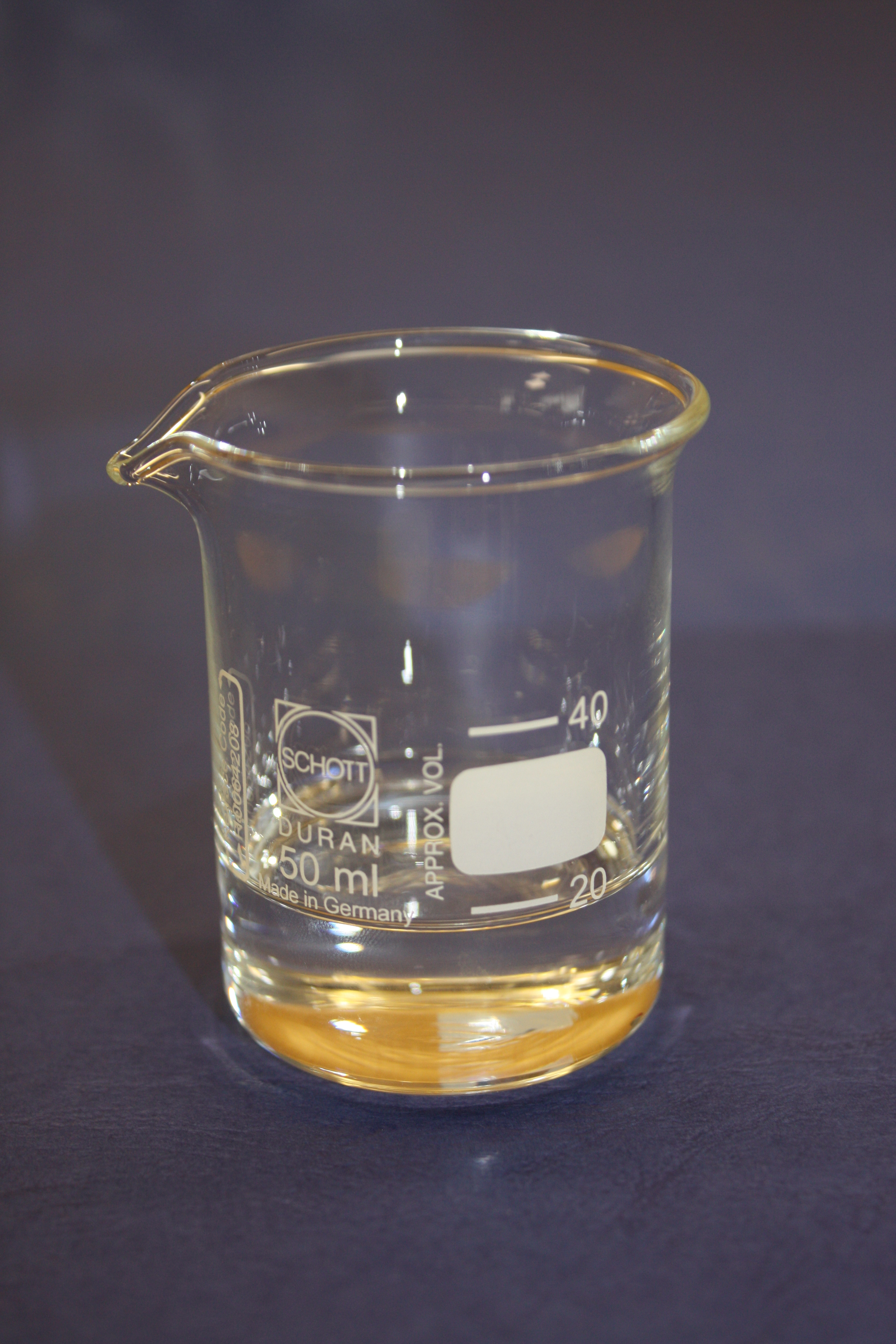
Polyethylene glycol 400, pharmaceutical quality

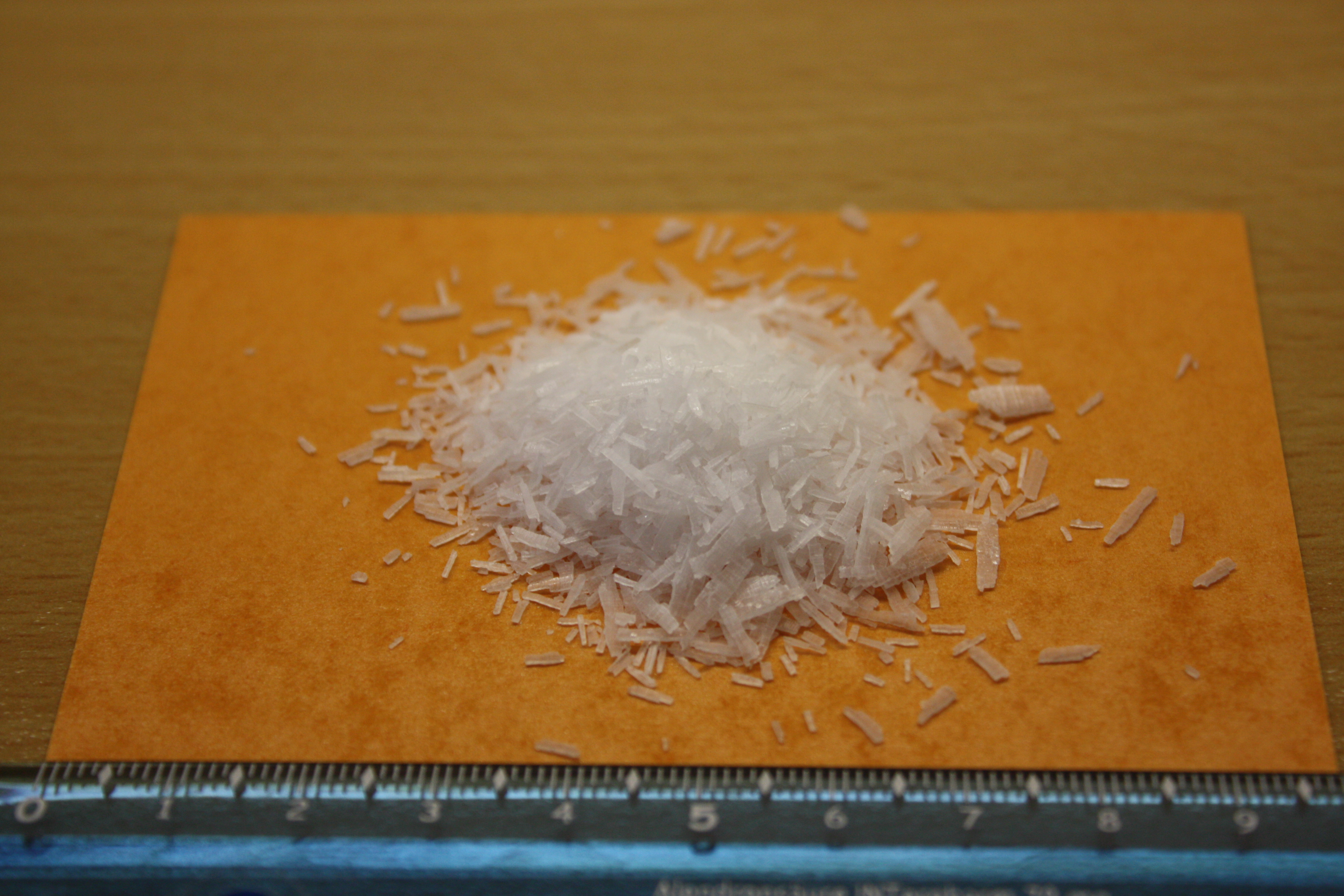
Polyethylene glycol 4000, pharmaceutical quality

The production of polyethylene glycol was first reported in 1859. Both A. V. Lourenço and Charles Adolphe Wurtz independently isolated products that were polyethylene glycols. Polyethylene glycol is produced by the interaction of ethylene oxide with water, ethylene glycol, or ethylene glycol oligomers. The reaction is catalyzed by acidic or basic catalysts. Ethylene glycol and its oligomers are preferable as a starting material instead of water because they allow the creation of polymers with a low polydispersity (narrow molecular weight distribution). Polymer chain length depends on the ratio of reactants.

HOCH_{2}CH_{2}OH + n(CH_{2}CH_{2}O) → HO(CH_{2}CH_{2}O)_{n+1}H

Depending on the catalyst type, the mechanism of polymerization can be cationic or anionic. The anionic mechanism is preferable because it allows one to obtain PEG with a low polydispersity. Polymerization of ethylene oxide is an exothermic process. Overheating or contaminating ethylene oxide with catalysts, such as alkalis or metal oxides, can lead to runaway polymerization, which can end in an explosion after a few hours.

Polyethylene oxide, or high-molecular-weight polyethylene glycol, is synthesized by suspension polymerization. It is necessary to hold the growing polymer chain in solution in the course of the polycondensation process. The reaction is catalyzed by magnesium-, aluminium-, or calcium-organoelement compounds. To prevent coagulation of polymer chains from solution, chelating additives, such as dimethylglyoxime, are used.

Alkaline catalysts, such as sodium hydroxide (NaOH), potassium hydroxide (KOH), or sodium carbonate (Na_{2}CO_{3}), are used to prepare low-molecular-weight polyethylene glycol.

== See also ==
- Lauryl methyl gluceth-10 hydroxypropyl dimonium chloride
- Lysozyme PEGylation
- PEG-PVA
- Polyethylene glycol propylene glycol cocoates
