= Osage Bank of Fairfax =

- U.S. National Register of Historic Places
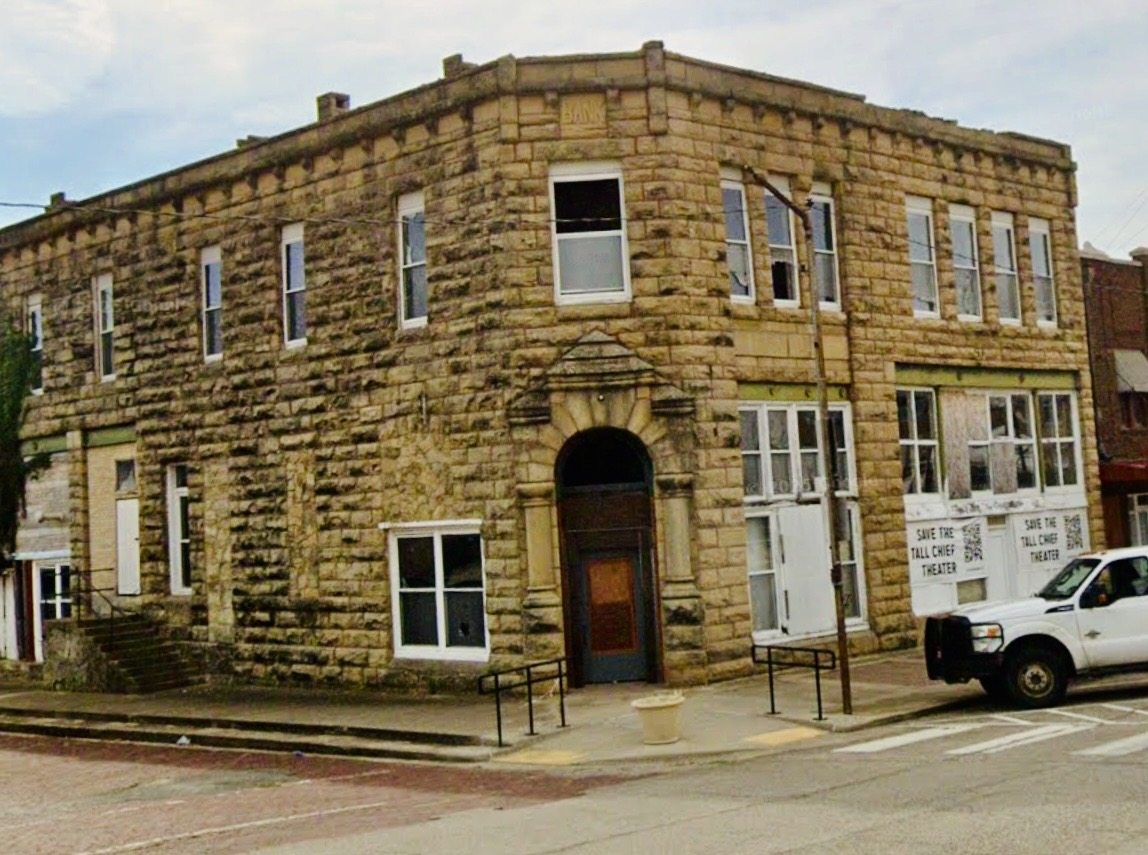

- Location within Oklahoma Location within the United States
- Location: 250 N. Main St. Fairfax, Oklahoma
- Coordinates: 36.57328°N 96.70409°W
- Built: 1904
- Architectural style: Richardsonian Romanesque
- MPS: Richardsonian Romanesque Banks of Osage County TR
- NRHP reference No.: 84000315
- Added to NRHP: November 23, 1984

The Osage Bank of Fairfax was the first bank building built in Osage County. It was built in 1904, at the time of the Oklahoma oil boom. It is one of four small bank buildings built in Richardsonian Romanesque style in Osage County, Oklahoma during 1904–1911. The others are Bank of Hominy, Bank of Burbank, and Bank of Bigheart.

It was listed on the National Register of Historic Places in 1984.

It is located on the southeast corner of N. Main St. (which is Oklahoma State Highway 18) and E. Elm St. in Fairfax.
