= Barnsdall, Oklahoma =

City in Osage County, Oklahoma

- City
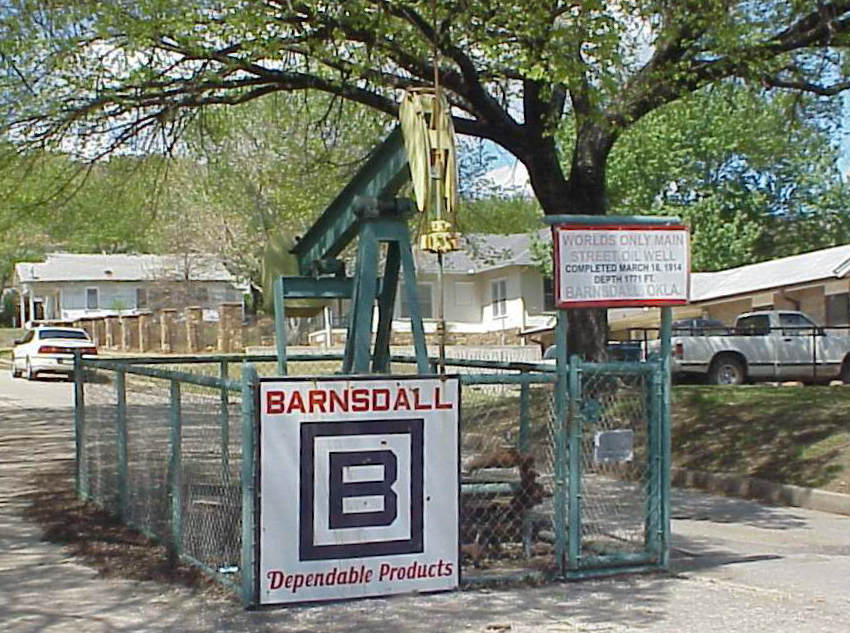
- Barnsdall Main Street Well Site (2007)
- Nickname: Bigheart
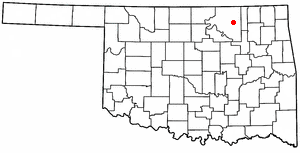
- Location of Barnsdall in Oklahoma
- Coordinates: 36°33′20″N 96°09′16″W
- Country: United States
- State: Oklahoma
- County: Osage
- Founded: 1905 (Bigheart); 1922 (Barnsdall)
- Named for: James Bigheart; Theodore Barnsdall

Government
  - Type: Mayor-council
  - Mayor: Johnny Kelley

Area
  - Total: 1.18 sq mi (3.06 km^{2})
  - Land: 0.98 sq mi (2.55 km^{2})
  - Water: 0.20 sq mi (0.51 km^{2})
- Elevation: 735 ft (224 m)

Population (2020)
  - Total: 1,034
  - Density: 1,050/sq mi (405/km^{2})
- Time zone: UTC-6 (Central (CST))
  - Summer (DST): UTC-5 (CDT)
- ZIP Code: 74002
- Area code: 539 / 918
- FIPS code: 40-04250
- GNIS ID: 2409788
- Website: cityofbarnsdallok.org

Barnsdall is a city in Osage County, Oklahoma, United States. As of the 2020 census, the population of the city was 1,034.

== History ==
Bigheart in 1910

The community was founded in 1905 and originally named Bigheart, for the Osage Chief James Bigheart. It was initially a 160-acre site along the Midland Valley Railroad in March 1905. The railroad opened Bigheart Station in September 1905 and the Bigheart Post Office opened in January 1906. The community was exempted from the Osage allotment, so lots could be sold to anyone. Lots were auctioned in May 1906. The first newspaper, the Bigheart Star, first appeared in 1906.

Joshua Cosden built the Southwest Refining Company oil refinery in 1910. He sold it to Stone and Webster of Boston, Massachusetts in 1917. The Barnsdall Oil Company had discovered the nearby Bigheart (later Barnsdall) oilfield in 1916. The Barnsdall Oil Company, bought the refinery in 1921. The community was renamed Barnsdall on January 1, 1922, in honor of Theodore N. Barnsdall.

Barnsdall experienced a tornado in April 1911, a major fire in March 1913 and a flood in September 1915. Despite these calamities, the population increased from 307 in 1910 to 2,099 in 1920. That proved to be the high point of population in the community.

Henry L. Doherty bought the holdings of Theodore N. Barnsdall, founder of Barnsdall Oil Company, in 1912. Barnsdall Refining Company renamed itself Bareco Oil Company in 1940. It ceased refining oil in 1946 and began producing microcrystalline waxes that year. Petrolite Corporation (later part of Baker Hughes) bought Bareco and continued to operate the plant. The business was sold to SK Capital in September 2020 and renamed NuCera Solutions; and, NuCera was sold in September 2022 to Chase Corporation. NuCera continued as operator until July 2024, when tornado damage led to announcement of the plant's phased shutdown.

The Midland Valley Railroad trackage both north and south of Barnsdall has been abandoned, the southern portion in 2000. At least some of the route south of Barnsdall has been converted into a rail trail.

=== 2024 tornadoes ===
On the evening of April 1, 2024, an EF1 tornado struck Barnsdall, damaging 35 homes, but no injuries were reported.

On the evening of May 6, 2024, a large and destructive EF4 tornado hit the city, the second tornado in the city within five weeks. Peak wind speeds were estimated at 180 mph (290 km/h). Two fatalities occurred in Barnsdall as a result of the tornado, and several structures were completely destroyed. Barnsdall Nursing Home was among the structures that were damaged. Several buildings, including schools, were opened to those who had homes damaged or destroyed and needed shelter. At least ten people reportedly suffered injuries due to the tornado. Significant damage was done to the NuCera refinery.

== Geography ==
Barnsdall is located 17 miles (27 km) southeast of Pawhuska, the Osage County seat, and 40 miles (64 km) northwest of Tulsa.

According to the United States Census Bureau, the city has a total area of 0.6 square miles (1.6 km^{2}), all land.

=== Climate ===
Climate data for Barnsdall, Oklahoma
Month	Jan	Feb	Mar	Apr	May	Jun	Jul	Aug	Sep	Oct	Nov	Dec	Year
Mean daily maximum °F (°C)	46.7 (8.2)	52.5 (11.4)	63.1 (17.3)	74.1 (23.4)	80.5 (26.9)	88.3 (31.3)	94.5 (34.7)	93.8 (34.3)	85.2 (29.6)	75.0 (23.9)	61.2 (16.2)	49.7 (9.8)	72.1 (22.3)
Mean daily minimum °F (°C)	22.5 (−5.3)	27.4 (−2.6)	37.0 (2.8)	48.1 (8.9)	56.5 (13.6)	65.2 (18.4)	69.8 (21.0)	67.6 (19.8)	60.3 (15.7)	48.0 (8.9)	37.0 (2.8)	26.4 (−3.1)	47.2 (8.4)
Average precipitation inches (mm)	1.4 (36)	1.9 (48)	3.7 (94)	3.3 (84)	4.8 (120)	4.7 (120)	2.9 (74)	3.5 (89)	5.6 (140)	3.2 (81)	3.0 (76)	1.9 (48)	39.9 (1,010)
Source: Weatherbase.com

== Demographics ==
Historical population
Census	Pop.	Note	%±
1910	307		—
1920	2,099		583.7%
1930	2,001		−4.7%
1940	1,831		−8.5%
1950	1,708		−6.7%
1960	1,663		−2.6%
1970	1,579		−5.1%
1980	1,501		−4.9%
1990	1,316		−12.3%
2000	1,325		0.7%
2010	1,243		−6.2%
2020	1,034		−16.8%
2020 Cenus Results

=== 2020 census ===
As of the 2020 census, Barnsdall had a population of 1,034. The median age was 39.2 years, with 25.1% of residents under the age of 18 and 19.6% aged 65 or older. For every 100 females there were 89.7 males, and for every 100 females age 18 and over there were 87.9 males age 18 and over.

Less than 0.1% of residents lived in urban areas, while 100.0% lived in rural areas.

There were 395 households in Barnsdall, of which 33.9% had children under the age of 18 living in them. Of all households, 45.1% were married-couple households, 16.5% were households with a male householder and no spouse or partner present, and 27.8% were households with a female householder and no spouse or partner present. About 28.4% of all households were made up of individuals and 14.7% had someone living alone who was 65 years of age or older.

There were 472 housing units, of which 16.3% were vacant. Among occupied housing units, 72.4% were owner-occupied and 27.6% were renter-occupied, with a homeowner vacancy rate of 2.7% and a rental vacancy rate of 9.2%.

Racial composition as of the 2020 census
Race	Percent
White	64.3%
Black or African American	0.3%
American Indian and Alaska Native	20.4%
Asian	0.2%
Native Hawaiian and Other Pacific Islander	0.1%
Some other race	0.3%
Two or more races	14.4%
Hispanic or Latino (of any race)	1.7%

=== 2022 American Community Survey ===
As of the 2022 American Community Survey estimates, there were 1,019 people and 360 households. The population density was 1,035.6 inhabitants per square mile (399.8/km^{2}). There were 461 housing units at an average density of 468.5 per square mile (180.9/km^{2}). The racial makeup of the city was 65.6% White, 19.7% Native American or Alaskan Native, and 0.7% Black or African American, with 14.0% from two or more races. Hispanics or Latinos of any race were 5.3% of the population.

Of the 360 households, 26.4% had children under the age of 18 living with them, 35.6% had seniors 65 years or older living with them, 54.2% were married couples living together, 5.8% were couples cohabitating, 11.7% had a male householder with no partner present, and 28.3% had a female householder with no partner present. The median household size was 2.74 and the median family size was 3.42.

The age distribution was 28.0% under 18, 11.4% from 18 to 24, 19.0% from 25 to 44, 21.5% from 45 to 64, and 20.1% who were 65 or older. The median age was 36.8 years. For every 100 females, there were 111.4 males.

The median income for a household was $56,500, with family households having a median income of $67,625 and non-family households $23,516. The per capita income was $23,458. Males working full-time jobs had median earnings of $40,402 compared to $34,688 for females. Out of the 982 people with a determined poverty status, 6.5% were below the poverty line. Further, 2.2% of minors and 4.6% of seniors were below the poverty line.

In the survey, residents self-identified with various ethnic ancestries. People of German descent made up 16.0% of the population of the town, followed by Irish at 14.7%, American at 9.2%, English at 4.9%, Dutch at 2.5%, Caribbean (excluding Hispanics) at 1.4%, Scotch-Irish at 0.8%, and Arab at 0.7%.

== Economy ==
NuCera Solutions, a manufacturer of specialty waxes and polymers and the town's largest employer was located in Barnsdall. On May 6, 2024, the plant sustained severe damage from an EF4 tornado. It was announced on July 30, 2024, that the plant would close permanently in 6–12 months, despite initial efforts to rebuild the plant.

== Attractions ==
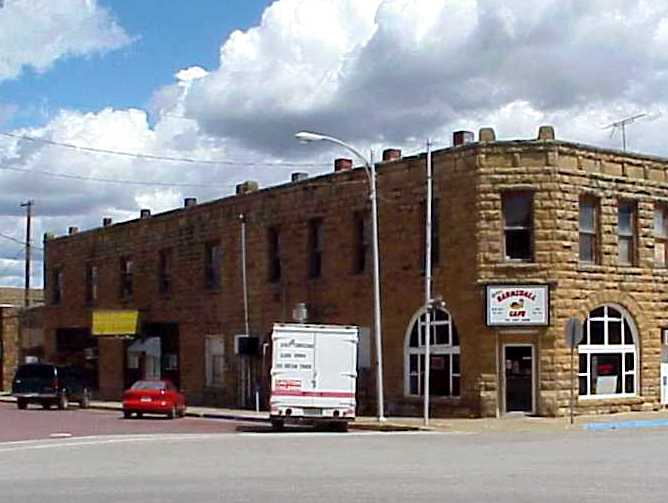
Bank of Bigheart building in Barnsdall. Built in 1911, it is the community's oldest surviving commercial building.

Barnsdall has two properties listed on the National Register of Historic Places listings in Osage County, Oklahoma:

- Bank of Bigheart, which is the communities oldest commercial building
- Barnsdall Main Street Well Site, an oil well in the middle of Main Street.

In addition, the Woolaroc Ranch Historic District, 8 miles east of the junction of State Highway 11 and State Highway 123, is near Barnsdall.

Lake Waxhoma, about 4 miles east, offers fishing opportunities, as well as being a key water source for the town.

== Education ==
Public education is provided by the Barnsdall Independent School District. The District includes Barnsdall Elementary School and Barnsdall High School.

== Notable people ==
- Anita Bryant (1940–2024), singer and anti-gay political activist, born in Barnsdall
- Clark Gable (1901–1960), actor in Gone With the Wind, was born elsewhere but worked for a time in the Barnsdall area on oil rigs.
- Thomas Hall (born 1939), retired U.S. Navy rear admiral
- J. Edward Roush (1920–2004), lawyer, 8-term U.S. Representative from Indiana
