= Stable nucleic acid lipid particle =

SNALP Structure

Stable nucleic acid lipid particles (SNALPs) are microscopic particles approximately 120 nanometers in diameter, smaller than the wavelengths of visible light. They have been used to deliver siRNAs therapeutically to mammals in vivo. In SNALPs, the siRNA is surrounded by a lipid bilayer containing a mixture of cationic and fusogenic lipids, coated with diffusible polyethylene glycol.

== Introduction ==
RNA interference(RNAi) is a process that occurs naturally within the cytoplasm inhibiting gene expression at specific sequences. Regulation of gene expression through RNAi is possible by introducing small interfering RNAs(siRNAs), which effectively silence expression of a targeted gene. RNAi activates the RNA-induced silencing complex(RISC) containing siRNA, siRNA derived from cleaved dsRNA. The siRNA guides the RISC complex to a specific sequence on the mRNA that is cleaved by RISC and, consequently, silences those genes.

However, without modifications to the RNA backbone or inclusion of inverted bases at either end, siRNA instability in the plasma makes it extremely difficult to apply this technique in vivo. Pattern recognition receptors(PRRs), which can be grouped as endocytic PRRs or signaling PRRs, are expressed in all cells of the innate immune system. Signaling PRRs, in particular, include Toll-like receptors(TLRs) and are involved primarily with identifying pathogen-associated molecular patterns(PAMPs). For example, TLRs can recognize specific regions conserved in various pathogens, recognition stimulating an immune response with potentially devastating effects to the organism. In particular, TLR 3 recognizes both dsRNA characteristic of viral replication and siRNA, which is also double-stranded. In addition to this instability, another limitation of siRNA therapy concerns the inability to target a tissue with any specificity.

SNALPs, though, may provide the stability and specificity required for this mode of RNAi therapy to be effective. Consisting of a lipid bilayer, SNALPs are able to provide stability to siRNAs by protecting them from nucleases within the plasma that would degrade them. In addition, delivery of siRNAs is subject to endosomal trafficking, potentially exposing them to TLR3 and TLR7, and can lead to activation of interferons and proinflammatory cytokines. However, SNALPs allow siRNA uptake into the endosome without activating Toll-like receptors and consequently stimulating an impeding immune response, thus enabling siRNA escape from the endosome.

== Development of SNALP delivery of siRNA ==
Downregulation of gene expression via siRNA has been an important research tool in in vitro studies. Susceptibility of siRNAs to nuclease degradation, though, makes use of them in vivo problematic. In 2005, researchers working with hepatitis B virus(HBV) in rodents, determined that certain modifications of the siRNA prevented degradation by nucleases within the plasma and lead to increased gene silencing compared to unmodified siRNA. Modifications to the sense and antisense strands were made differentially. With respect to both sense and antisense strands, 2'-OH was substituted with 2'-fluoro at all pyrimidine positions. In addition, sense strands were modified at all purine positions with deoxyribose, antisense strands modified with 2'-O-methyl at the same positions. The 5' and 3' ends of the sense strand were capped with abasic inverted repeats, while a phosphorothioate linkage was incorporated at the 3' end of the antisense strand.

Although this research demonstrated a potential RNAi therapy using modified siRNA, the 90% reduction in HBV DNA in rodents resulted from a 30 mg/kg dosage with frequent administration. Because this is not a viable dosing regime, this same group looked at the effects of encapsulating the siRNA in a PEGylated lipid bilayer, or SNALP. Specifically, the lipid bilayer facilitates uptake into the cell and subsequent release from the endosome, the PEGylated outer layer providing stability during formulation due to the resulting hydrophilicity of the exterior. According to this 2005 study, researchers obtained 90% reduction in HBV DNA with a 3 mg/kg/day dose of siRNA for three days, a dose substantially lower than the earlier study. In addition, in contrast to unmodified or modified and non-encapsulated siRNA, administration of SNALP-delivered siRNA resulted in no detectable levels of interferons, such as IFN-a, or inflammatory cytokines associated with immunostimulation. Even so, researchers acknowledged that more work was necessary in order to reach a feasible dose and dosing regime.

In 2006, researchers working on silencing of apolipoprotein B(ApoB) in non-human primates achieved 90% silencing with a single dose of 2.5 mg/kg of SNALP-delivered APOB-specific siRNA. ApoB is a protein involved with the assembly and secretion of very-low-density lipoprotein(VLDL) and low-density lipoprotein(LDL), and it is expressed primarily in the liver and jejunum. Both VLDL and LDL are important in cholesterol transport and its metabolism. Not only was this degree of silencing observed very quickly, in about 24 hours post-administration, but the silencing effects maintained for over 22 days after only a single dose. Researchers tested a 1 mg/kg single dose, too, obtaining a 68% silencing of the target gene, indicating dose-dependent silencing. This dose-dependent silencing was evident not only on the degree of silencing but the duration of silencing, expression of the target gene recovering 72 hours post-administration.

Although SNALPs having a 100 nm diameter have been used effectively to target specific genes for silencing, there are a variety of systemic barriers that relate specifically to size. For example, diffusion into solid tumors is impeded by large SNALPs and, similarly, inflamed cells having enhanced permeation and retention make it difficult for large SNALPs to enter. In addition, reticuloendothelial elimination, blood–brain barrier size-selectivity and limitations of capillary fenestrae all necessitate a smaller SNALP in order to effectively deliver target-specific siRNA. In 2012, scientists in Germany developed what they termed "mono-NALPs" using a fairly simple solvent exchange method involving progressive dilution of a 50% isopropanol solution. What results is a very stable delivery system similar to traditional SNALPs, but one having only a diameter of 30 nm. The mono-NALPs developed here, however, are inactive, but can become active carriers by implementing specific targeting and release mechanisms used by similar delivery systems.

== Applications ==
=== Zaire Ebola virus (ZEBOV) ===
We were able to confer complete protection with either a pool of siRNAs encapsulated in SNALPs or individual SNALP siRNAs, depending on their relative potency ... [the most potent siRNA] ... conferred absolute protection, that is 100 percent survival, and also contributed to complete aviremia in the infected guinea pigs. So there was no detectable Ebola virus even though the animals had been inoculated with essentially 30,000 times the lethal infectious dose for the virus.

— Thomas Geisbert, USAMRIID, May 2006

In May 2010, an application of SNALPs to the Ebola Zaire virus made headlines, as the preparation was able to cure rhesus macaques when administered shortly after their exposure to a lethal dose of the virus, which can be up to 90% lethal to humans in sporadic outbreaks in Africa. The treatment used for rhesus macaques consisted of three siRNAs (staggered duplexes of RNA) targeting three viral genes. The SNALPs (around 81 nm in size here) were formulated by spontaneous vesiculation from a mixture of cholesterol, dipalmitoyl phosphatidylcholine, 3-N-[(ω-methoxy poly(ethylene glycol)2000)carbamoyl]-1,2-dimyrestyloxypropylamine, and cationic 1,2-dilinoleyloxy-3-N,N-dimethylaminopropane.

In addition to the rhesus macaque application, SNALPs have also been proven to protect cavia porcellua from viremia and death when administered shortly after postexposure to ZEBOV. A polymerase (L) gene-specific siRNAs delivery system was imposed upon four genes associated with the viral genomic RNA in the ribonucleoprotein complex found within EBOV particles (three of which match the application above): NP, VP30, VP35, and the L protein. The SNALPs ranged from 71 – 84 nm in size and were composed of synthetic cholesterol, phospholipid DSPC, PEG lipid PEGC-DMA, and cationic lipid DLinDMA at the molar ratio of 48:20:2:30. The results confirm complete protection against viremia and death in guinea pigs when administered a SNALP-siRNA delivery system after diagnosis of the Ebola virus, thus proving this technology to be an effective treatment. Future studies will focus mainly upon evaluating the effects of siRNA ‘cocktails’ on EBOV genes to increase antiviral effects.

=== Hepatocellular Carcinoma ===
In 2010, researchers developed an applicable targeting therapy for hepatocellular carcinoma (HCC) in humans. The identification of CSN5, the fifth subunit of the COP9 signalosome complex found in early HCC, was used as a therapeutic target for siRNA induction. Systemic delivery of modified CSN5siRNA encapsulated in SNALPs significantly inhibited hepatic tumor growth in the Huh7-luc+ orthotopic xenograft model of human liver cancer. SiRNA-mediated CSN5 knockdown was also proven to inhibit cell-cycle progression and increases the rate of apoptosis in HCC cells in vitro. Not only do these results demonstrate the role of CSN5 in liver cancer progression, they also indicate that CSN5 has an essential role in HCC pathogenesis. In conclusion, SNALPs have been proven to significantly reduce hepatocellular carcinoma tumor growth in human Huh7-luc* cells through therapeutic silencing.

=== Tumors ===
In 2009, researchers developed siRNAs capable of targeting both polo-like kinase 1(PLK1) and kinesin spindle protein(KSP). Both proteins are important to the cell-cycle of tumor cells, PLK1 involved with phosphorylation of a variety of proteins and KSP integral to chromosome segregation during mitosis. Specifically, bipolar mitotic spindles are unable to form when KSP is inhibited, leading to arrest of the cell cycle and, eventually, apoptosis. Likewise, inhibition of PLK1 facilitates mitotic arrests and cell apoptosis. According to the study, a 2 mg/kg dose of PLK1-specific siRNA administered for 3 weeks to mice implanted with tumors resulted in increased survival times and obvious reduction of tumors. In fact, the median survival time of treated mice was 51 days as opposed to 32 days for the controls. Further, only 2 of the 6 mice treated had noticeable tumors around the implantation site. Even so, GAPDH, a tumor-derived signal, was present at low levels, indicating significant suppression of tumor growth but not complete elimination. Still, the results suggested minimal toxicity and no significant dysfunction of the bone marrow. Animals treated with KSP-specific siRNA, too, exhibited increased survival times of 28 days compared to 20 days in the controls.
