= Polyethylene glycol propylene glycol cocoates =

Names
- Other names: PEG propylene glycol cocoates; Fatty acids, coco, ethoxylated propoxylated

Identifiers
CAS Number	126645-98-5
EC Number	603-151-6

Properties
Chemical formula	CH_{3}(CH_{2})_{n}C(=O)OCH_{2}CH(CH_{3})(OCH_{2}CH_{2})_{m}OH
Molar mass	Variable
- Except where otherwise noted, data are given for materials in their standard state (at 25 °C [77 °F], 100 kPa). Infobox references

Polyethylene glycol propylene glycol cocoates or PEG propylene glycol cocoates are chemical compounds produced by the esterification of polyoxyalkyl alcohols with fatty acids from coconut oil (primarily lauric acid). Their chemical designation is PEG-8, referring to its polyethylene glycol (PEG) molecular chain length.

== Uses ==
PEG propylene glycol cocoates are used in cosmetics and toothpaste to form emulsions, which they do by reducing surface tension in the substances of which an emulsified form is required.
