= Barnsdall Main Street Well Site =

- U.S. National Register of Historic Places
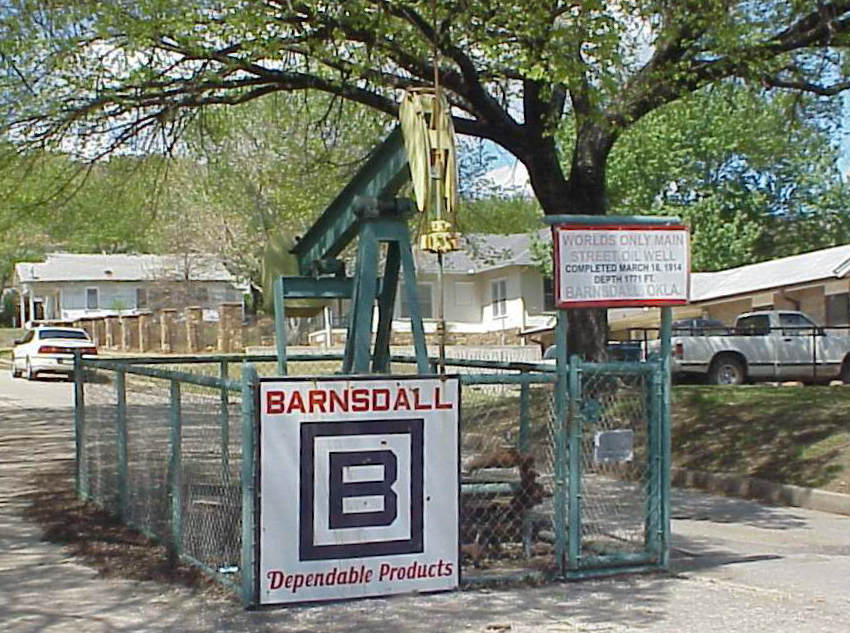
- Oil well in middle of street in Barnsdall (2007)
- Location: Barnsdall, Oklahoma
- Coordinates: 36°33′41.93″N 96°9′56.57″W
- Built: 1914
- MPS: Energy-Related Properties in Northeastern Oklahoma MPS
- NRHP reference No.: 97001153
- Added to NRHP: October 1, 1997

The Barnsdall Main Street Well (also known as Indian Territory Illuminating Oil Company Well #20 Osage County) is a formerly active oil well in the middle of Main Street in the town of Barnsdall, Oklahoma. It is believed to be the only such oil well anywhere in the world. It was listed on the National Register of Historic Places (NRHP) on October 1, 1997, as part of the "Energy Related Resources in Northeastern Oklahoma Multiple Property Submission". According to signage at the site, the well was completed on March 18, 1914, with a depth of 1,771 feet (540 m). It remained active until the 1960s.

== Description ==
The Barnsdall Main Street Well sits on Main Street, 28 feet (8.5 m) west of 8th Street in northwest Barnsdall. (Note: 8th Street is better known as Oklahoma State Highway 11) According to the NRHP application, "...this is the only publicly accessible historic well site in the Barnsdall oil field." It was listed under NRHP Criterion A, with a period of significance of 1914-1930. The application also states that at maximum production, the well could have produced 8 to 10 barrels of oil per day. (Note: Barrels per day (BPD) is a standard unit of measurement in the oil industry. One Barrel = 42 U. S. gallons.)

The pumping unit that is now on site is not the original "flathead" model, which was replaced sometime after 1962. The more modern unit is skid mounted whose prime mover (an electric motor), gears, wellhead connections and rods appear in good condition, though the unit no longer operates. The unit is surrounded by a 4 feet (1.2 m) high chain-link fence, blocking access to the pump area.

The NRHP application states that the fact that the pump and fence are not original (and therefore not contributing resources) does not compromise the site's integrity. The explanation is that the original casing head is still in place and that it marks the exact location of the well. Additionally, the location and setting have not changed appreciably since the period of significance.

== Indian Territory Illuminating Oil Company ==
Indian Territory Illuminating Oil Company (“ITIO”) may be said to date back to 1895 when Edwin B. Foster signed a 1.5 million acre lease covering the entire Osage Nation reservation (present-day Osage County, Oklahoma). The two companies which operated the lease lands were combined to form ITIO in 1901. Edwin’s successor, Henry V. Foster, divided the entire Osage lease into blocks three miles long east to west and one-half mile wide north to south, and subleased them to other companies on a bonus and royalty basis. He ultimately leased to seventy-five separate companies while retaining a number of leases for ITIO itself to develop. In 1903, Theodore N. Barnsdall bought 51% of stock in the company. The company did well from this point, and obtained renewal of the Osage lease in 1906, albeit limited to 680,000 acres on the reservation’s east side. Barnsdall’s 51% was eventually sold to a subsidiary of Cities Service Company. The Osage lease was lost in 1916, but the company began operations in other areas of Oklahoma, such as the vicinity of Seminole. ITIO was responsible for the Oklahoma City Oil Field discovery well, brought in on December 4, 1928, and the company became a major player in that area. Cities Service Company acquired Foster’s and all remaining stock by 1940, and merged ITIO operations into other companies.
