= Richardsonian Romanesque =

Architectural style, named for Henry Hobson Richardson

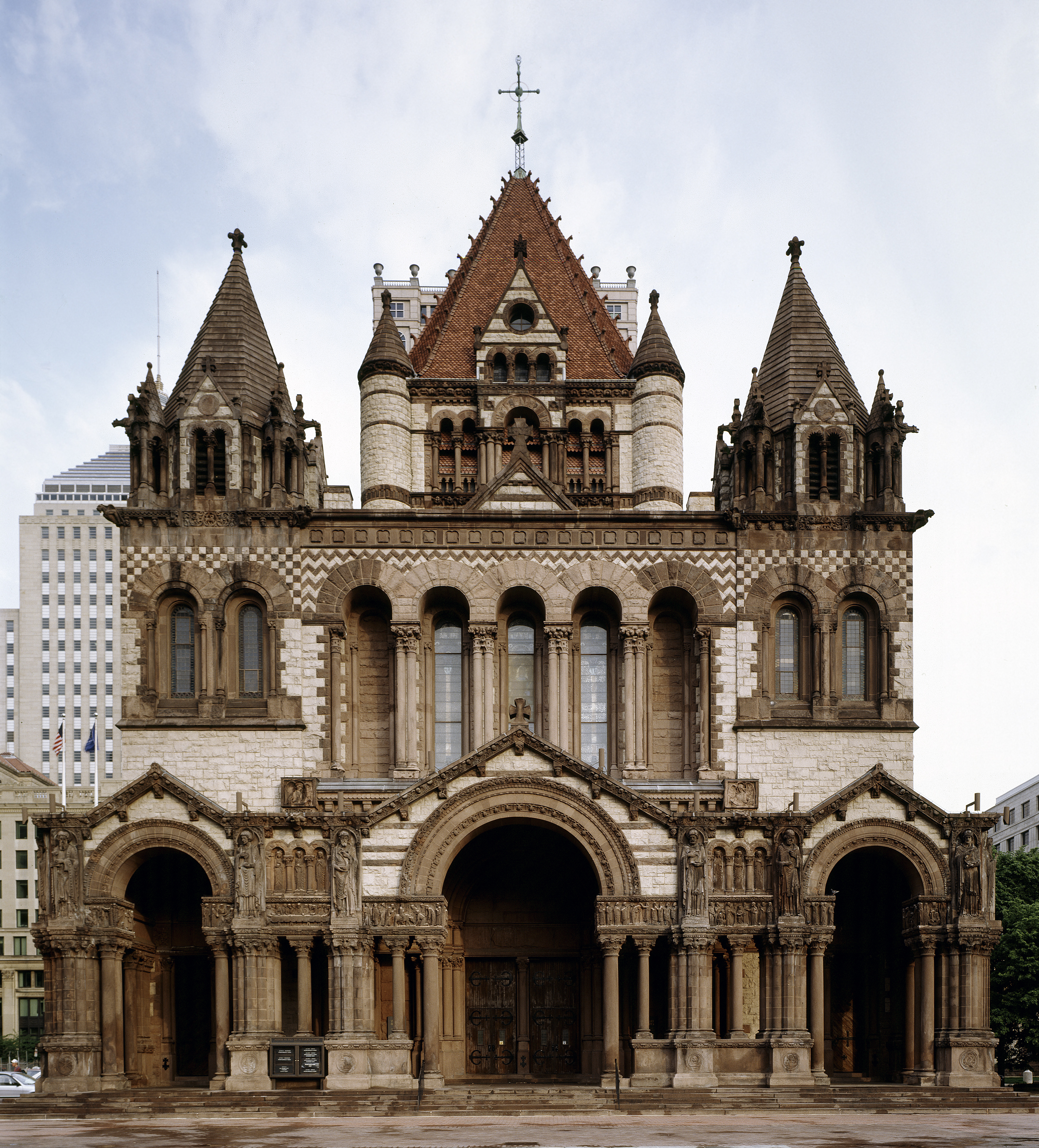
Trinity Church in Boston, designed by Richardson in 1872

Richardsonian Romanesque is a style of Romanesque Revival architecture named after the American architect Henry Hobson Richardson (1838–1886). The revival style incorporates 11th- and 12th-century southern French, Spanish, and Italian Romanesque characteristics. Richardson first used elements of the style in his Richardson Olmsted Complex in Buffalo, New York, designed in 1870, and Trinity Church in Boston is his best-known example of this medieval revival style. Multiple architects followed in this style in the late 19th century; Richardsonian Romanesque later influenced modern styles of architecture as well.

== History and development ==
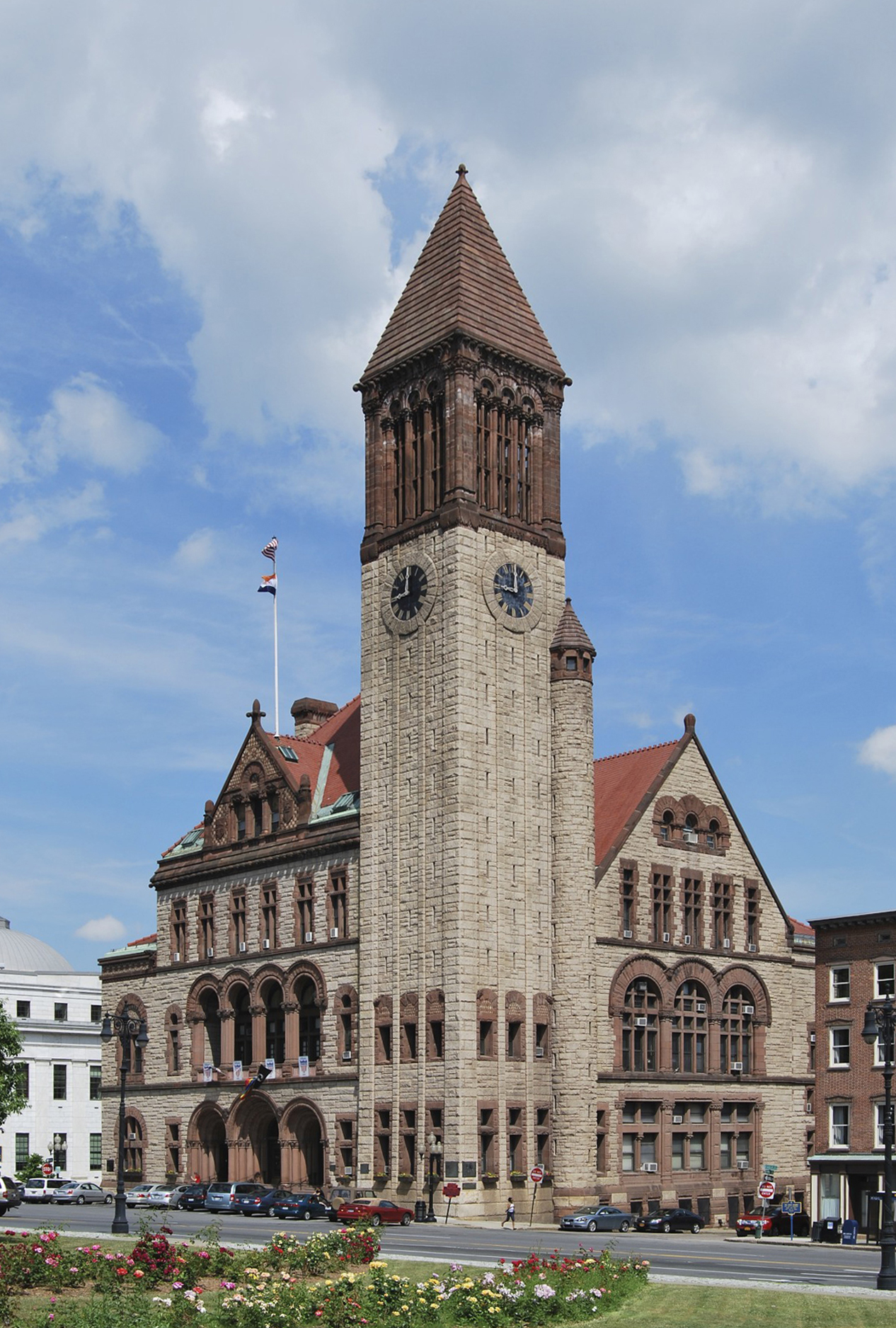
Albany City Hall in Albany, New York, designed by Richardson in 1880

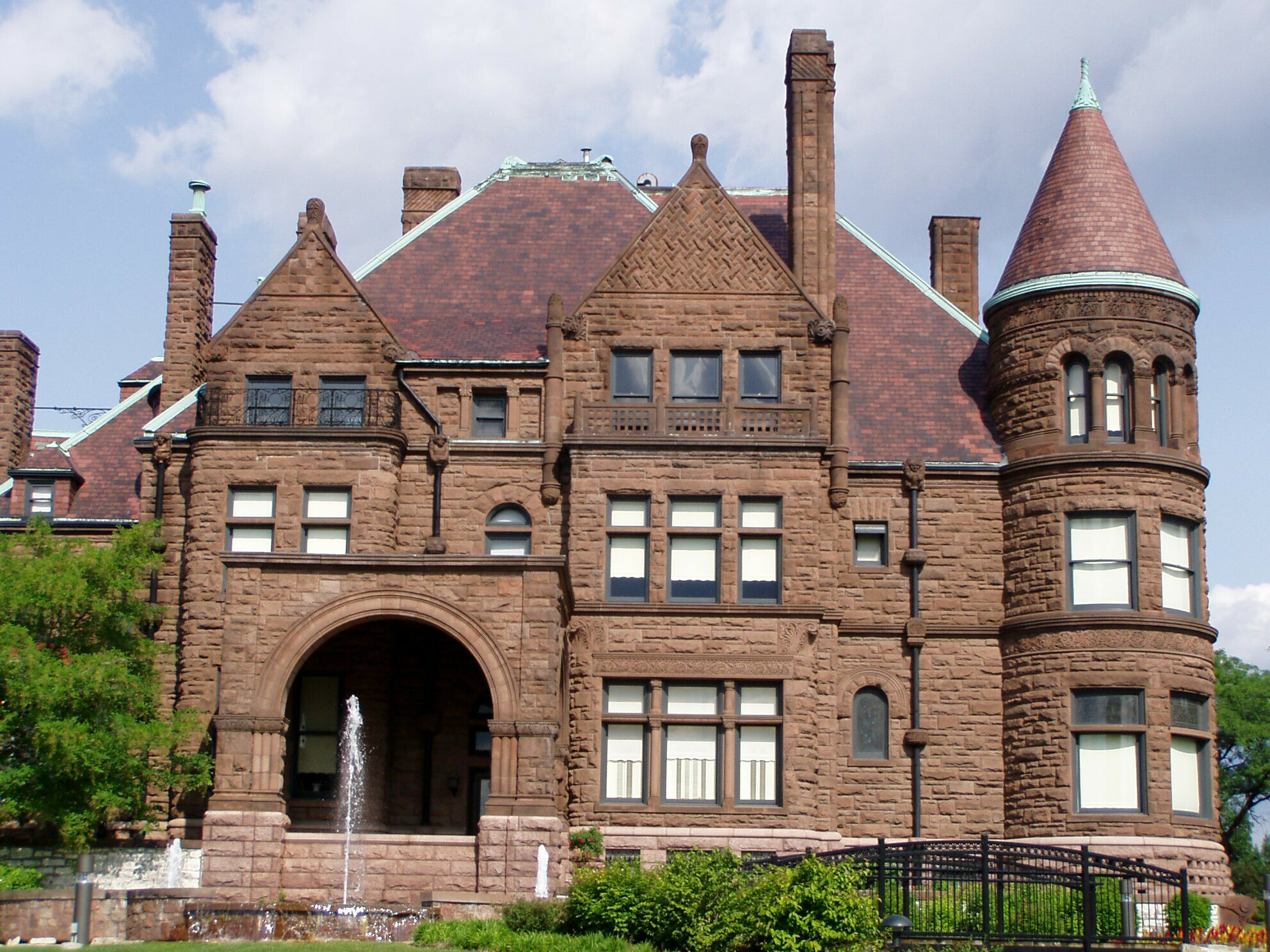
The Samuel Cupples House in St. Louis, by Thomas B. Annan in 1890, an example of a Richardsonian Romanesque-style mansion

This very free revival style incorporates 11th and 12th century southern French, Spanish and Italian Romanesque characteristics. It emphasizes clear, strong picturesque massing, round-headed "Romanesque" arches, often springing from clusters of short squat columns, recessed entrances, richly varied rustication, blank stretches of walling contrasting with bands of windows, and cylindrical towers with conical caps embedded in the walling.

== Architects working in the style ==
The style includes work by the generation of architects practicing in the 1880s, before the influence of the Beaux-Arts styles.

Some of the practitioners who most faithfully followed Richardson's proportion, massing and detailing had worked in his office. These include:

- Alexander Wadsworth Longfellow and Frank Alden (Longfellow, Alden & Harlow of Boston and Pittsburgh);
- Samuel Hannaford, of Cincinnati, Ohio
- George Shepley and Charles Coolidge (Richardson's successor firm Shepley, Rutan and Coolidge of Boston);
- Herbert C. Burdett (Marling & Burdett of Buffalo, New York)
- Mason Maury of Louisville, Kentucky

Other architects who employed Richardson Romanesque elements in their designs include:

- Spier and Rohns and George D. Mason, both firms from Detroit
- Edward J. Lennox, Toronto-based architect;
- John Wellborn Root, in Chicago
- Harvey Ellis, in Minneapolis
- Theodore Link, in St. Louis and surrounding area

The style also influenced the Chicago school of architecture and architects Louis Sullivan and Frank Lloyd Wright.

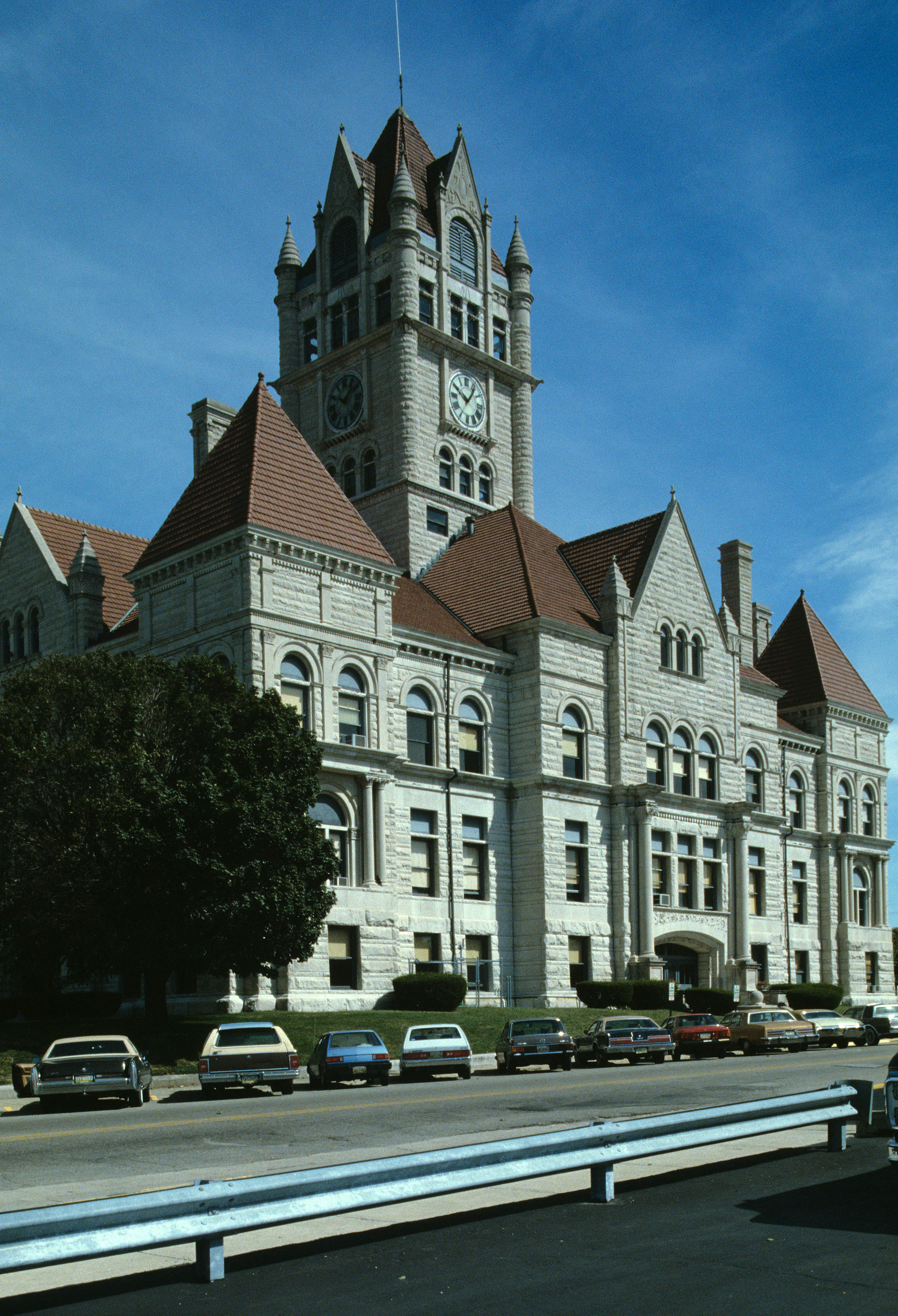
Rush County Courthouse, Rushville, Indiana, by A. W. Rush & Sons

Overseas, Folke Zettervall was influenced by the Richardson style when he designed several railway stations in Sweden during this period. In Finland, Eliel Saarinen was influenced by Richardson.

== Dispersion ==
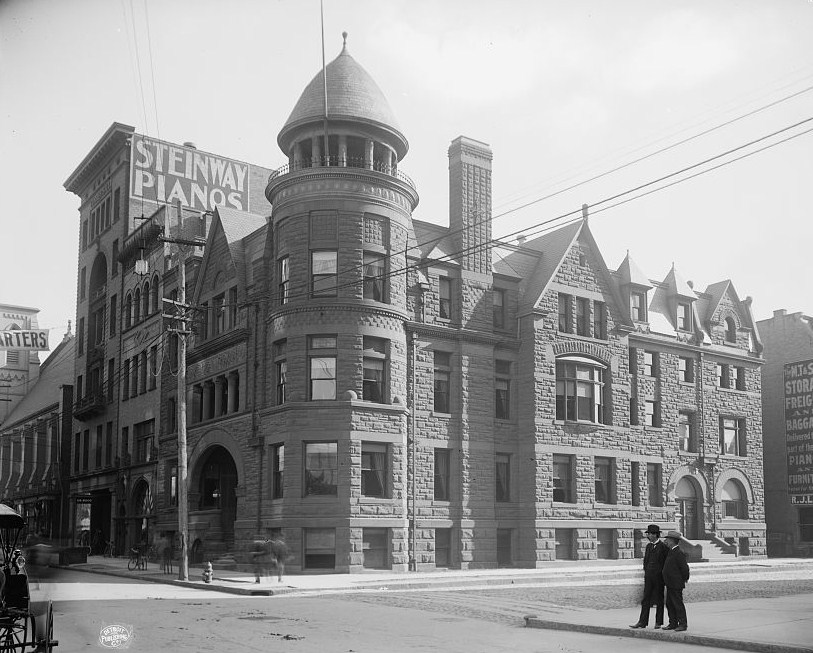
The original building for the Toledo Club in Toledo, Ohio in the 1900s

Research is underway to try to document the westward movement of the artisans and craftsmen, many of whom were immigrant Italians and Irish, who built in the Richardsonian Romanesque tradition. The style began in the East, in and around Boston, where Richardson built the influential Trinity Church on Copley Square. As the style was losing favor in the East, it was gaining popularity further west. Stone carvers and masons trained in the Richardsonian manner appear to have taken the style west, until it died out in the early decades of the 20th century.

As an example, four small bank buildings were built in Richardsonian Romanesque style in Osage County, Oklahoma, during 1904–1911: the Osage Bank of Fairfax, Bank of Hominy, Bank of Burbank, and Bank of Bigheart.

Another example of the Richardsonian Romanesque style and its westward spread is the former City Building (now the Clark County Heritage Center) of Springfield, Ohio, built in 1890. The building was designed by local architect Charles Cregar, whose style reflected the tastes of many of the town's settlers that came westward on the National Road from the East Coast, stopping in Springfield when federal funding for constructing the road ran out in 1838.

== See also ==
- H. H. Richardson Historic District of North Easton
