= PEG 400 =

Polyethylene glycol
- Polyethylene glycol

Names
- IUPAC name Polyethylene glycol

Identifiers
CAS Number	25322-68-3
ChemSpider	none
UNII	B697894SGQ

Properties
Chemical formula	C_{2n}H_{4n+2}O_{n+1}, n = 8.2 to 9.1
Molar mass	380-420 g/mol
Density	1.128 g/cm^{3}
Melting point	4 to 8 °C (39 to 46 °F; 277 to 281 K)
Viscosity	90.0 cSt at 25 °C, 7.3 cSt at 99 °C

Hazards
Flash point	238 °C (460 °F; 511 K)
- Lethal dose or concentration (LD, LC)
LD_{50} (median dose)	30 mL/kg, orally in rats
- Except where otherwise noted, data are given for materials in their standard state (at 25 °C [77 °F], 100 kPa). verify (what is ?) Infobox references

PEG 400 (polyethylene glycol 400) is a low-molecular-weight grade of polyethylene glycol. It is a clear, colorless, viscous liquid. Due in part to its low toxicity, PEG 400 is widely used in a variety of pharmaceutical formulations.

== Chemical properties ==
PEG 400 is strongly hydrophilic. The partition coefficient of PEG 400 between hexane and water is 0.000015 (log$P = -4.8$), indicating that when PEG 400 is mixed with water and hexane, there are only 15 parts of PEG400 in the hexane layer per 1 million parts of PEG 400 in the water layer.

PEG 400 is soluble in water, acetone, alcohols, benzene, glycerin, glycols, and aromatic hydrocarbons. It is not miscible with aliphatic hydrocarbons nor diethyl ether. Therefore, reaction products can be extracted from the reaction media with those solvents.
