= Renaissance Wax =

Wax polish used in antique restoration

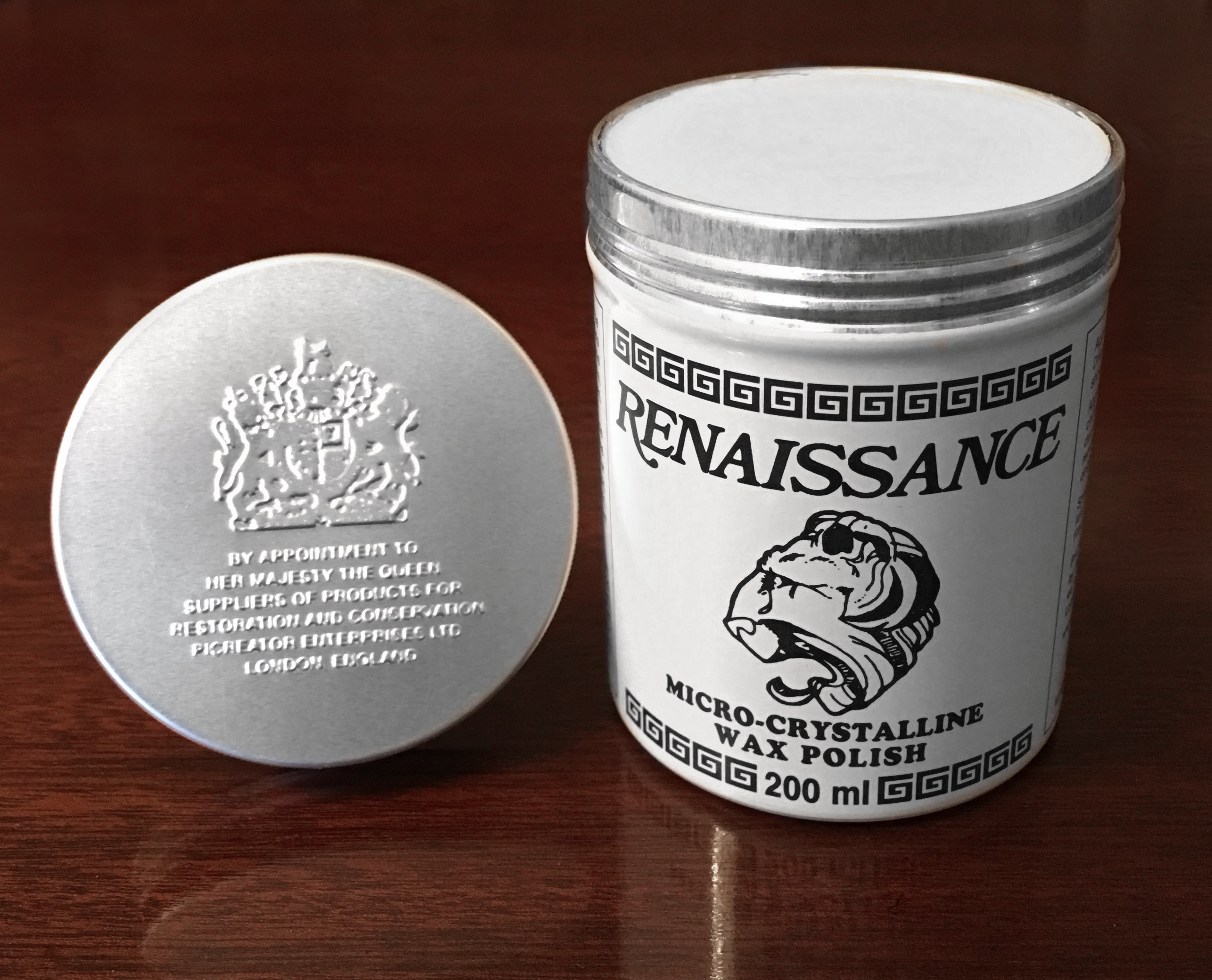
Renaissance Wax 200ml Can

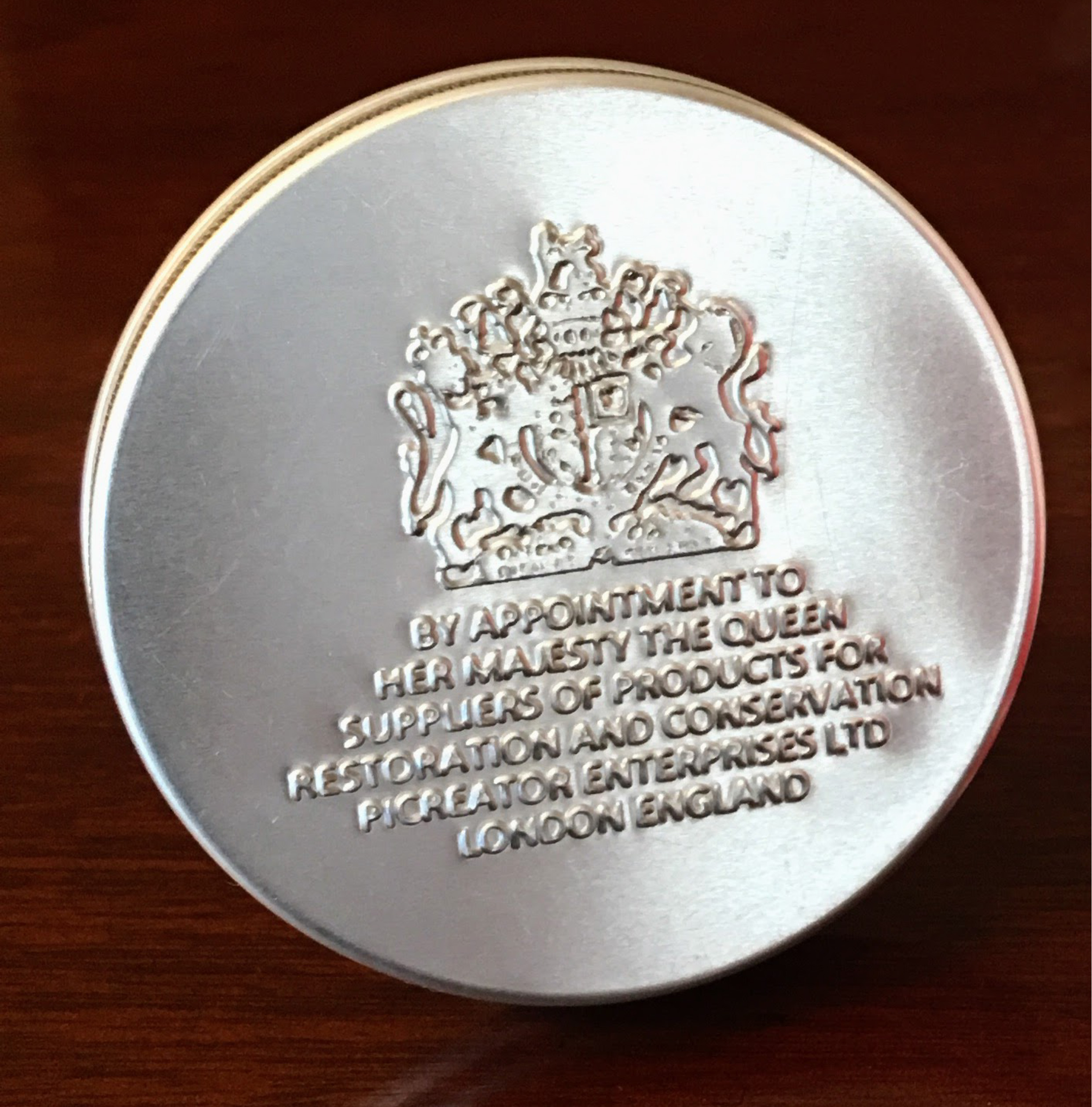
Lid of Renaissance Wax can, embossed with a royal warrant from Queen Elizabeth.

Renaissance Wax is a brand of microcrystalline wax polish used in antique restoration and museum conservation around the world. Commonly used to polish and conserve metal objects, it is also used on gemstones and organic materials such as wood, ivory, and tortoiseshell. The product is sometimes used by reenactors to protect armor and weapons. Waxes are more protective and longer-lasting than oil, especially for swords and helmets that are frequently touched by human hands. It has recently been introduced in the world of guitar building, as a finish that protects and gives colour to the wood.

Wax coatings for conservation are most widely, and least controversially, applied to metals. This has several objectives: to produce a barrier that excludes moisture and oxygen from the metal surface, to preclude the introduction of contaminating elements by handling, and to provide a protective layer over anti-corrosion undercoatings.

Microcrystalline waxes used on ethnographic metal objects are discouraged, as they may require extensive treatment for removal.

Renaissance Wax is used to protect metals such as silver, brass and copper from tarnishing, on collections of all types of metals (old coins, locks and keys, arms and armour both original and replica), on both the wood and metal surfaces of vintage cars and musical instruments, on bronze sculptures inside the home and outside exposed to the elements, on marble and granite worktops to prevent staining and on smooth leather items.

== Formulation ==
Renaissance Wax was developed in the British Museum Research Laboratory by Dr A E A Werner in the late 1950s. It is manufactured by Picreator Enterprises Ltd.

Earlier wax polishes based on beeswax and carnauba wax either contained acids or became acidic over time. Renaissance Wax is based on more stable microcrystalline waxes refined from crude oil.

Renaissance Wax contains polyethylene waxes. Some other microcrystalline waxes intended for conservation use do not contain these.

== Use ==
The wax is evenly and lightly applied over the surface, then lightly buffed with a smooth lint-free cloth or brush.

=== Application over other coatings ===
Renaissance Wax applied over Klucel G or a similar consolidant used for retarding red rot in leather bookbindings can create an irremovable white residue if applied too heavily. Use of a different wax, such as SC6000, is recommended for leather.

Renaissance Wax is also commonly used in the preservation of bronze and copper coins. The wax seals the coins and helps prevent deterioration from moisture and air exposure. It may also help prevent the onset of the chloride-related corrosion commonly called bronze disease, although it won't arrest this once started.

Conservation of metals may also involve the application of an undercoat such as Incralac followed by the application of Renaissance Wax.

=== Accumulation of dust and lint ===
Wax coatings, in general, may accumulate dust and lint.

In one example where a Benin bust made from a copper-iron alloy had been coated with multiple materials including this wax, the polyethylene component required a higher-temperature solvent for removal than the rest of the wax.

== See also ==
- Conservation-restoration of cultural heritage
