= Red rot =

Degradation process found in vegetable-tanned leather

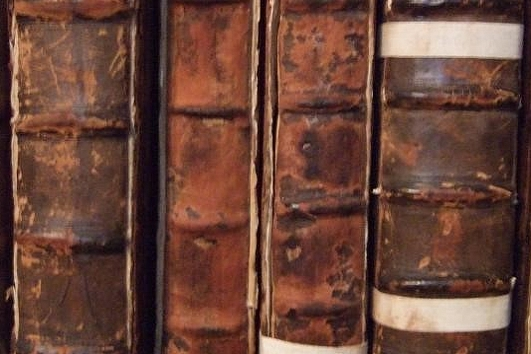
Leather bindings exhibiting red rot

Red rot is a degradation process found in vegetable-tanned leather.

Red rot is caused by prolonged storage or exposure to high relative humidity, environmental pollution, and high temperature. In particular, red rot occurs at pH values of 4.2 to 4.5. Sulfur dioxide converts to sulfurous acid which forms hydrogen peroxide. The peroxide combines with residual tannins in the leather to oxidize proteins, creating ammonium sulfate and ammonium bisulfate.

Red rot is also caused by problems in the tanning or in the bookbinding. In the tanning examples are: sulfuric acid residue, use of contaminated water and incomplete tanning. The bookbinding process can cause red rot when acids and bases are used when coloring the leather.

The decay manifests as a characteristic powdering of the leather's surface, along with structural weakness through loss, delamination, and a felt-like consistency.

The damage caused by red rot is irreversible. However, its spread, if caused by environmental factors, may be retarded by an application of a consolidant (such as Klucel G) coated with a sealer (such as Renaissance Wax).

The progress of red rot can be stopped or slowed with a treatment of aluminium alkoxide solution, which increases the pH value and becomes (in the presence of water) a buffering inorganic aluminium salt in the leather.
