= Lauryl methyl gluceth-10 hydroxypropyl dimonium chloride =

Names
- IUPAC name D-Glucopyranose, methyl ether, ethoxylated, 3-(N-dodecyl-N,N-dimethylammonio)-2-hydroxypropyl ethers (10 mol EO average molar ratio)
- Other names Lauryl methyl gluceth-10-hydroxypropyldimonium chloride, Glucquat 125

Identifiers
CAS Number	123005-57-2
ChemSpider	none
ECHA InfoCard	100.121.832
EC Number	602-914-0

Properties
Appearance	Pale, yellow liquid
- Except where otherwise noted, data are given for materials in their standard state (at 25 °C [77 °F], 100 kPa). verify (what is ?) Infobox references

Lauryl methyl gluceth-10 hydroxypropyl dimonium chloride is an ingredient in some types of soaps and personal care products. It is used as a substantive conditioning humectant. This chemical is a type of methyl glucoside derivative, which has been modified by ethoxylation and quaternization. A synthetic pathway for lauryl methyl gluceth-10 hydroxypropyldimonium chloride and other methyl glucoside humectants has been outlined in trade literature.

Lauryl methyl gluceth-10 hydroxypropyldimonium chloride is listed as a trade-named raw material, Glucquat 125, in cosmetic and toiletry products.
