= Leather dressing =

Leather conservation formula

== History ==
Over time, leather can become dry, friable/powdery, brittle, and/or hard as it degrades. Leather dressing was a product intended to impart fats/oils into the leather and restore shine, flexibility, improve strength, and slow deterioration. Countless studies over many years have shown that they are ineffective, yet active intervention by well-meaning custodians of books and other leather objects often feels better than doing nothing, and these products can still be found in use and even sold by conservation suppliers.

== Impact ==
Leather dressing has never been shown to make a positive impact in the categories desired, except for an improvement in short-term appearance: there is no longterm preservation argument to be made for its use. It may do no harm, but it has great potential to be over-applied, and to cause stickiness on the surface, swell and deform the leather, dissolve and mobilise components of the leather, encourage mould growth, stiffen, and discolour the leather. It can also lead to spue, where fats in the leather coalesce and crystallise as white spots on the surface.

== Types and recipes ==
=== British Museum leather dressing ===
The recipe for British Museum leather dressing, also called Pliantine, was first published in 1946 by Dr. J. J. Plenderleith, chemist at the British Museum.

The basic formulation is:

20 g	anhydrous lanolin
30 ml	cedar oil (microbicide)
15 g	beeswax (optional)
330 ml	X-4 solvent or hexane (solvent)

The first three ingredients are heated together, then added to the cold solvent and allowed to cool while constantly stirring. Care should be exercised, as the solvents are highly flammable and have low boiling points.

There is some variation in the formula. Sometimes 60% of the lanolin was replaced by neatsfoot oil. Other nonpolar solvents could be used, such as Shellsol T.

=== Other leather dressings ===
- Bavon ASAK APB: alkenyl succinic acid derivative, soluble in white spirit and 1,1,1-trichloroethane
- Connolly's Leather Food: lanolin, beeswax, water, morpholine, white spirit
- Plexisol: marketed for leather with red rot. Polyacrylate resin to be diluted with 1,1,1-trichloroethane
- As recommended by Bernard Middleton: 60% neat's-foot-oil, 40 % lanolin, with note that it does not prevent chemical deterioration but keeps the leather supple.

== Application on books ==
Sources often suggest cleaning the leather first, sometimes with castile or saddle soap, which is a much higher pH than degraded leather and must be applied with water. It may clean dirt off the surface but is likely to cause other dirt to penetrate further, and the high pH leads to a lowering of the leather's shrinkage temperature—a measure of its stability. A solution of 7% potassium lactate may be applied first, especially with British Museum dressing, and generally left to dry for 2 days first before then applying dressing. Sometimes a shellac was added after the dressing as well.
