= Microcrystalline wax =

Type of wax with fine crystals

Microcrystalline waxes are a type of wax produced by de-oiling petrolatum, as part of the petroleum refining process. In contrast to the more familiar paraffin wax which contains mostly unbranched alkanes, microcrystalline wax contains a higher percentage of isoparaffinic (branched) hydrocarbons and naphthenic hydrocarbons. It is characterized by the fineness of its crystals in contrast to the larger crystal of paraffin wax. It consists of high molecular weight saturated aliphatic hydrocarbons. It is generally darker, more viscous, denser, tackier and more elastic than paraffin waxes, and has a higher molecular weight and melting point. The elastic and adhesive characteristics of microcrystalline waxes are related to the non-straight chain components which they contain. Typical microcrystalline wax crystal structure is small and thin, making them more flexible than paraffin wax. It is commonly used in cosmetic formulations.

Microcrystalline waxes when produced by wax refiners are typically produced to meet a number of ASTM specifications. These include congeal point (ASTM D938), needle penetration (ASTM D1321), color (ASTM D6045), and viscosity (ASTM D445). Microcrystalline waxes can generally be put into two categories: "laminating" grades and "hardening" grades. The laminating grades typically have a melting point of 140–175 °F (60–80 °C) and needle penetration of 25 or above. The hardening grades will range from about 175–200 °F (80–93 °C), and have a needle penetration of 25 or below. Color in both grades can range from brown to white, depending on the degree of processing done at the refinery level.

Microcrystalline waxes are derived from the refining of the heavy distillates from lubricant oil production. This by-product must then be de-oiled at a wax refinery. Depending on the end use and desired specification, the product may then have its odor removed and color removed (which typically starts as a brown or dark yellow). This is usually done by means of a filtration method or by hydro-treating the wax material.

== Industries and applications ==
Microcrystalline wax is often used in industries such as tire and rubber, candles, adhesives, corrugated board, cosmetics, castings, and others. Refineries may use blending facilities to combine paraffin and microcrystalline waxes; this is prevalent in the tire and rubber industries.

Microcrystalline waxes have considerable application in the custom making of jewelry and small sculptures. Different formulations produce waxes from those soft enough to be molded by hand to those hard enough to be carved with rotary tools. The melted wax can be cast to make multiple copies that are further carved with details. Jewelry suppliers sell wax molded into the basic forms of rings as well as details that can be heat welded together and tubes and sheets for cutting and building the wax models. Rings may be attached to a wax "tree" so that many can be cast in one pouring.

A brand of microcrystalline wax, Renaissance Wax, is also used extensively in museum and conservation settings for protection and polishing of antique woods, ivory, gemstones, and metal objects. It was developed by The British Museum in the 1950s to replace the potentially unstable natural waxes that were previously used such as beeswax and carnauba.

Microcrystalline waxes are excellent materials to use when modifying the crystalline properties of paraffin wax. The microcrystalline wax has significantly more branching of the carbon chains that are the backbone of paraffin wax. This is useful when some desired functional changes in the paraffin are needed, such as flexibility, higher melt point, and increased opacity. They are also used as slip agents in printing ink.

Microcrystalline wax is used in such sports as ice hockey, skiing and snowboarding. It is applied to the friction tape of an ice hockey stick to prevent degradation of the tape due to water destroying the glue on the tape and also to increase control of the hockey puck due to the wax’s adhesive quality. It is also applied to the underside of skis and snowboards as glide wax to reduce friction and increase the gliding ability of the board, making it easier to control; stickier grades of kick or grip wax are also used on cross-country skis to allow the ski to alternately grip the snow and slip across it as the skier shifts their weight while striding.

Microcrystalline wax was used in the final phases of the restoration of the Cosmatesque pavement, Westminster Abbey, London.

== Use in petrolatum ==
Microcrystalline wax is also a key component in the manufacture of petrolatum. The branched structure of the carbon chain backbone allows oil molecules to be incorporated into the crystal lattice structure. The desired properties of the petrolatum can be modified by using microcrystalline wax bases of different congeal points (ASTM D938) and needle penetration (ASTM D1321).

However, key industries that utilize petrolatum, such as the personal care, cosmetic, and candle industries, have pushed for more materials that are considered "green" and based on renewable resources. As an alternative, hybrid petrolatum can be used. Hybrid petrolatum utilizes a complex mixture of vegetable oils and waxes and combines them with petroleum and micro wax-based technologies. This allows a formulator to incorporate higher percentages of renewable resources while maintaining the beneficial properties of the petrolatum.
