= Scotia Chalk Building =

- U.S. National Register of Historic Places
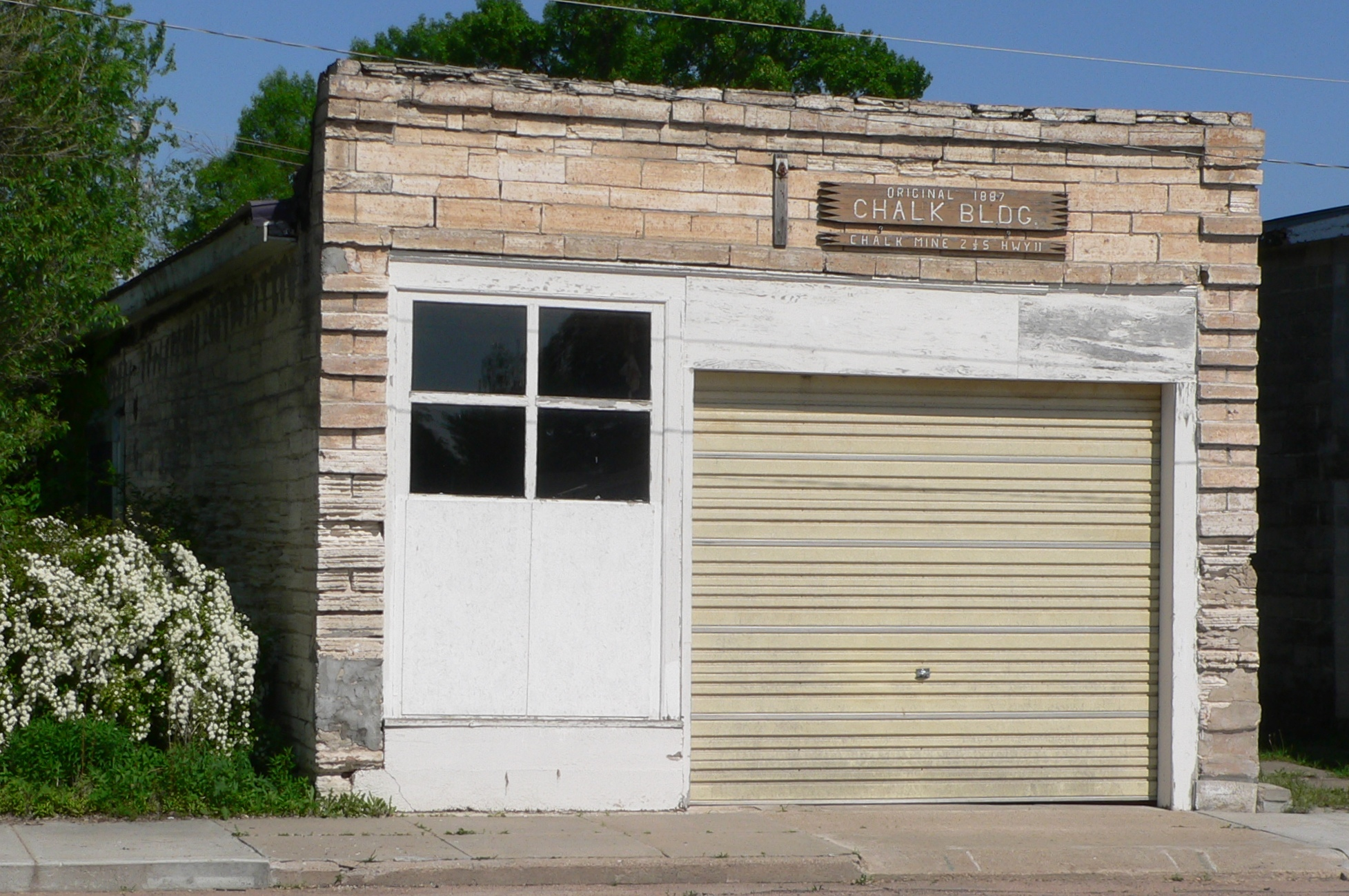
- Photographed in 2010

- Location within Nebraska Location within the United States
- Location: Off NE 22, Scotia, Nebraska
- Coordinates: 41°27′54″N 98°42′9″W
- Area: less than one acre
- Built: 1887
- Built by: Wright, Ed
- NRHP reference No.: 79003686
- Added to NRHP: October 11, 1979

The Scotia Chalk Building, located off Nebraska Highway 22 in Scotia in Greeley County, Nebraska, was built in 1887. Also known as the Ed Wright Building, it was listed on the National Register of Historic Places in 1979.

The building was a general store built by Ed Wright in 1887 using chalk taken from Happy Jack Peak, a chalk bluff on the North Loup River near Scotia. Ed Wright, an early settler of Scotia, had begun mining chalk from the bluff in 1878.

In 2010, only about half of the building which was in place in 1978 remained, based on photographs.
