= Markell Carter =

American gridiron football player (born 1989)

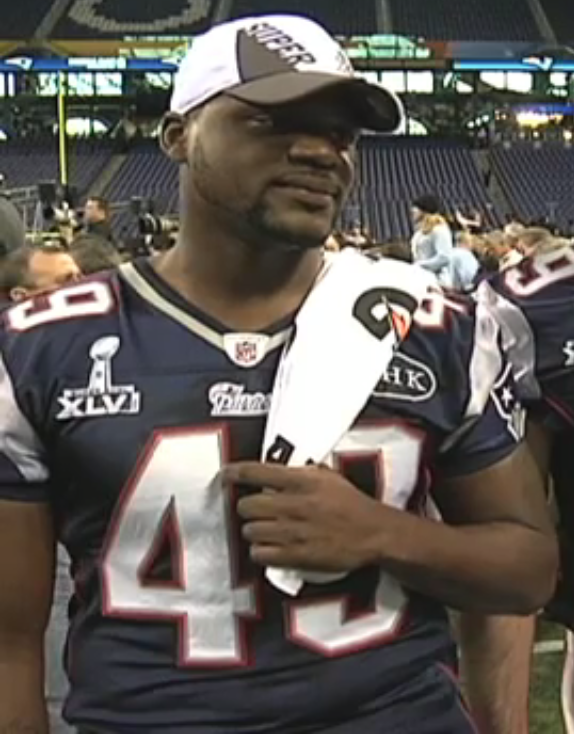
- Carter at Super Bowl XLVI media day

No. 85, 95, 88
- Position: Linebacker/Defensive end

Personal information
- Born: July 29, 1989 (age 37); Bartlesville, Oklahoma, U.S.
- Listed height: 6 ft 4 in (1.93 m)
- Listed weight: 245 lb (111 kg)

Career information
- High school: Bartlesville (OK)
- College: Central Arkansas
- NFL draft: 2011: 6th round, 194th overall pick

Career history
- New England Patriots (2011–2012)*; Calgary Stampeders (2013)*; Orlando Predators (2013)*; Pittsburgh Power (2014)*; Orlando Predators (2014)*; Colorado Ice (2014); Montreal Alouettes (2015)
- * Offseason or practice squad member only
- Stats at Pro Football Reference
- Stats at CFL.ca (archive)
- Stats at ArenaFan.com

Markell Carter (born July 29, 1989) is an American former professional football linebacker. He was selected by the New England Patriots in the sixth round of the 2011 NFL draft.

== Early life ==
Markell was born in Bartlesville, Oklahoma, on July 29, 1989, and later graduated from Bartlesville High School. He then attended Central Arkansas and played football for the UCA Bears.

== Professional career ==
Pre-draft measurables
Height	Weight	40-yard dash	10-yard split	20-yard split	20-yard shuttle	Three-cone drill	Vertical jump	Broad jump	Bench press
6 ft 4 3/8 in (1.94 m)	252 lb (114 kg)	4.70 s	1.71 s	2.74 s	4.45 s	7.43 s	35.5 in (0.90 m)	10 ft 1 in (3.07 m)	17 reps
All values from Pro Day

=== New England Patriots ===
After the 2011 NFL Lockout, Carter finally signed with the Patriots and reported to training camp as one of the first two rookies to sign with the team along with tight end Lee Smith. He was released during final cuts but almost immediately re-signed to the practice squad. He was again released on June 7, 2012.

=== Calgary Stampeders ===
Carter signed with the Calgary Stampeders on March 11, 2013. In June, 2013, the Stampeders released Carter before training camp opened.

=== Orlando Predators (first stint) ===
Carter was assigned to the Orlando Predators of the Arena Football League on July 25, 2013. He was with the Predators during their playoff game, but did not play. After the season, his contract expired making him a free agent.

=== Pittsburgh Power ===
Carter was assigned to the Pittsburgh Power on October 24, 2013.

=== Orlando Predators (second stint) ===
On February 6, 2014, Carter was traded to the Predators, along with Ben Ossai, for Prechae Rodriguez.

=== Colorado Ice ===
On March 12, 2014, Carter signed with the Colorado Ice of the Indoor Football League.

=== Montreal Alouettes ===
Carter was signed by the Montreal Alouettes on March 11, 2015. He spent the 2015 season on the injured list and practice roster. He re-signed with the Alouettes on February 15, 2016.
