= A. J. Parker =

American football player (born 1998)

No. 41, 37
- Position: Cornerback

Personal information
- Born: February 15, 1998 (age 28); Bartlesville, Oklahoma, U.S.
- Listed height: 5 ft 11 in (1.80 m)
- Listed weight: 185 lb (84 kg)

Career information
- High school: Bartlesville
- College: Kansas State (2016–2020)
- NFL draft: 2021: undrafted

Career history
- Detroit Lions (2021–2022); San Francisco 49ers (2023)*; Carolina Panthers (2023)
- * Offseason or practice squad member only

Career NFL statistics
- Total tackles: 65
- Forced fumbles: 1
- Pass deflections: 7
- Interceptions: 1
- Stats at Pro Football Reference

Arlando Dwayne Parker Jr. (born February 15, 1998) is an American former professional football player who was a cornerback in the National Football League (NFL). He played college football for the Kansas State Wildcats.

== College career ==
Parker played at Kansas State University for five seasons, redshirting his true freshman year with the Wildcats. He finished his collegiate career with 144 tackles, 8.5 tackles for loss, six interceptions and 24 passes defended in 40 games played.

== Professional career ==
Pre-draft measurables
Height	Weight	Arm length	Hand span	40-yard dash	10-yard split	20-yard split	20-yard shuttle	Three-cone drill	Vertical jump	Broad jump	Bench press
5 ft 11 1/4 in (1.81 m)	182 lb (83 kg)	30 5/8 in (0.78 m)	7 3/8 in (0.19 m)	4.53 s	1.62 s	2.62 s	4.37 s	7.02 s	33.5 in (0.85 m)	9 ft 9 in (2.97 m)	10 reps
All values from Pro Day

=== Detroit Lions ===
Parker signed with the Detroit Lions as an undrafted free agent on May 3, 2021. He made the Lions' 53-man roster out of training camp. He was placed on injured reserve on November 24, 2021. He was activated on December 18.

On August 30, 2022, Parker was waived by the Lions and signed to the practice squad the next day. He was promoted to the active roster on October 8, 2022. He was waived on November 11, 2022, and re-signed to the practice squad.

=== San Francisco 49ers ===
On January 16, 2023, Parker signed a reserve/future contract with the San Francisco 49ers. He was placed on injured reserve on August 29, 2023. He was released on September 5.

=== Carolina Panthers ===
On November 22, 2023, Parker was signed to the Carolina Panthers practice squad. He signed a reserve/future contract on January 8, 2024. He was waived on May 10, 2024.
