= BVO =

BVO may refer to:

- Brominated vegetable oil, a food additive
- Bartlesville Municipal Airport, Oklahoma (IATA code BVO)
- Bundesverdienstorden, the Order of Merit of the Federal Republic of Germany
