= Louis Skurcenski =

American basketball player

Louis Skurcenski, Jr.
- Skurcenski from 1965 Phillips 66ers

Personal information
- Born: January 29, 1943 Braddock, Pennsylvania
- Died: December 22, 1998 (aged 55) Bartlesville, Oklahoma

Career information
- High school: Zelienople (Zelienople, Pennsylvania)
- College: Westminster College (1960–1964)
- NBA draft: 1964: 5th round, 40th overall pick
- Drafted by: Philadelphia 76ers
- Position: Forward

Career history
- 1964–1967: Phillips 66ers

Career highlights
- NAIA All American (1964); Olympic Trials (1964); Westminster College Varsity "W" Athlete of the Year (1964); Lawrence County Historical Society Hall of Fame (1996); Westminster College Sports Hall of Fame (1988)
- Stats at Basketball Reference

Louis Skurcenski, Jr. (January 29, 1943 – December 22, 1998) was born in Braddock, PA to the late Louis Skurcenski, Sr. and Margaret Hornick. He was an All-American college basketball player at Westminster College, playing 4 seasons from 1960 to 1964, including the 1962 team that was voted the No. 1 small college team in America. His career stats and records are impressive. In his 4 year career, he scored 1,182 points (#25 all time), 608 field goals (#3 all time), 20 rebounds in 1 game (tied for #6 all time), 289 rebounds in 1 season (#2 all time), and 958 career rebounds (#2 all time).

== Education ==
He graduated from Westminster in 1964 with a bachelor of science degree in chemistry, toured South America for four weeks on a Goodwill Tour sponsored by the U.S. State Department, and participated in the 1964 Olympic Trials with 93 top collegiate, A.A.U. and Armed Forces players at St. John's Alumni Hall in Jamaica, Queens. Notable names who participated in the Olympic trials included Bill Bradly, Larry Brown, Walt Hazzard, Lucious Jackson and head coach Hank Iba.

== Family ==
He married Stephanie Solomon and had two children - Jason and Amy.

== Career ==
He was drafted in the 5th round (40th overall pick) by the Philadelphia 76ers. After deciding not to continue playing for 76ers, he joined the Pittsburgh Pipers of the American Basketball Association (ABA) in 1967 to play with the likes of Connie Hawkins, Tom Kerwin, and Art Heyman. However, he was not offered a no cut contract so he moved back to Oklahoma to play for the Phillips 66ers in Bartlesville, Oklahoma. He played with teammates such as Jim Kerwin, Bill Kusleika, Bobby Rascoe, and Darel Carrier. Lou worked in the Chemical Research Division of the Phillips Petroleum Company for 34 years before his retirement.

He received honors, including Westminster College Varsity "W" Athlete of the Year (1964) and induction into the Lawrence County Historical Society Hall of Fame (1996), Westminster College Sports Hall of Fame (1988) and the Bartlesville Sports Commission Hall of Fame (2023).

Lou was a supporter of youth sports in Bartlesville and spent time as a coach, mentor, volunteer, and fan. He tutored and encouraged students in the pursuit of science and business. Due to the generosity of family and friends to honor "Big Lou", memorial scholarships were established at Westminster College and Bartlesville High School to provide funds for students who embodied the qualities of a leader (integrity, good sportsmanship and a positive attitude) to further their education in college.

== Death ==
Lou died of cancer in December 1998 at the age of 55 and his funeral was on December 24, 1998, in Bartlesville, Oklahoma. He received numerous honors, including induction into the Lawrence County Historical Society Hall of Fame (1996).
