= Frank and Jane Phillips House =

Historic house in Oklahoma, United States

- U.S. National Register of Historic Places
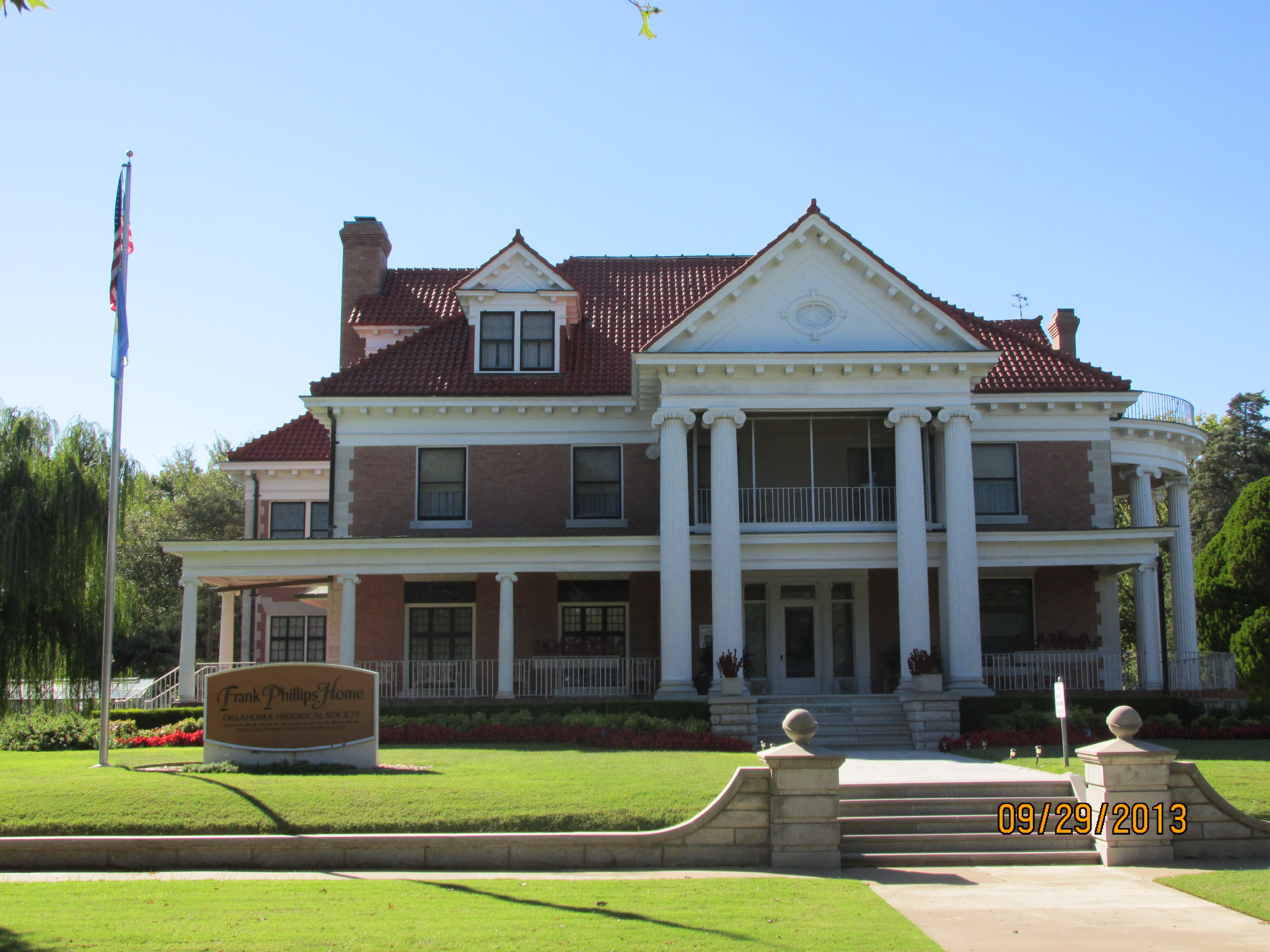

- Location within Oklahoma Location within the United States
- Location: 1107 S. Cherokee Ave., Bartlesville, Oklahoma
- Coordinates: 36°44′31″N 95°58′30″W
- Area: less than one acre
- Built: 1908
- Architect: Walter Everman
- Architectural style: Classical Revival
- NRHP reference No.: 75001576
- Added to NRHP: March 13, 1975

The Frank and Jane Phillips House is a historic house in Bartlesville, Oklahoma, United States, that is listed on the National Register of Historic Places. Designed by Walter Everman, it was built in 1908–1909 in the Greek Revival style and was the residence of the oil magnate Frank Phillips and his wife Jane. The house is a three-story building with brick walls and a tile roof, and it includes 26 rooms. The estate also has several outbuildings.

The Philips family lived in the house until Frank and Jane's respective deaths in 1950 and 1948. Afterward, the Phillipses' granddaughter Elizabeth Irwin inherited the property. In 1973, Irwin donated the house to the Oklahoma Historical Society for use as a museum. The Frank Phillips Foundation took over in 2017.

== Description ==
The Frank and Jane Phillips House is located at 1107 South Cherokee Avenue in Bartlesville, Oklahoma, United States. It was designed by Walter Everman in the Greek Revival or neoclassical style. The house is three stories high with a basement.

The estate has eight other features, all but two of which are contributing resources to the house's National Register of Historic Places (NRHP) designation. A low cast stone wall dating from 1908 surrounds the property, with openings for driveways and walkways at the north end. There is a metal water tower dating from 1926 and a garage, single-story gardener's cottage, and a single-story potting shed dating from 1930. A greenhouse was built in 1946 by Frank Phillips, the house's original owner, for his wife. The non-contributing properties are a gazebo dating from 1954 and a sign dating from 1976.

=== Exterior ===
The foundation is made of stone, and the facade above is made of pinkish brick with stone quoins. The main elevation of the facade is to the south, and has an asymmetrically arranged two-story entry portico and a smaller covered porch. The portico consists of fluted Ionic columns, which support a pediment with a window; under it is an elaborate doorway with Ionic pilasters and glass transoms and sidelights. The porch has a flat roof and Ionic columns, and the south elevation is topped by a cornice with dentils. The second floor has a sleeping porch.

The north elevation has a curved portico supported by Ionic columns; it is topped by a cornice and a balustrade. A secondary entry protrudes from the north elevation, and there are French doors on the third floor. The rear elevation has multiple expansions (including a 1917 southwest wing and a further annex built in the 1930s with guestrooms, kitchen, and butler quarters). The rear elevation has roofs of several designs, and there are multiple types of windows and porches. The building's primary roof is a hip roof with dark red clay tiles. There are dormers protruding from the roof, with cornices and pediments.

=== Interior ===
Inside, the mansion is divided into 26 rooms, spread across four floors. The basement contains mechanical systems, in addition to a storm shelter and a bomb shelter (the latter located under a driveway). The first floor has communal areas—including a staircase, sunroom, library, and living and dining rooms—along with service areas such as kitchen. The second and third floors have bedrooms and bathrooms; the master bedrooms are on the second floor. Also on the third floor are a recreational room and the former butler's quarters.

== History ==
The house was built for the oil magnate Frank Phillips, who was born in Nebraska in 1873 and came to the Indian Territory (later Oklahoma) in the early 1900s after he learned of the discovery of oil there. Phillips approved plans for a new house in Bartlesville in May 1908; it was the first to be built in the Pemberton Heights neighborhood of Bartlesville. The house was completed by 1909, though the National Park Service cited the house as having been finished the previous year.

The house underwent two renovations and expansion during the Phillips family's occupancy. The first was in 1917, when the southwest wing was added, with a sunroom on the first floor and children's rooms on the second floor. Robert Phillips, one of the couple's grandchildren, remembered that the sunroom was used for eating breakfast. In 1925, the Phillipses' son John built a house across the street at 1110 South Cherokee Avenue. The house underwent a second renovation in 1930, when the third floor was added. Frank and Jane Philips lived in the house until their respective deaths in 1950 and 1948. Both their funerals were hosted in the house's library. After Frank's death, the Phillipses' granddaughter Elizabeth Irwin inherited the house and moved in.

In 1973, Irwin donated the house to the Oklahoma Historical Society (OHS). Under the terms of Irwin's gift, the OHS was to open the house as a museum; if the society were unable to operate the house, the city of Bartlesville was to take over. The OHS renovated the house to restore design details from 1930. The house opened to the public in November 1973 on the centennial of Frank Phillips's birth. The museum retains the house's original furniture, as well as objects that the family owned, including books and a grandfather clock. It also includes replicas of clothing and headdresses given to the Phillipses by the Osage Nation, who made Frank Phillips an honorary tribal member.

The Phillips House was added to the National Register of Historic Places in 1975. The garage's lower level became an interpretive center in 1997, and the second-floor sleeping porch was renovated in 2000. By the 2010s, the OHS was unable to keep operating the house. The Frank Phillips Foundation, which operates Phillips's other house Woolaroc, took over in 2017.

== See also ==
- National Register of Historic Places listings in Washington County, Oklahoma

== Sources ==
- National Register of Historic Places Inventory/Nomination: Frank Phillips Home (Report). National Park Service. 1975.
