= Frank Phillips (oilman) =

American businessman (1873–1950)

- Born: Frank Freeman Phillips; November 28, 1873; Scotia, Nebraska, U.S.
- Died: August 23, 1950 (aged 76); Atlantic City, New Jersey, U.S.
- Spouse: Jane Gibson (m. 1898)

Frank Freeman Phillips (November 28, 1873 – August 23, 1950) was an American oilman who with his brother Lee Eldas Phillips co-founded the Phillips Petroleum Company in 1917. Phillips served as the company's president from 1917 to 1939 and as its chairman from 1939 to 1949.

== Early life and education ==
Frank Phillips was born on November 28, 1873, in Scotia, Nebraska where his parents Lucinda and Lewis Franklin Phillips, the county's first magistrate, had a farm. The family moved in 1874 to Conway, Iowa, a small farm in rural southwest Iowa, after a swarm of grasshoppers wreaked havoc on the farming region of Scotia. Frank had ten siblings, including two brothers with whom he later went into business. One notable family member is his younger brother Waite, who founded the Philmont Scout Ranch in New Mexico, a destination for thousands of Boy Scouts to backpack the mountains.

A few years later, the Phillips boy began his first occupational endeavor, hiring himself out to area farmers to dig potatoes for 10 cents a day (after completing his chores at home). It is said that Phillips liked the striped pants that barbers wore, particularly the uniform of the local barber so he wanted to be one. At age 14, Phillips dropped out of school and persuaded a barber in nearby Creston, Iowa, to take him on as an apprentice. His skill as a barber spread so that he was able to purchase Climax Barber Shop in no time. This was later called Climax Shaving Parlor, which was located in the basement of the Creston National Bank Building. Ten years later, Phillips owned all three barber shops in Creston. Aside from his barbershops, he was also selling baldness cures. When he reached 25, Phillips had already saved $75,000 from his sales schemes.

== Marriage and family ==
On February 18, 1897, Phillips married Jane Gibson, daughter of the bank president John Gibson, in Creston. Gibson was one of Phillips' customers. An account described how the elder Gibson promised not to get in the way of the pair's wedding if Phillips would give up barbering and join in the banking business. They had one son, John Gibson Phillips. Later they adopted two daughters, orphaned sisters whom they named Mary Francis and Sara Jane Phillips, where shortly after his wife died. They lived at the Frank and Jane Phillips House on South Cherokee Avenue in Bartlesville.

== Career ==
The bank's president, John Gibson, had considered Phillips an up-and-coming entrepreneur for some time. Shortly after Phillips married Jane Gibson, her father asked Phillips to join him in the bond business. Phillips began selling bonds in the New England states and the Chicago area.

During a stop in St. Louis en route back to Creston from Chicago in 1903, Phillips encountered C. B. Larabee, an old friend from Iowa who told him about the oil boom taking place in Oklahoma. He was serving as a Methodist missionary to the Osage Indians west of Bartlesville in Indian Territory. The area, which is now Osage County, Oklahoma, was rich in oil, and what proved to be a decades-long boom was just getting underway. Later that year, after Phillips and Gibson made two trips to Bartlesville, Phillips and his younger brother L. E. Phillips organized the Anchor Oil & Gas Company with Gibson's assistance. It had an authorized capital of $100,000 and the paid-in capital of $15,000.

Anchor opened an office in Bartlesville in 1905, secured a driller and drilled its first wildcat well, the Holland No. 1. The men struck oil on June 23, 1905. The brothers' second and third wells were dry holes, and they had barely enough money left to drill a fourth well, the Anna Anderson Number One. The Anna Anderson, completed September 6, 1905, was a gusher, and the successful well enabled the brothers to raise $100,000 through the sale of stock. The Anna Anderson was the first of 80 consecutive producing wells drilled for the brothers' company. The company was considered a pioneer in extracting value from natural gas during a period that considered it as a waste product in oil production.

Also in 1905, Frank and L. E. Phillips formed the Lewcinda Oil Company, with brother Waite. Waite, who preferred to work independently, soon left Lewcinda and formed his own bank and oil company, the Independent Oil & Gas Co. in Tulsa. In 1930 he merged it with Phillips Petroleum.

In late 1905, Frank and L.E. formed a bank, Citizens Bank and Trust, in Bartlesville with $50,000 capital. They also acquired a rival bank, the Bartlesville National Bank, and consolidating the two under the latter name. The bank later became the First National Bank of Bartlesville. Phillips still wanted to be a big-time banker. In 1916, he and L.E. decided that the boom-bust instability of the oil business was not for them. They made plans to open a bank in Kansas City that would be the cornerstone of a chain of banks throughout the Midwest. Before those plans could be carried out, the U.S. became involved in World War I.

With the price of oil quickly increasing from 40 cents a barrel to more than $1 a barrel, the brothers decided to consolidate their holdings in a single company, Phillips Petroleum Company. They incorporated on June 13, 1917, under Delaware law. The new company had assets of $3 million, 27 employees and leases throughout Oklahoma and Kansas.

Phillips once said to employees, to whom he was known as "Uncle Frank": "Work hard and demonstrate loyalty, and I'm a great guy to work for. Do neither, and there is no one worse." On another occasion, he said, "I am egotistical. I exercise the 'privilege and prestige of the office.' I'm bombastic, hard to get along with, an easy touch, a farm boy at heart, and conveniently hard of hearing. I'm just a sentimental old man. I'm tough. and I know it. I'm the boss, and don't let anybody try to question it."

Frank Phillips led the company as its president until age 65, when in 1939 he named Kenneth S. "Boots" Adams to succeed him. The company had reported record profits of $24.1 million the previous year. As Phillips turned over the presidency to Adams, he became the company's first chairman of the board, a position he held until he retired at the age of 76 in 1949, a year before his death. Jane Phillips, his wife of 50 years, died in 1948. He died while on a vacation in Atlantic City, New Jersey on August 23, 1950. He was buried beside his wife in the Phillips Family Mausoleum at Woolaroc, Phillips' ranch and country home in Osage County, Oklahoma, southwest of Bartlesville.

== Legacy and honors ==
- In 1944, Phillips had given 3,700-acre (15 km^{2}) acres of the 17,000-acre (69 km^{2}) ranch to the Frank Phillips Foundation and sold the remainder.
- Frank Phillips College, a community junior college in Borger, Texas, was named after him.
- Frank Phillips was inducted into the Oklahoma Hall of Fame in 1930.
- In 1975, the Frank and Jane Phillips House in Bartlesville was added to the National Register of Historic Places in Washington County, Oklahoma.
- In 2008, Woolaroc, the former home of Frank and Jane Phillips, was added to the National Register of Historic Places in Osage County, Oklahoma.
