= LaQuinta =

Historic house in Oklahoma, United States

- U.S. National Register of Historic Places
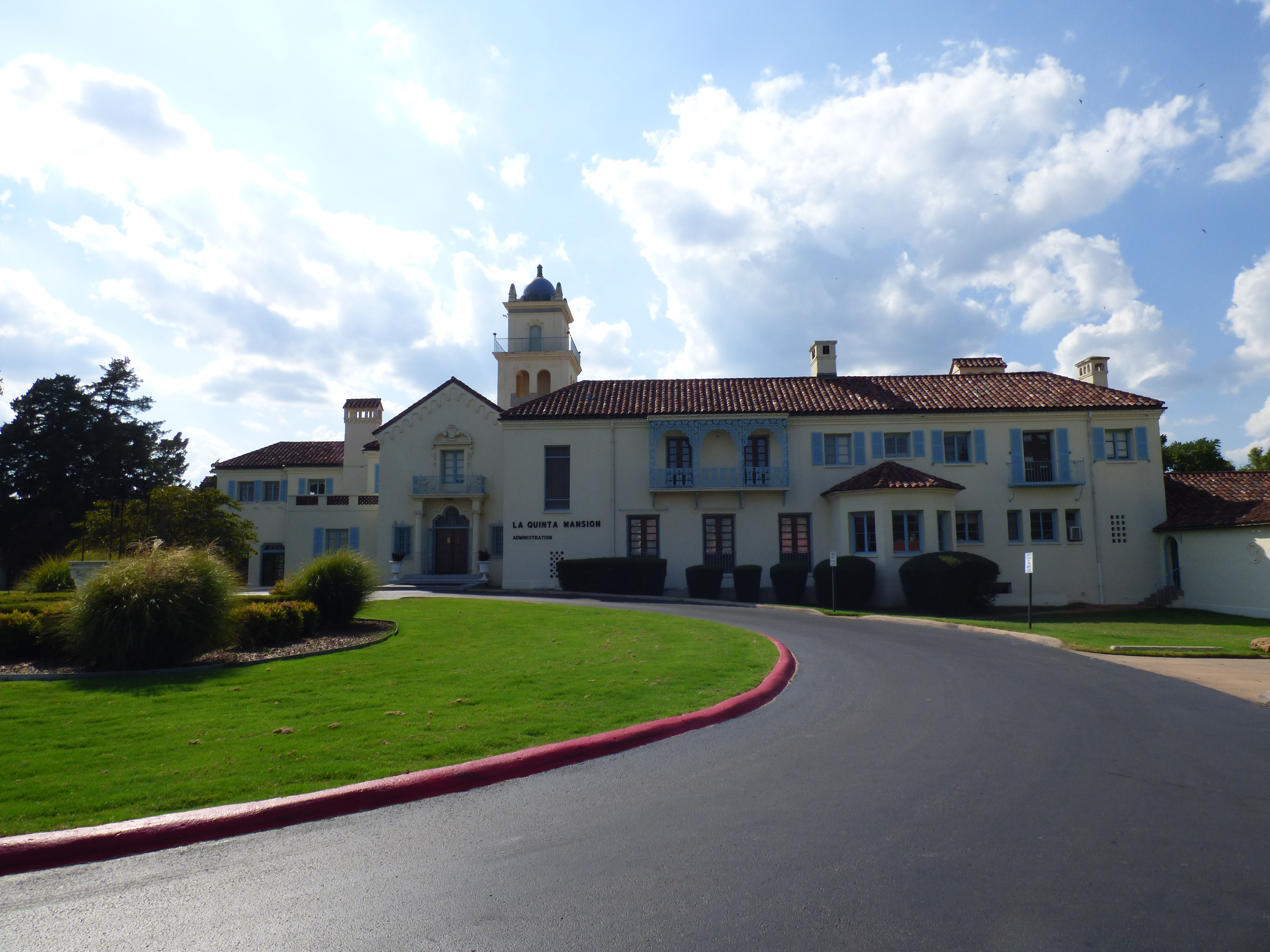
- LaQuinta Mansion, September 2018

- Location within Oklahoma Location within the United States
- Location: 2201 Silver Lake Road; Bartlesville, Oklahoma; United States
- Coordinates: 36°43′3″N 95°57′30″W
- Built: 1930
- Architect: Delk, Edward Buehler; Gier, Joe F.
- Architectural style: Mission/Spanish Revival
- NRHP reference No.: 82003716
- Added to NRHP: July 15, 1982

LaQuinta is a historic house in Bartlesville, Oklahoma, United States, that is listed on the National Register of Historic Places.

== Description ==
The house was built in 1932 for oil magnate H.V. Foster (1875-1939). The Spanish Colonial Revival house is located on the campus of Oklahoma Wesleyan University. The building was listed on the National Register of Historic Places on July 15, 1982.

La Quinta was designed in 1930 by noted Kansas City architect Edward Buehler Delk. About the same time, Delk designed a house that was built near La Quinta for Paul Fridjof Dahlgren, the brother of Mrs. H.V. Foster. The Dahlgren house is Spanish Revival in style. It is located to the south of La Quinta in the Country Club Terrace subdivision.

== See also ==
- National Register of Historic Places listings in Washington County, Oklahoma
