= Bartlesville Monthly Magazine =

American magazine

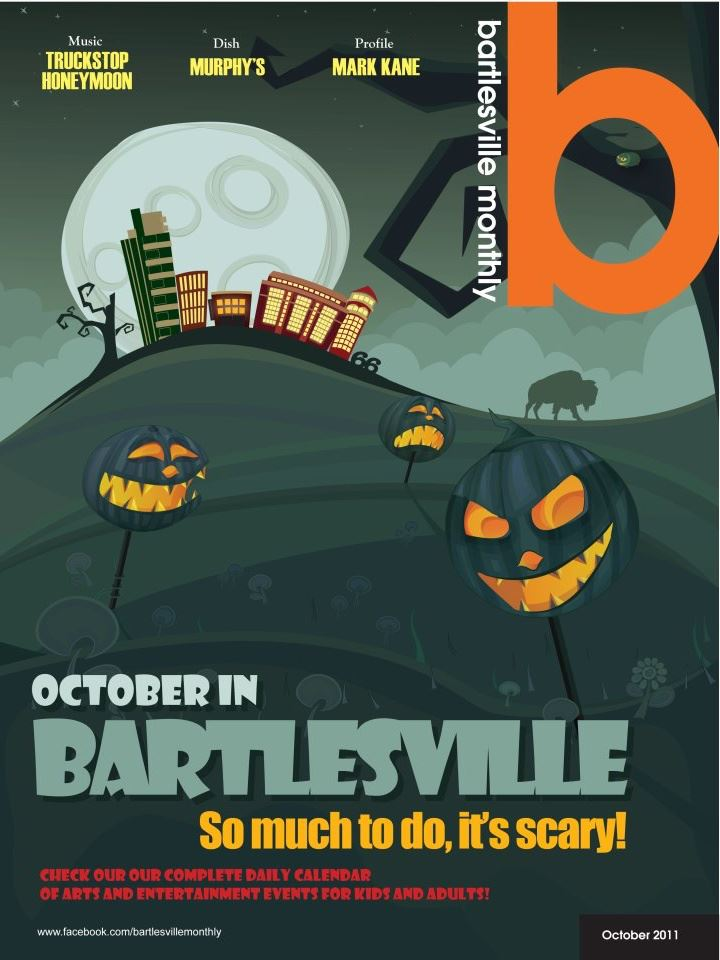
- October 2011 issue of Bartlesville Monthly Magazine
- Categories: Community magazine
- Frequency: Monthly
- Publisher: Brian Engel
- First issue: September 2011
- Company: Engel Publishing Co.
- Country: United States
- Language: English
- Website: https://www.bartlesvillemonthly.com/

Bartlesville Monthly Magazine is a free of charge community magazine based in Bartlesville, Oklahoma.

Writers for the publication are mostly freelance, most of them prominent community activists and leaders with writing backgrounds. As of September 2012 (the magazine's one-year anniversary), it claims a monthly circulation of 10,000, with over sixty distribution sites throughout Bartlesville and an active social media presence. The publication began providing digital versions of their publication online, and also works closely with 6Pack Apps in the marketing of an area application for Apple iPhone and iPad users called "The Bartleville App".
