= Bartlesville Public Schools =

School district in Oklahoma

Bartlesville Public Schools is a public school district located in Bartlesville, Oklahoma. The district had an enrollment of 5,963 in October 2008.

There are 13 schools.

It includes the vast majority of Bartesville, and has portions of Washington County, and Osage County.

== See also ==
- Bartlesville High School
