= Edward Buehler Delk =

American architect

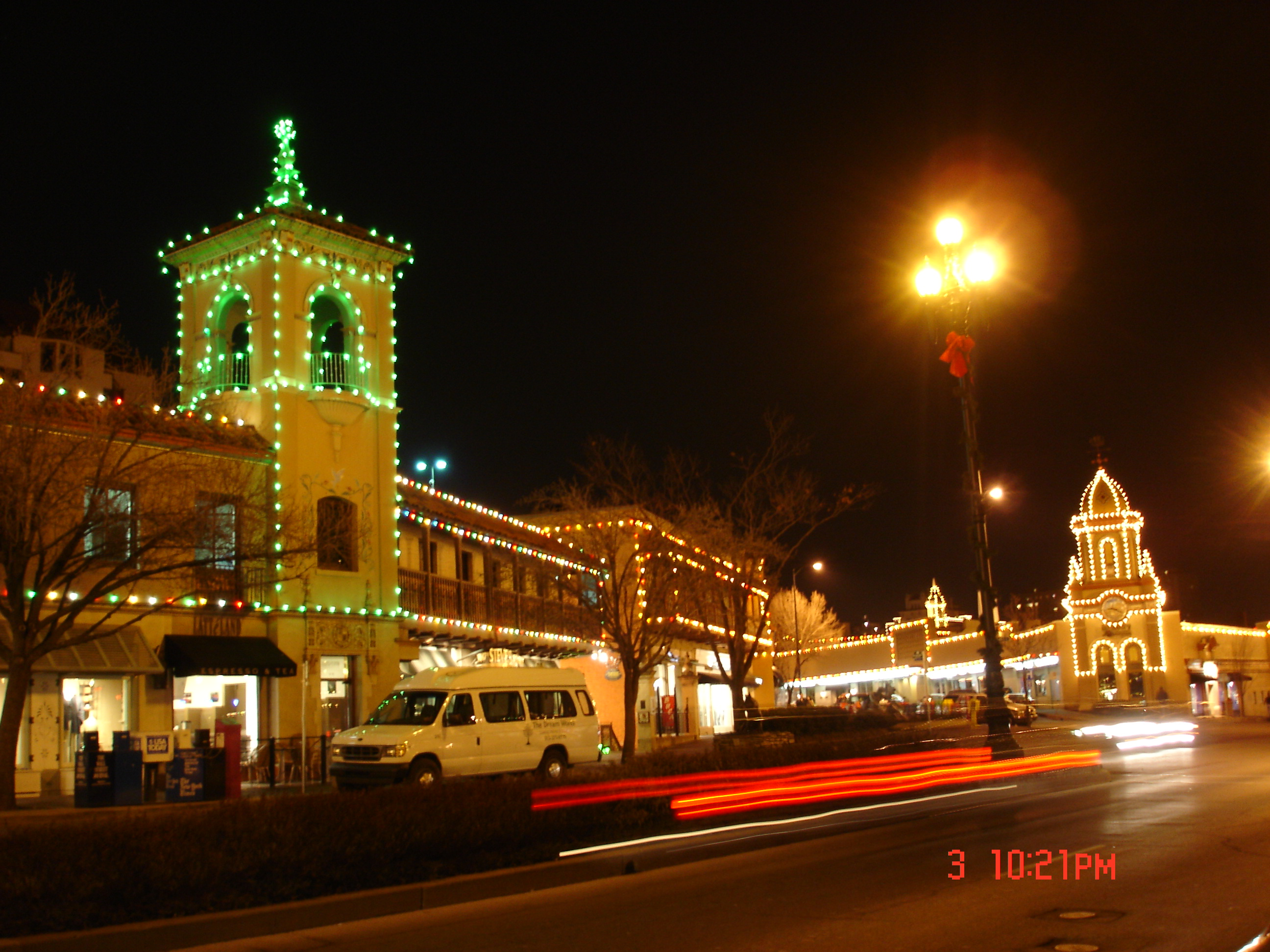
Country Club Plaza in Kansas City

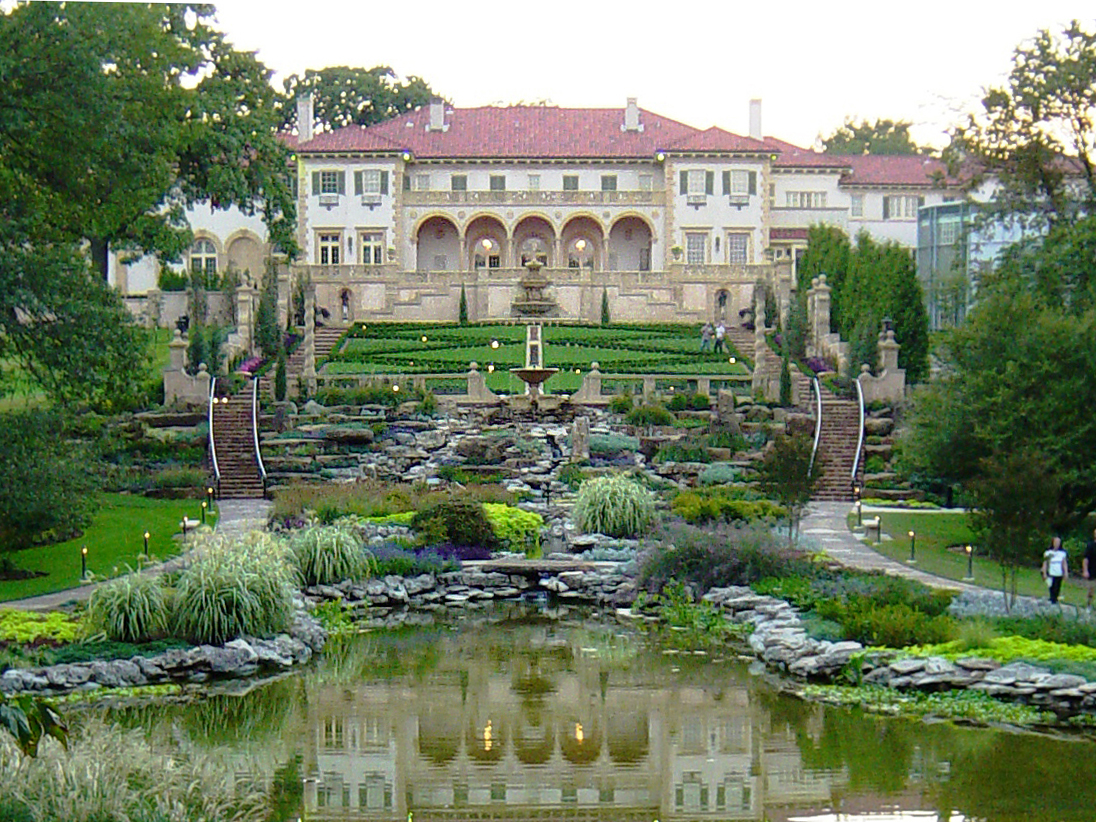
Philbrook

Edward Buehler Delk (1885–1956) was a prominent architect who designed many landmark buildings in the Midwest and Southwest regions of the United States.

Delk was born on September 22, 1885, in Schoharie, New York. He graduated from University of Pennsylvania in 1907. After serving in the Army Air Corps during World War I where he studied at the University of London after the war.

Among his most famous works were Spanish Colonial Revival buildings in the 1920s for Kansas City developer J.C. Nichols and Oklahoma oilman Waite Phillips.

On September 1, 1956, Edward B. Delk died unexpectedly at sea aboard the S. S. Excambion while returning with his wife Jane from a trip to Europe. He was buried in Philadelphia, Pennsylvania.

== Notable structures ==
- Country Club Plaza (1920) – Kansas City, Missouri
- Villa Philmonte (1926) – Cimarron, New Mexico
- Philbrook Museum of Art (1927) – Tulsa, Oklahoma
- Philtower (1927) - Tulsa, Oklahoma
- Community Christian Church (1940) (taken over from Frank Lloyd Wright) – Kansas City, Missouri
- Starlight Theatre (Kansas City) (1951) – Kansas City, Missouri
- LaQuinta Mansion (1932) - Bartlesville, Oklahoma
