= Pathfinder Parkway =

Trail that traverses Bartlesville, Oklahoma

Coordinates: 36°42′53.06″N 95°56′55.17″W

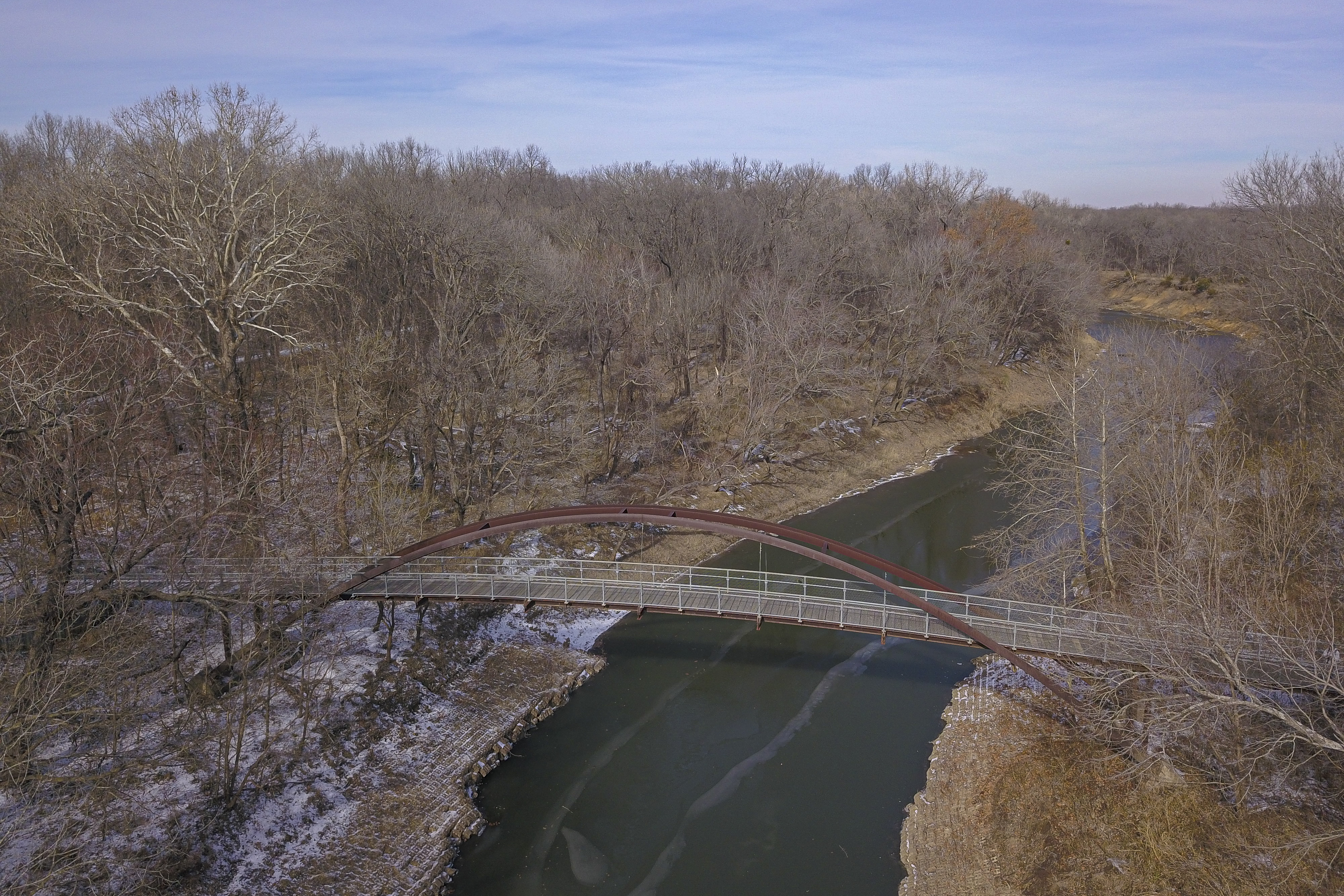
Pathfinder Parkway bridge, 2022

Pathfinder Parkway is a 12-mile (19 km) walking, jogging and biking trail that traverses Bartlesville, Oklahoma.

This 12-mile (19 km) paved pathway, for walking, jogging and biking, runs mostly along the Caney River and Turkey Creek, connecting Johnstone Park, Robinwood Park, Jo Allyn Lowe Park, Sooner Park, Bartlesville High School, the Wesleyan Church, and Eastland Shopping Center, at the corner of Hwy 75 and Frank Phillips Blvd.

Former city planner Joel Smith originally planned for Pathfinder to run along both sides of the Caney River and to connect to Circle Mountain.

The Pathfinder Parkway bridge, originally built in 1996, has been restored in the 2010s in part through local donations. Donors are recognized by having their names (or a dedication) engraved in one of the 235 wooden planks that make up the walkway of the bridge.

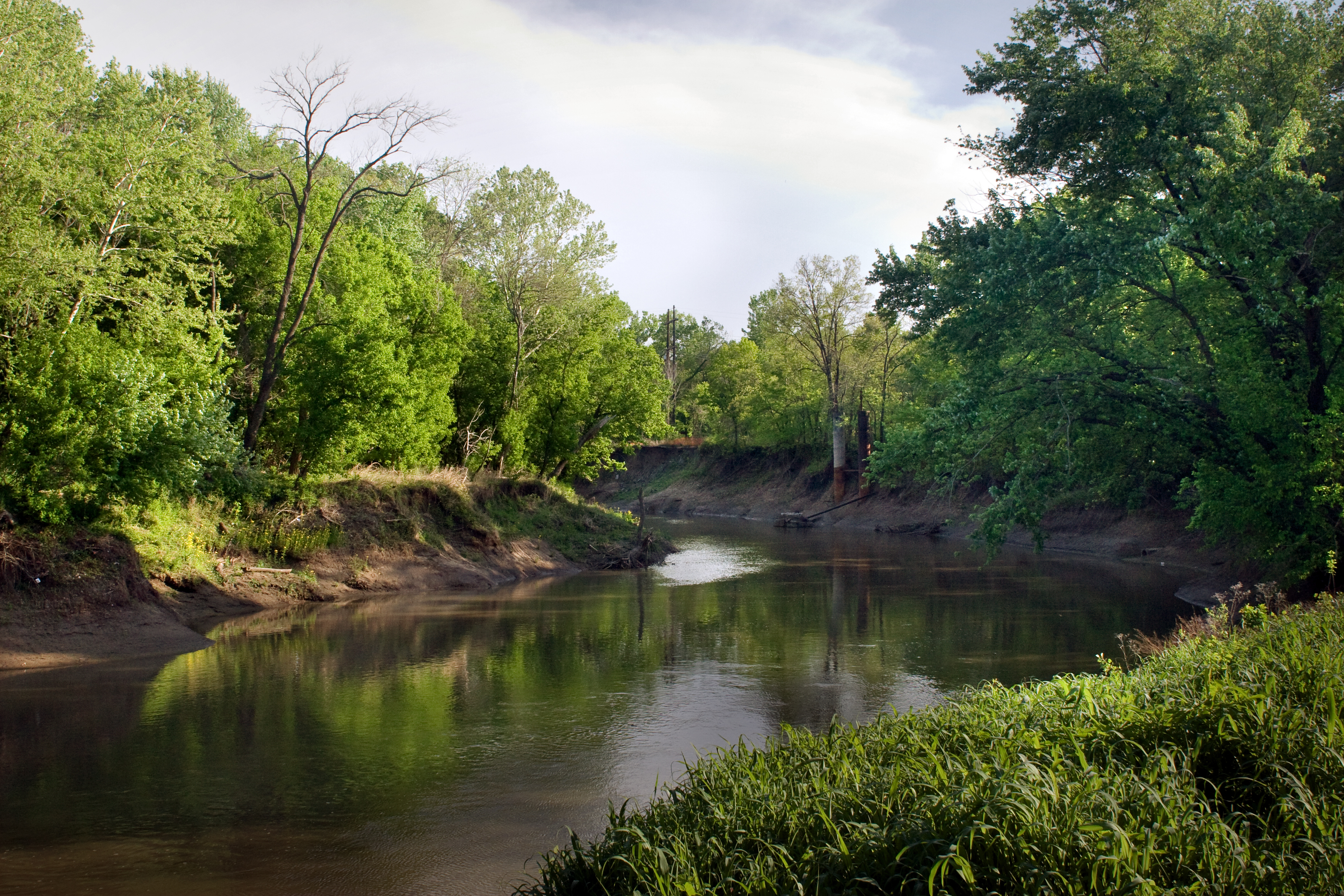
Caney River

== Timeline ==
- Designed by Joel Smith
- Original pathway constructed in 1976
- Designated as a National Recreation Trail in 1977
- Bridge rebuilt in 1996, restored 2012
- Extended in 1999
