= Jo Allyn Lowe Park =

Public park with an arboretum in Bartlesville, Oklahoma, United States

Coordinates: 36°42′55″N 95°56′47″W

- Interactive map of Jo Allyn Lowe Park
- Type: Public park, Arboretum
- Location: Bartlesville, Oklahoma
- Area: 32 acres (13 ha)
- Website: Official website

Jo Allyn Lowe Park is a 32 acres (13 ha) public park with an arboretum, located at the corner of Price Road and Locust Road, Bartlesville, Oklahoma, United States. The location is open to the public daily.

The park was created in 1980 and named to honor the founder of the Bartlesville Boys Club. It consists of a lake (with fishing pier), tallgrass prairie, and arboretum. The arboretum contains hundreds of species of trees, mostly planted as memorials.

This is an entrance point to Pathfinder Parkway, a bicycle/jogging/walking path that now extends south into Colonial Housing Addition, but the majority heads north toward Johnstone Park and connects to other parts of the Parkway.

== See also ==
- List of botanical gardens in the United States
