= Bartlesville High School =

Coordinates: 36.733782°N 95.974163°W

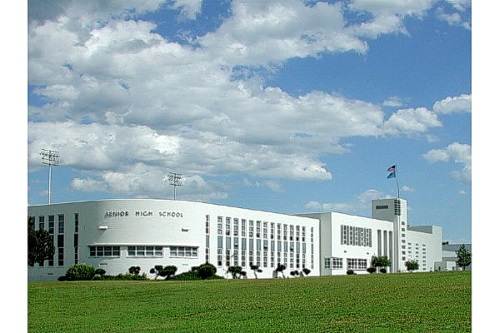
- 1700 SE Hillcrest Drive; Bartlesville, Oklahoma 74003; United States

Information
- Type: Public
- Established: 1940
- School district: Bartlesville Public Schools
- Principal: Michael Harp
- Faculty: 91.83
- Grades: 9 to 12
- Enrollment: 1,708 (2023–2024)
- Student to teacher ratio: 18.60
- Colors: Dark blue, light blue, white
- Mascot: Bruins
- Website: Bartlesville Bruins

Bartlesville High School is a public high school located in Bartlesville, Oklahoma. Built in 1939, it was originally called College High School, and until 1950 housed a junior college as well as the high school. Its Streamline Moderne building was designed by Tulsa architect John Duncan Forsyth. In 1982 Sooner High School and College High School unified to create Bartlesville High School at the former College High School site. The first graduating class of Bartlesville High School was in 1983.

== Curriculum ==
As of 2022 the school has Osage language as a class for world languages.

== Notable people ==
- Bud Adams, owner of the Tennessee Titans;
- Alan Armstrong, junior United States senator representing the state of Oklahoma since 2026
- Forrest Bennett, Oklahoma State Representative
- Markell Carter, NFL player
- Ree Drummond, blogger and TV cook
- Mark Houston, composer and actor
- A. J. Parker, NFL player

== See also ==
- Bartlesville Public Schools
