= Woolaroc =

Museum and wildlife preserve in Oklahoma, U.S.

- Woolaroc Museum & Wildlife Preserve
- U.S. National Register of Historic Places
- U.S. Historic district
- Location within Oklahoma Location within the United States
- Nearest city: Barnsdall, Oklahoma
- Coordinates: 36.642339°N 96.095964°W
- Area: 3,700 acres (1,500 ha)
- Built: 1925
- Architect: Ambler Associates; et al.
- Architectural style: Bungalow/Craftsman, Rustic
- NRHP reference No.: 08001151
- Added to NRHP: December 05, 2008

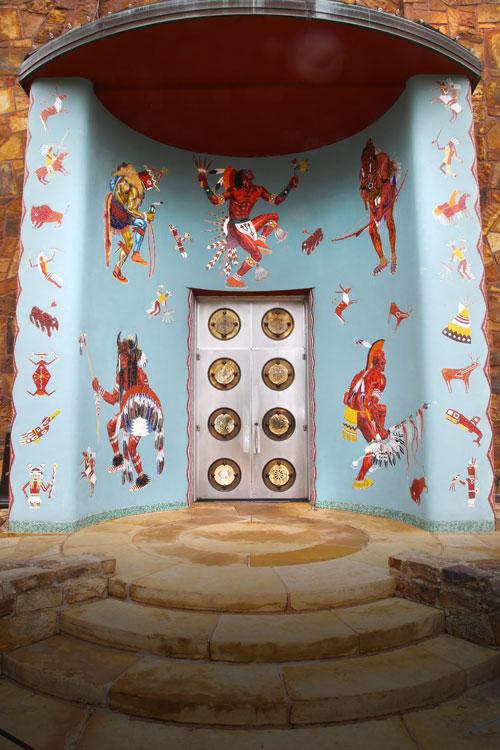
Woolaroc Museum front entrance

Woolaroc is a museum and wildlife preserve located in the Osage Hills of Northeastern Oklahoma on Oklahoma State Highway 123 about 12 mi (19 km) southwest of Bartlesville, Oklahoma, and 45 mi (72 km) north of Tulsa, Oklahoma. Woolaroc was established in 1925 as the ranch retreat of oilman Frank Phillips. The ranch is a 3,700-acre (1,500 ha) wildlife preserve, home to over 30 different species of native and exotic wildlife, such as bison, elk and longhorn cattle. Woolaroc is also a museum with a collection of Western art and artifacts, American Indian material, and one of the largest collections of Colt firearms in the world. Also on display is Woolaroc, the aircraft that won the ill-fated Dole Air Race in 1927. Woolaroc features a nature trail and a living history area inviting visitors to experience the natural environment of Woolaroc, the life in a pre-Civil War 1840s mountain man camp.

== Name ==
The name Woolaroc is a portmanteau of the words woods, lakes, and rocks that are featured in the Osage Hills of northeast Oklahoma where Woolaroc is located. The name was originally intended for the ranch house, but it soon became the name for the entire Frank Phillips ranch.

== History ==
Woolaroc is owned and operated by The Frank Phillips Foundation, Inc. founded in 1937 by oilman Frank Phillips and his wife Jane Phillips. In 1944, the Phillips donated all of their personal holdings of Woolaroc grounds, facilities, animals, collections, and art to the foundation. At that time it was determined that the primary purpose of the foundation was to assure the operation and the preservation of Woolaroc. The foundation, a 501(c)(3), is headed by a board of trustees. The mission of Frank Phillips when he built Woolaroc in 1925 was to preserve the history of the West, educate, and entertain.

In 2025, Phillips 66 announced that it would be closing its company museum in Bartlesville and giving its collection, along with $5 million, to Woolaroc.

== Museum collection ==
=== Woolaroc aircraft ===
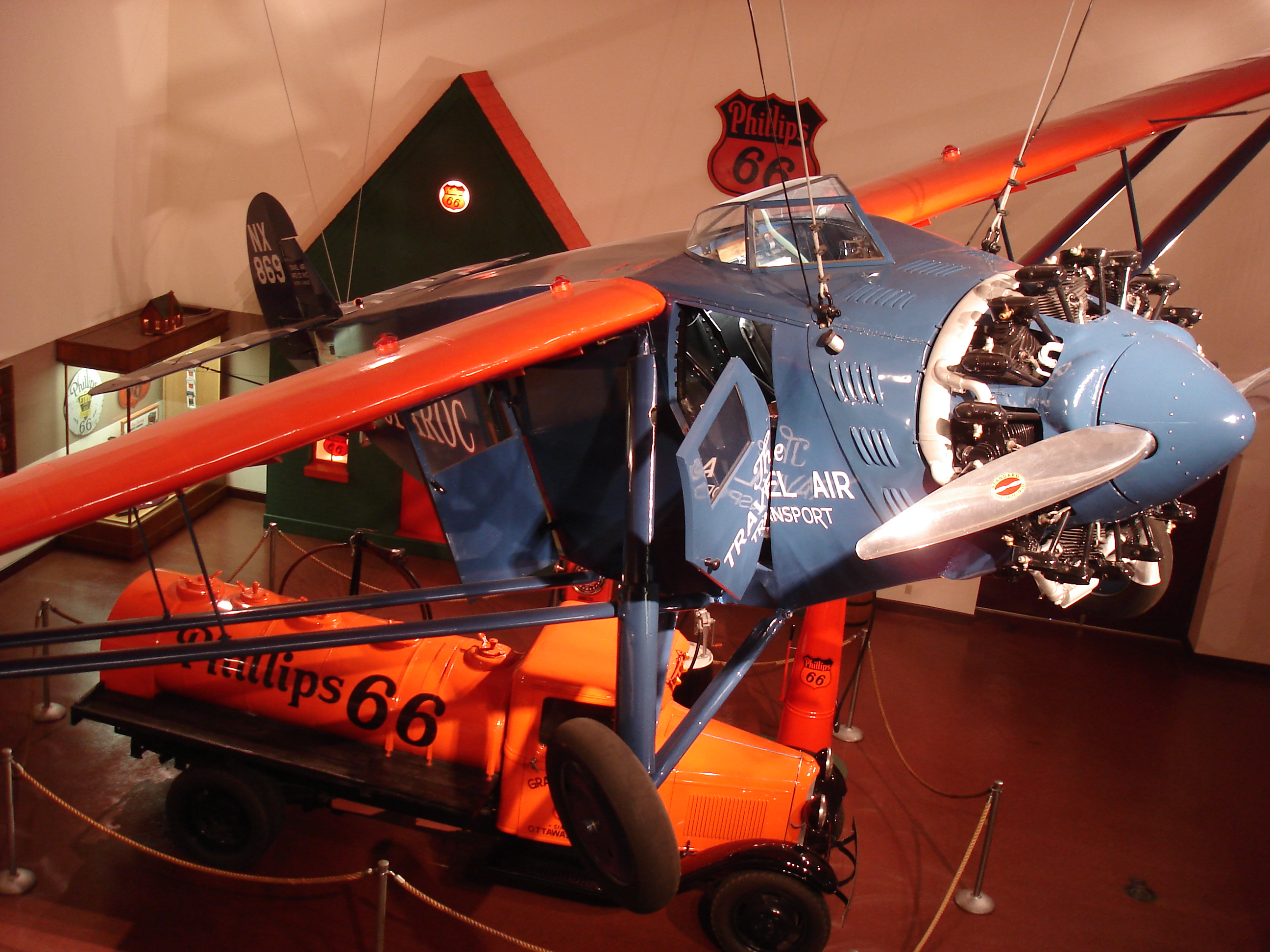
"Woolaroc" airplane, winner of the 1927 Dole Air Race, at the Woolaroc museum in Oklahoma. August 2, 2008. Photo courtesy of Tyler Thompson

The museum started out as a hangar in 1929 for the Woolaroc, a single-engine, single-wing Travel Air 5000 airplane initially designed by Clyde Cessna, that Frank Phillips sponsored in the Dole Air Race from Oakland, California, to Honolulu, Hawaii, in 1927. (Note: The race was later called "tragic" and "ill-fated" in the news media. Of the 15 to 18 planes that were officially entered, only 15 were actually able to take off. At least three crashed while en route to Oakland. Woolaroc won the race. One other plane landed safely at the assigned destination. Most of the others either crashed, some over land but many over the ocean. Pilots and crew members of the latter were simply lost and never found.) Woolaroc is the only plane from the race that still survives. It stands in its hangar at the Phillips Museum. Its sister plane, Oklahoma, also sponsored by Phillips, aborted the race at San Francisco because of mechanical problems.

Over the years Phillips continued to receive gifts, and made art acquisitions, and the museum grew room by room. The museum is 50,000 square feet (4,600 m^{2}) and now has over 600 paintings, 300 bronzes, over 2,300 pieces of Native American art and artifacts, as well as many pieces of taxidermy that decorate the walls of the museum and lodge. The galleries feature some of the premier Indian and Western artists in America's history: Remington, Russell, Leigh, Moran, Couse, Johnson, Sharp, Balink, Hennings, Ufer, Berninghaus, Bierstadt, and others. The second Woolaroc plane was a B-17 "Flying Fortress", piloted by Ellison Miles, who later became an oil tycoon, but kept in touch with Frank Phillips during the war, writing back and forth. Mr. Phillips wanted to have the plane brought to his museum, but it was blown apart and salvaged for scraps right after Mr. Miles and co-pilot John Qua had finished their mandatory 25 grueling missions. They lost only one crew member on those missions, on average, 3 out of 5 men make it through the 25 missions. "Liberty Letters" is the name of the book written for Mr. Miles for his anniversary, and has the crew photo on the front with John Qua next to him. The title of the book is "Liberty Letters" because Mr. Ellison was from Liberty, Texas.

== Woolaroc Ranch Historic District ==
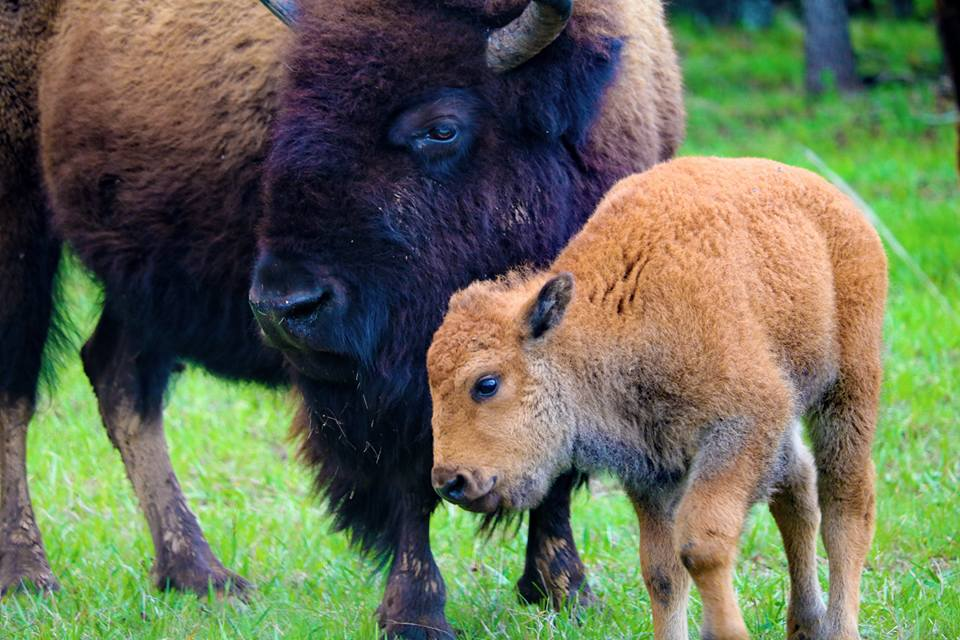
Bison on the Woolaroc Wildlife Preserve

Woolaroc Ranch Historic District, also known as Rock Creek Game Preserve, Frank Phillips Ranch, Phillips Osage Park and Woolaroc Museum and Wildlife Preserve, was listed on the National Register of Historic Places on December 5, 2008. It is significant as a reflection of the time period and for its role in the petroleum industry of the time. It is also significant for its landscape architecture. Contributing resources include 18 buildings, 22 sites, 115 structures, and 17 objects. It was listed as a featured property of the week in a program of the National Park Service that began in July 2008.

== The Pioneer Woman models ==
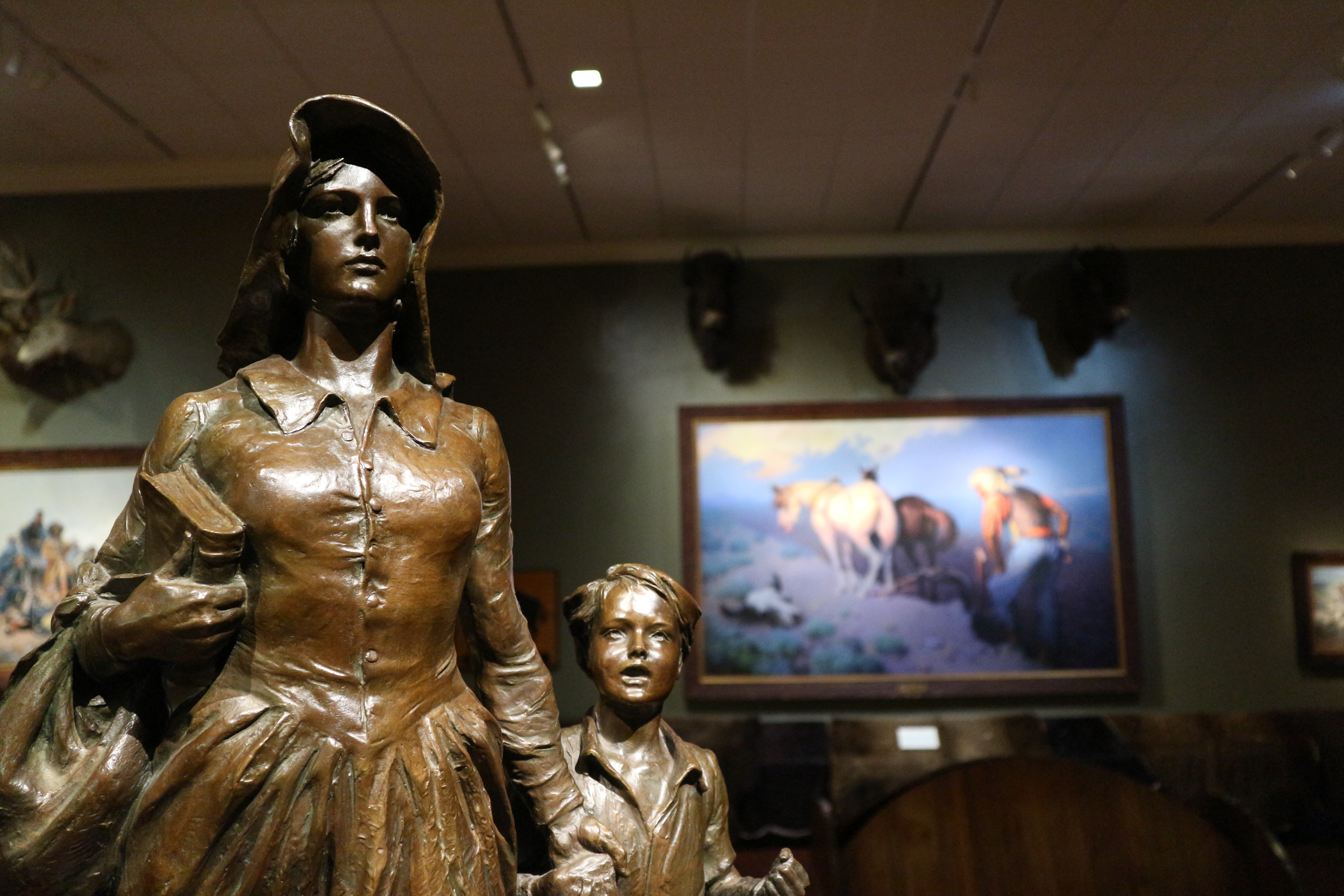
Woolaroc Museum

In 1928, E. W. Marland, founder of Marland Oil Company (later to become Conoco) and at that time one of the wealthiest men in the world, commissioned twelve miniature 3-foot (0.91 m) sculptures that were submitted by US and international sculptors as models for the Pioneer Woman statue. The commission that Marland paid each sculptor has been variously cited as $10,000 and as $2,000 for each submission. The miniatures traveled to twelve cities where they were viewed by 750,000 people who cast votes for their favorite.

The twelve submissions included Protective by John Gregory; Determined by Maurice Sterne; Challenging by Hermon Atkins MacNeil; Affectionate by James E. Fraser; Self-Reliant by Alexander Stirling Calder; "Fearless" by Wheeler Williams; "Heroic" by Mario Korbel; Adventurous by F. Lynn Jenkins; Sturdy by Mahonri Young; Faithful by Arthur Lee; Trusting by Jo Davidson; and Confident by Bryant Baker. The New York Times reported on March 27, 1927, that the exhibition had arrived in New York City and that it had attracted "more interest than any exhibition of sculpture New York has known in a long while." The twelve models were exhibited for three weeks in the Reinhardt Galleries and Bryant Baker's model was the winner of the first place in the New York balloting. The Times Reported that "Baker not only won first honors, but was the last man to enter the contest having no more than a month to prepare his model and obtain a casting." Marland pronounced himself pleased with the models. "I believe all of the sculptors have done well," said Marland. "We could select any one of the twelve figures and get an excellent interpretation of the frontier woman. The decision will be a hard one to make. I expect to be guided largely by public taste, but the final decision will be my own. This national vote is going to show exactly what the American people think about one of the greatest of their women," Marland added.

The exhibition touched a popular chord in American culture of the time. The New York Times reported on March 27, 1927, that among those who visited the exhibition at the Reinhardt Galleries was 91-year-old Betty Wollman, who as a young bride had journeyed from St. Louis to Leavenworth, Kansas in 1855, and had once entertained Abraham Lincoln as a dinner guest in the Wollman household in Leavenworth long before Lincoln was a candidate for president. Wollman spoke about women's role during pioneer days in the old west and congratulated Marland for his proposal to erect a statue to the Pioneer Woman. "Mr. Marland is to be congratulated for doing this in commemoration of these early women of the West," said Wollman. "The hardships were many, and the courage and self-denial of the women who worked side by side with their husbands and sons and brothers in those primitive days are largely responsible for the development of the Middle Western States, now so rich in everything that goes to make life worth living."

The winning statue nationwide was Confident, produced by British-born American sculptor Bryant Baker. It is believed that Marland's personal favorite was Trusting by Jo Davidson who had also sculpted statues of Marland, his wife Lydie, and his brother George. Time magazine ran a story about the competition and compared the competing designs:

The pioneer woman selected was not the ugly one executed by Mahonri Young; it was not the demure one executed by Jo Davidson; it was not the brawny one of James Earle Fraser, nor the placid one of Arthur Lee, nor the fragile one of F. Lynn Jenkins. Nor was it Maurice Sterne's, Hermon A. MacNeil's, Alexander Stirling Calder's, although these artists too were among those who made models for the competition. It was not John Gregory's sturdy female, snatching a musket from her moribund husband, although this one ran second in the balloting and won first place in three cities. Instead, it was Bryant Baker's striding figure of a woman whose skirts are blown backward in a prairie breeze, who carries a Bible in one hand, leads her scampish belligerent little boy with the other. This had received most votes in eleven cities; by far the largest total out of the 123,000 votes cast.

Baker's sculpture was unveiled in Ponca City in a public ceremony on April 22, 1930, when forty thousand guests came to hear Will Rogers pay tribute to Oklahoma's pioneers. President Hoover addressed the nation over a nationwide radio network for the commemoration of the statue. "It was those women who carried the refinement, the moral character and spiritual force into the West," said Hoover. "Not only they bore great burdens of daily toil and the rearing of families, but there were intent that their children should have a chance, that the doors of opportunity," added Hoover. The finished statue of the Pioneer Woman Statue was 27 feet (8.2 m) high and weighed 12,000 pounds (5,400 kg).

After financial reverses that included the loss of his company Marland Oil Company, E. W. Marland wrote a letter to his friend Frank Phillips on March 11, 1940. "My financial condition compells [sic] me to sell objects of art, tapestries, bronzes, rugs, and paintings acquired by me in more prosperous years," wrote Marland. "I will sell at a price approximately 25 per cent of their cost to me... And will consider it a kindness if you will come yourself or send someone to look them over with the object of buying anything you fancy."

Phillips sent art expert Gordon Matzene to inspect the bronzes and began bargaining with Marland for their purchase. In the end Phillips offered Marland $500 for each of the twelve miniatures. Matzene declared that the purchase was a wonderful bargain and the miniatures were removed from Ponca City along with other statues and artwork to become part of Phillips' collection at Woolaroc where they are on display.

== Visiting Woolaroc ==
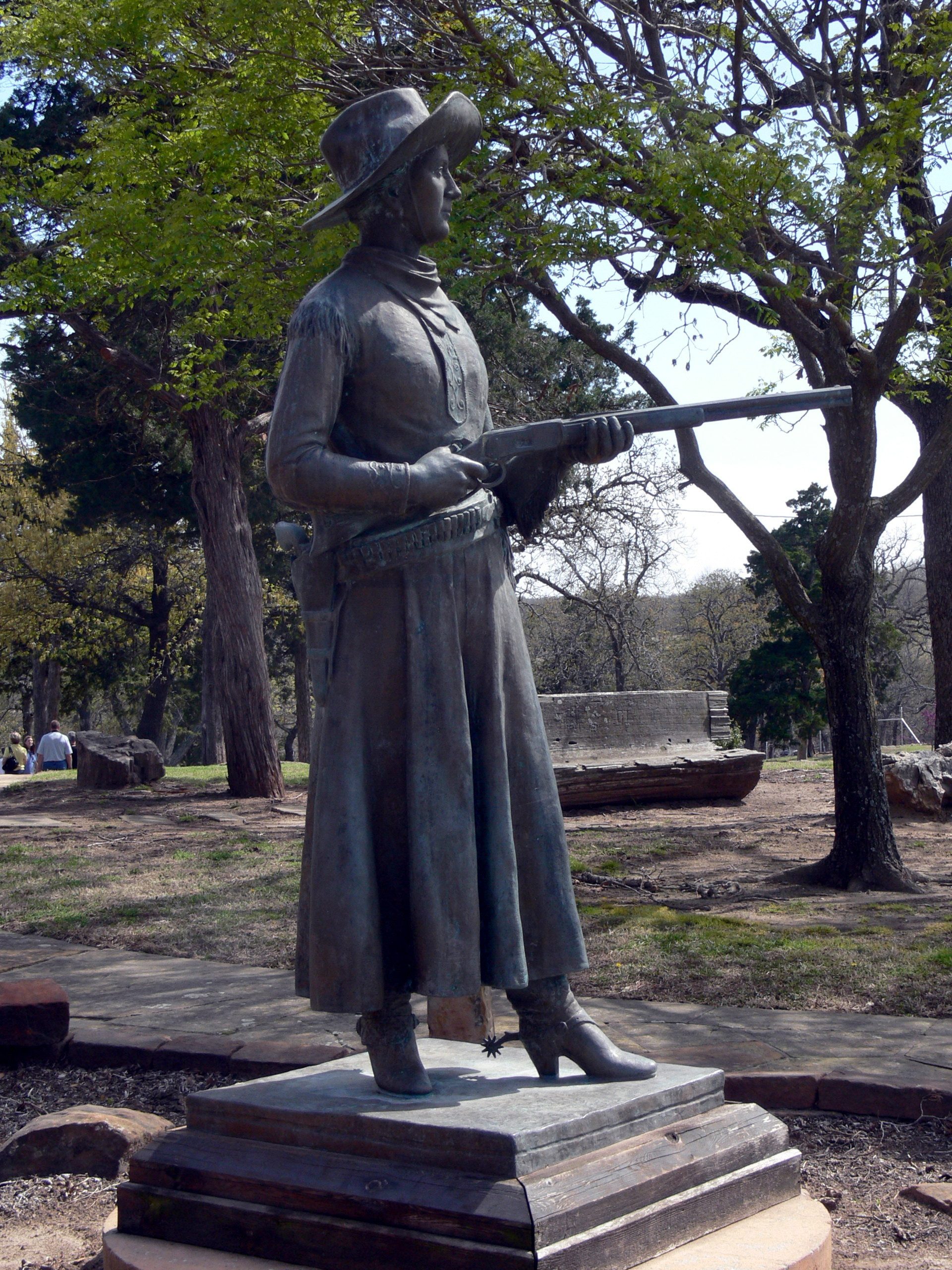
Statue of Belle Starr at Woolaroc

Woolaroc is open year-round from 10 a.m. to 5 p.m. CST Wednesday through Sunday and is closed on Monday and Tuesday. During the summer (Memorial Day through Labor Day), it is also open on Tuesdays. Bicycles are prohibited from entering the preserve.

== See also ==
- Dole Air Race
- National Register of Historic Places listings in Osage County, Oklahoma
- Frank and Jane Phillips House, the Phillips family's house in Bartlesville
