= Scotia, Nebraska =

- Village
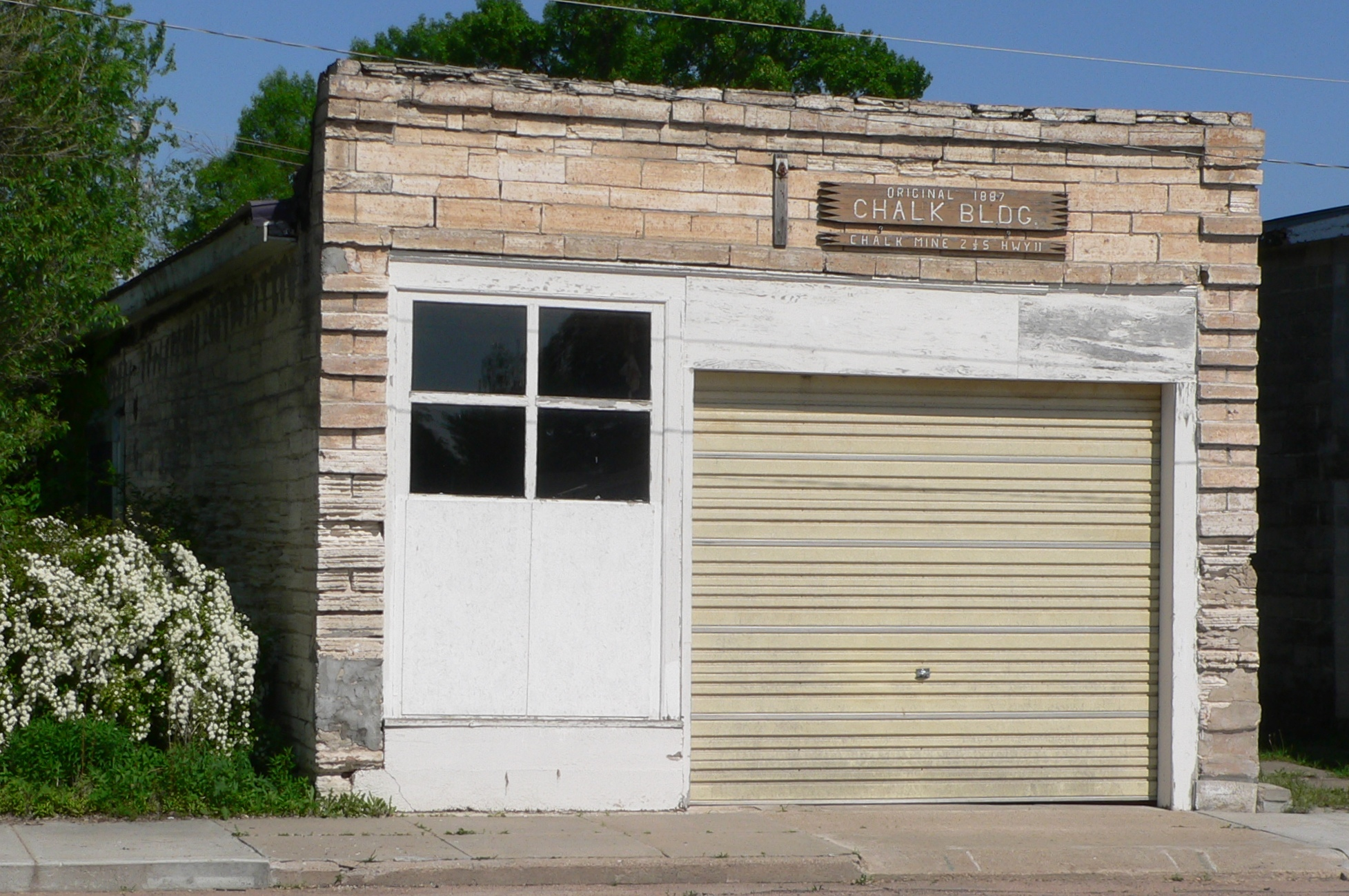
- The Chalk Building in downtown Scotia was constructed from locally quarried chalk rock. It is listed in the National Register of Historic Places.

- Location of Scotia, Nebraska
- Coordinates: 41°28′04″N 98°42′09″W
- Country: United States
- State: Nebraska
- County: Greeley

Area
  - Total: 0.35 sq mi (0.90 km^{2})
  - Land: 0.35 sq mi (0.90 km^{2})
  - Water: 0 sq mi (0.00 km^{2})
- Elevation: 1,933 ft (589 m)

Population (2020)
  - Total: 301
  - Density: 868.0/sq mi (335.15/km^{2})
- Time zone: UTC-6 (Central (CST))
  - Summer (DST): UTC-5 (CDT)
- ZIP code: 68875
- Area code: 308
- FIPS code: 31-44070
- GNIS feature ID: 2399775

Scotia is a village in Greeley County, Nebraska, United States. As of the 2020 census, Scotia had a population of 301.

== History ==
Scotia was founded in the 1870s. A Scottish settler suggested the name Scotia, a literary name for Scotland.

Scotia was designated the first county seat.

== Geography ==
According to the United States Census Bureau, the village has a total area of 0.35 square miles (0.91 km^{2}), all of it land.

Scotia is located on Nebraska Highway 22 (Scotia Avenue).

== Demographics ==
Historical population
Census	Pop.	Note	%±
1890	418		—
1900	267		−36.1%
1910	328		22.8%
1920	559		70.4%
1930	474		−15.2%
1940	453		−4.4%
1950	474		4.6%
1960	350		−26.2%
1970	354		1.1%
1980	349		−1.4%
1990	318		−8.9%
2000	308		−3.1%
2010	318		3.2%
2020	301		−5.3%
U.S. Decennial Census

=== 2010 census ===
As of the census of 2010, there were 318 people, 139 households, and 92 families residing in the village. The population density was 908.6 inhabitants per square mile (350.8/km^{2}). There were 166 housing units at an average density of 474.3 per square mile (183.1/km^{2}). The racial makeup of the village was 98.1% White, 0.3% African American, 0.9% Native American, 0.3% from other races, and 0.3% from two or more races. Hispanic or Latino of any race were 0.6% of the population.

There were 139 households, of which 25.2% had children under the age of 18 living with them, 56.8% were married couples living together, 5.0% had a female householder with no husband present, 4.3% had a male householder with no wife present, and 33.8% were non-families. 29.5% of all households were made up of individuals, and 15.1% had someone living alone who was 65 years of age or older. The average household size was 2.29 and the average family size was 2.79.

The median age in the village was 42.8 years. 22% of residents were under the age of 18; 6.9% were between the ages of 18 and 24; 22.2% were from 25 to 44; 25.5% were from 45 to 64; and 23.3% were 65 years of age or older. The gender makeup of the village was 45.9% male and 54.1% female.

=== 2000 census ===
As of the census of 2000, there were 308 people, 140 households, and 88 families residing in the village. The population density was 889.0 inhabitants per square mile (343.2/km^{2}). There were 167 housing units at an average density of 482.0 per square mile (186.1/km^{2}). The racial makeup of the village was 94.16% White, 3.90% African American, 0.32% from other races, and 1.62% from two or more races. Hispanic or Latino of any race were 0.65% of the population.

There were 140 households, out of which 20.7% had children under the age of 18 living with them, 57.9% were married couples living together, 4.3% had a female householder with no husband present, and 37.1% were non-families. 36.4% of all households were made up of individuals, and 25.7% had someone living alone who was 65 years of age or older. The average household size was 2.20 and the average family size was 2.88.

In the village, the population was spread out, with 22.1% under the age of 18, 5.2% from 18 to 24, 20.1% from 25 to 44, 21.1% from 45 to 64, and 31.5% who were 65 years of age or older. The median age was 49 years. For every 100 females, there were 87.8 males. For every 100 females age 18 and over, there were 79.1 males.

As of 2000 the median income for a household in the village was $23,750, and the median income for a family was $28,750. Males had a median income of $21,563 versus $15,625 for females. The per capita income for the village was $11,871. About 5.8% of families and 7.3% of the population were below the poverty line, including 6.9% of those under the age of eighteen and 4.0% of those 65 or over.

== Notable people ==
- Frank Phillips, co-founder of Phillips Petroleum Company
