= National Register of Historic Places listings in Washington County, Oklahoma =

Location of Washington County in Oklahoma

This is a list of the National Register of Historic Places listings in Washington County, Oklahoma.

This is intended to be a complete list of the properties and districts on the National Register of Historic Places in Washington County, Oklahoma, United States. The locations of National Register properties and districts for which the latitude and longitude coordinates are included below, may be seen in a map.

There are 11 properties and districts listed on the National Register in the county, including 1 National Historic Landmark. Another property was once listed but has since been removed.

This National Park Service list is complete through NPS recent listings posted September 4, 2026.

== Current listings ==
	Name on the Register	Image	Date listed	Location	City or town	Description
1	Bartlesville Downtown Historic District	Bartlesville Downtown Historic District	December 27, 1991 (#91001905)	Roughly bounded by SE. 2nd St., SE. Cherokee Ave., SE. 4th St., and the former ATSF railroad tracks 36°45′02″N 95°58′35″W	Bartlesville	
2	C.A. Comer House	C.A. Comer House	June 8, 2015 (#15000330)	1316 North Creek; 36°48′21″N 95°56′00″W	Dewey	
3	Dewey Hotel	Dewey Hotel	April 4, 1975 (#75001578)	Delaware and Don Tyler Ave. 36°47′57″N 95°56′15″W	Dewey	
4	First United Methodist Church		December 1, 2020 (#100005865)	500 South Johnstone Ave. 36°44′54″N 95°58′41″W	Bartlesville	
5	House at 1554 SW Rogers	House at 1554 SW Rogers	February 9, 2009 (#09000080)	1554 SW. Rogers; 36°44′05″N 95°59′28″W	Bartlesville	
6	LaQuinta	LaQuinta	July 15, 1982 (#82003716)	2201 Silver Lake Rd. 36°43′03″N 95°57′30″W	Bartlesville	
7	Nellie Johnstone No. 1	Nellie Johnstone No. 1	April 11, 1972 (#72001077)	Johnstone Park; 36°45′23″N 95°58′19″W	Bartlesville	
8	Old Washington County Courthouse	Old Washington County Courthouse	January 26, 1981 (#81000469)	501 SE Frank Phillips Boulevard; 36°45′01″N 95°58′17″W	Bartlesville	
9	Frank and Jane Phillips House	Frank and Jane Phillips House	March 13, 1975 (#75001576)	1107 SE. Cherokee Ave. 36°44′31″N 95°58′30″W	Bartlesville	
10	Price Tower	Price Tower	September 13, 1974 (#74001670)	510 Dewey Ave. 36°44′51″N 95°58′34″W	Bartlesville	Only realized skyscraper designed by Frank Lloyd Wright
11	Washington County Memorial Hospital	Washington County Memorial Hospital	March 11, 2014 (#14000055)	412 SE. Frank Phillips Blvd. 36°45′04″N 95°58′21″W	Bartlesville	

== Former listing ==
	Name on the Register	Image	Date listed	Date removed	Location	City or town	Description
1	Civic Center		December 29, 1989 (#89002122)	June 3, 2009	Johnstone Ave. between 6th St. and Adams Boulevard; 36°44′49″N 95°58′39″W	Bartlesville	Demolished

== See also ==
- List of National Historic Landmarks in Oklahoma
- National Register of Historic Places listings in Oklahoma
