= Bartlesville Municipal Airport =

Airport in Oklahoma, United States

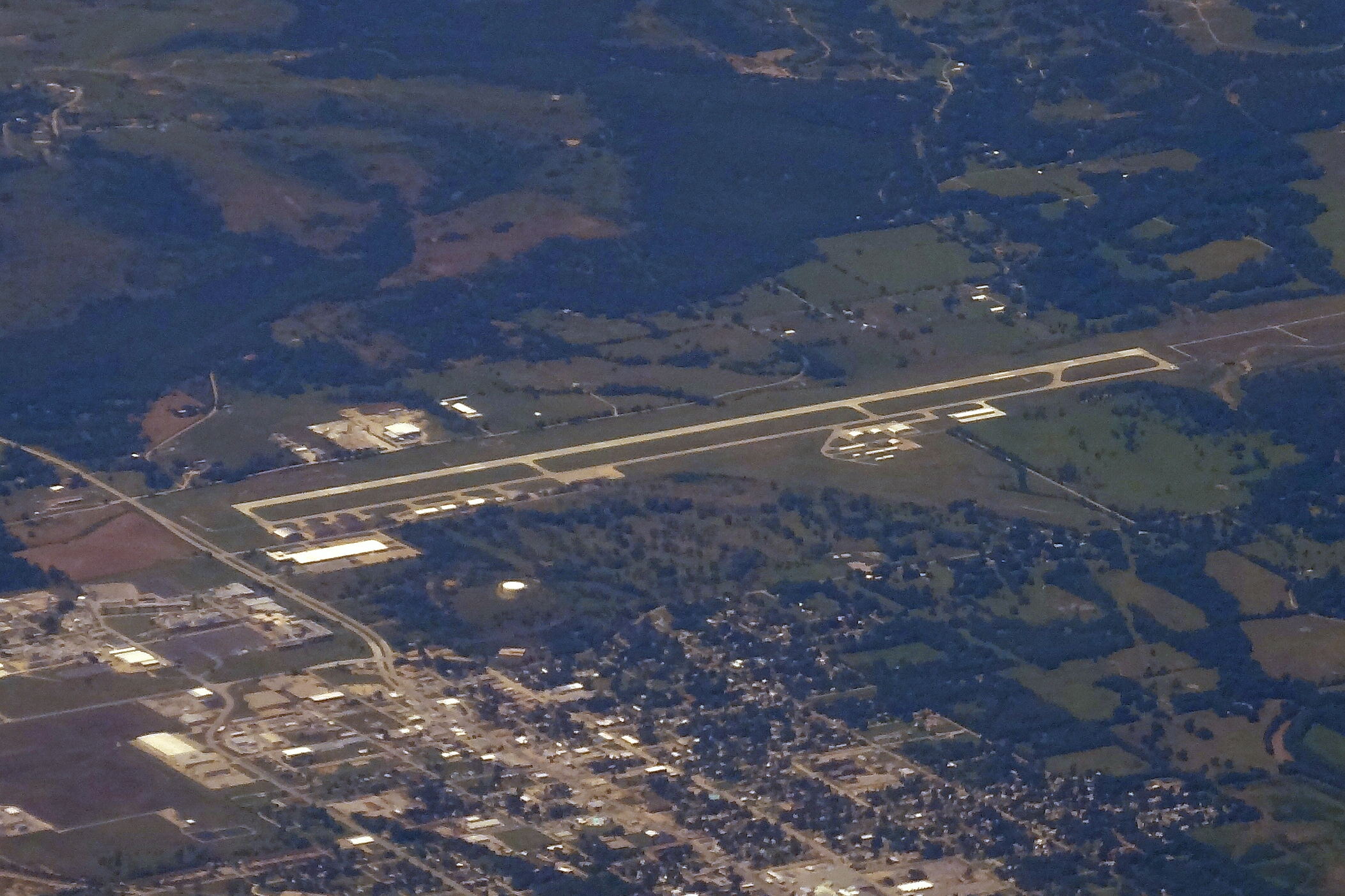
- IATA: BVO; ICAO: KBVO; FAA LID: BVO

Summary
- Airport type: Public
- Owner: City of Bartlesville
- Serves: Bartlesville, Oklahoma
- Elevation AMSL: 717 ft (219 m)
- Coordinates: 36°45′51″N 096°00′40″W

Map
- Location within Oklahoma Location within the United States

Runways
Direction	Length		Surface
Direction	ft	m	Surface
17/35	6,850	2,088	Concrete

Statistics (2023)
- Aircraft operations (year ending 3/17/2023): 12,362
- Based aircraft: 48
- Source: Federal Aviation Administration

Bartlesville Municipal Airport (IATA: BVO, ICAO: KBVO, FAA LID: BVO) is in Osage County, Oklahoma, United States. It is owned by the City of Bartlesville and is one mile northwest of downtown. The National Plan of Integrated Airport Systems for 2011–2015 called it a general aviation facility.

== Historical airline service ==
Bartlesville received commercial airline service, between 1949 and 1974. Continental Airlines operated Douglas DC-3s at the airport from 1949 until 1961. Central Airlines arrived in 1950 flying Beechcraft Bonanzas and later upgrading to Douglas DC-3s and Convair 240s. In 1967, Central merged into the original Frontier Airlines (1950-1986) which flew Convair 580 aircraft. All carriers flew routes to Kansas City and Tulsa, while Continental also flew direct to Denver with several stops. Frontier ended service in early 1974, and Bartlesville has not seen scheduled air service since then. Bartlesville is only 40 miles north of Tulsa.

== Facilities ==
The airport covers 430 acres (174 ha) at an elevation of 717 feet (219 m). Its single runway, 17/35, is 6,850 by 100 feet (2,088 x 30 m) concrete.

In the year ending March 17, 2023, the airport had 12,362 aircraft operations, average 34 per day, all general aviation. 48 aircraft were then based at this airport: 38 single-engine, 5 multi-engine, and 5 jet.

== Accidents near BVO ==
- On December 12, 1956, a Lockheed Model 18 Lodestar operated by Phillips Petroleum Company crashed 11 km (6.9 mls) SE of BVO after takeoff because of single-engine failure and not being able to unfeather the failed propeller. All 8 occupants were killed.

== See also ==
- List of airports in Oklahoma
