= Bartlesville, Oklahoma =

Bartlesville, Oklahoma Kamink (Delaware)
- City
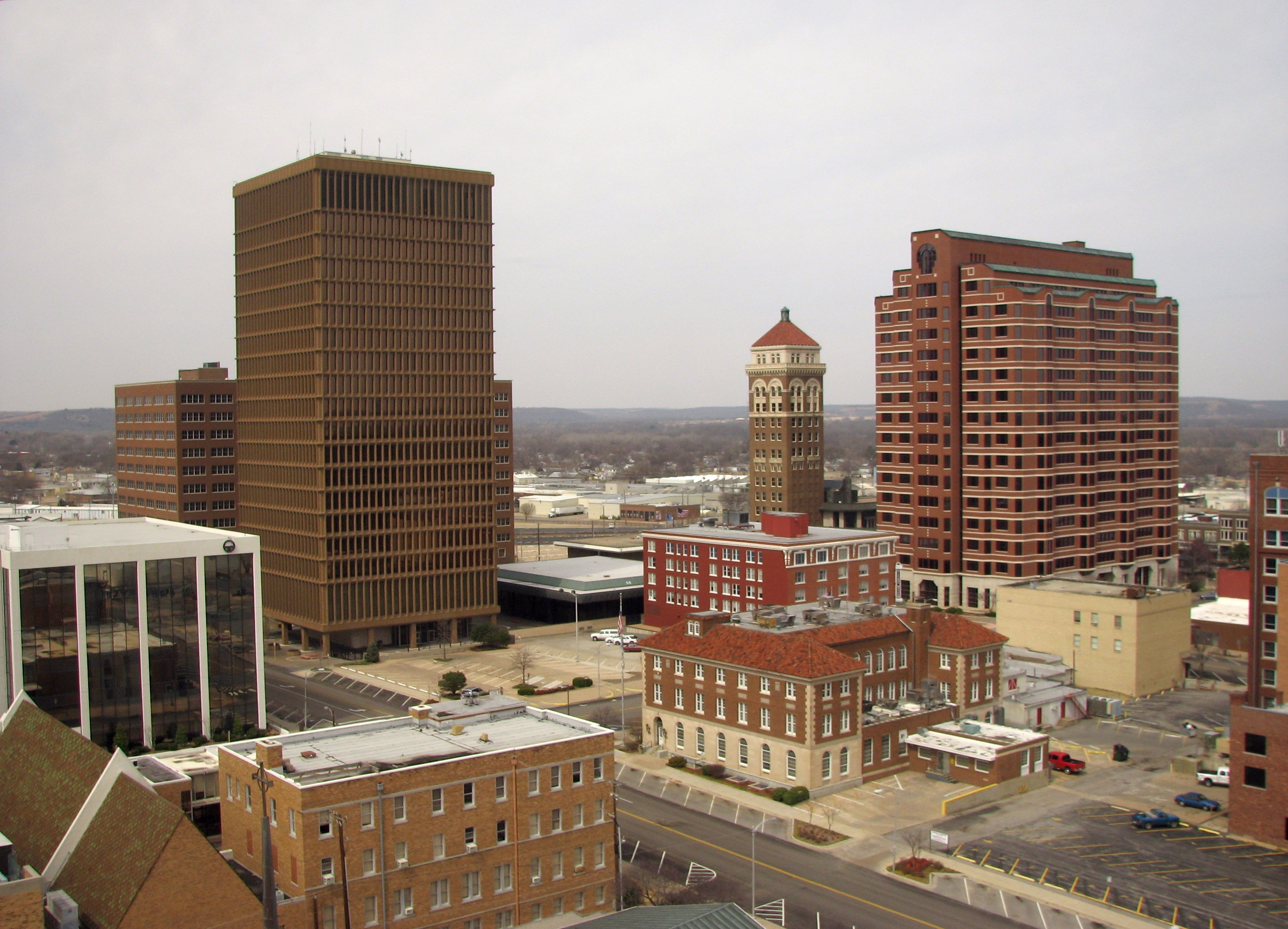
- Downtown Bartlesville viewed from the Price Tower (2008)

- Logo
- Nickname: B-ville
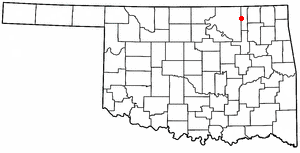
- Location of Bartlesville within Oklahoma
- Coordinates: 36°44′50″N 95°57′34″W
- Country: United States
- State: Oklahoma
- Counties: Washington, Osage
- Bartlesville, Indian Territory: January 15, 1897

Area
  - Total: 22.58 sq mi (58.47 km^{2})
  - Land: 22.55 sq mi (58.41 km^{2})
  - Water: 0.023 sq mi (0.06 km^{2})
- Elevation: 702 ft (214 m)

Population (2020)
  - Total: 37,290
  - Density: 1,653.6/sq mi (638.45/km^{2})
  - μSA: 52,455 (US: 198th)
  - CSA: 1,153,719 (US: 53rd)
- Demonym: Bartian
- Time zone: UTC−6 (Central (CST))
  - Summer (DST): UTC−5 (CDT)
- ZIP Codes: 74003-74006
- Area codes: 539/918
- FIPS code: 40-04450
- GNIS feature ID: 2409792
- Website: cityofbartlesville.org

Bartlesville is a city in Washington County, Oklahoma, United States. The population was 37,290 at the 2020 census. Bartlesville is 47 miles (76 km) north of Tulsa and 18 miles (29 km) south of the Kansas border. It is the county seat of Washington County. The Caney River runs through Bartlesville.

Bartlesville is the primary city of the Bartlesville Micropolitan area, which consists of Washington County and had a population of 51,843 in 2018. A small portion of the city is in Osage County. The city is also part of the Tulsa Combined Statistical Area, with a population of 1,151,172 in 2015.

Bartlesville is notable as the longtime home of Phillips Petroleum Company. Frank Phillips founded Phillips Petroleum in Bartlesville in 1905 when the area was still an Indian Territory. The company merged with Conoco as ConocoPhillips and later split into the two independent companies, Phillips 66 and ConocoPhillips. Both companies have retained some operations in Bartlesville, but they have moved their corporate headquarters to Houston.

It is one of two places in Oklahoma where a Lenape Native American tribe lives, the other being Anadarko.

== History ==
Jacob Bartles, son-in-law of Delaware chief Charles Journeycake, moved from Wyandotte County, Kansas, to Indian Territory in 1873. He settled first at Silver Lake, a natural lake south of the present city of Bartlesville. In 1874, he opened a trading post and post office on Turkey Creek, in what is now East Bartlesville. In the following year, he bought a grist mill on the Caney River and modified it to produce flour. Bartles then built a two-story general store and residence, and added a rooming house, a blacksmith shop and a livery stable. Other settlers soon moved into the immediate area, which was then called Bartles Town. In 1880, Bartles moved his Turkey Creek post office to this town. Bartles then provided the community with electricity, a telephone system and a water distribution system.

Development of the present city began after William Johnstone and George B. Keeler opened a general store on the south side of the Caney River in 1884. The first newspaper, The Weekly Magnet, began publication in March 1895. The town was incorporated in Indian Territory in January 1897. The town was surveyed and platted in 1898, and eighty acres were offered to the Atchison, Topeka and Santa Fe Railroad for a depot. The railroad, through its Kansas, Oklahoma Central and Southwestern Railway subsidiary, reached the town in 1899. The post office was moved from "North Bartlesville" in 1899. Bypassed by the railroad, Jacob Bartles moved his store to what became Dewey, Oklahoma.

Bartlesville was also home to Frank Phillips (November 28, 1873 – August 23, 1950) who along with his brother, Lee Eldas "L.E." Phillips Sr founded Phillips Petroleum in Bartlesville in 1917 and made Bartlesville the headquarters of Phillips 66. The new company began with assets of $3 million, 27 employees and leases throughout Oklahoma and Kansas but grew to become a multi-billion dollar oil company. Although Bartlesville is no longer the headquarters, the company still has many employees in the community. In 2002, Phillips Petroleum merged with Conoco Oil Company and became ConocoPhillips.

Bartlesville was originally a sundown town where African Americans were not allowed to live. By 1907, the restriction had been lifted, and newspapers noted the town's first natural death of an African American, a man named Robert McGee.

In 1957, Bartlesville was the test site for the first experiment in pay cable television. The Bartlesville Telemovie System debuted with the film The Pajama Game, starring Doris Day, and aired it to an audience of 300 homes. The headline of the September 4, 1957, issue of Variety read, "First-Run Films Now at Home". However, after only nine months of operation, on Friday, June 6, 1958, Telemovie signed off forever.

Bartlesville was struck by an EF4 tornado that also heavily impacted Barnsdall on May 6, 2024. Debris cleanup and other recovery efforts were ongoing as of July 2024.

== Geography ==
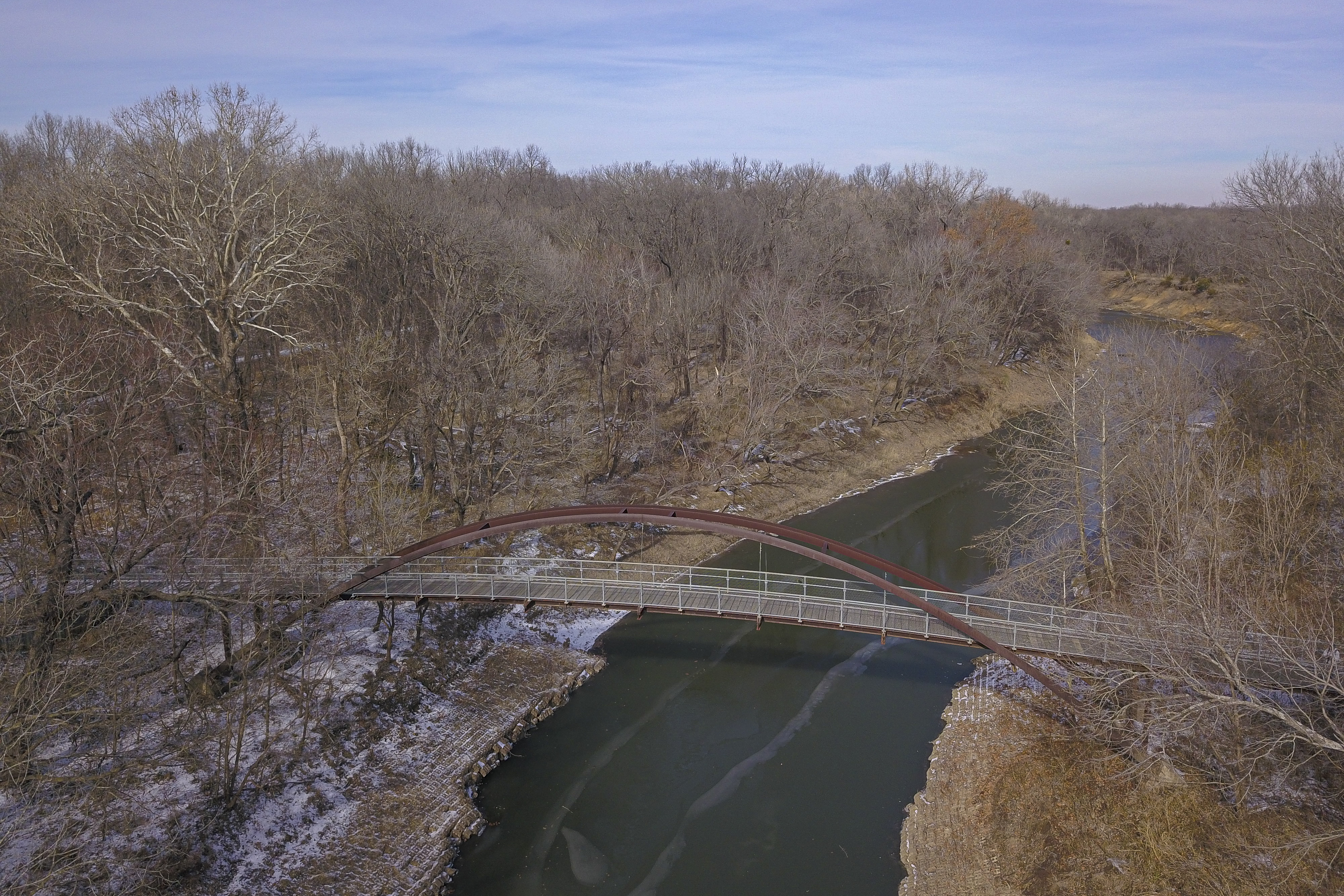
Pathfinder Parkway bridge crossing the Caney River

According to the United States Census Bureau, the city has a total area of 21.1 square miles (54.6 km^{2}), of which 21.1 square miles (54.6 km^{2}) is land and 0.04 square miles (0.1 km^{2}) (0.09%) is water.

The Caney River flows through Bartlesville, separating the downtown area from the east side. The river flooded in October 1986 as a result of unusually heavy rainfall. The city was split in half for several days, and the flood caused considerable property damage. The river broke its banks again in June 2007, cresting five feet below the 1986 level. The Pathfinder Parkway, a paved trail for walking, running, and cycling, runs alongside the Caney River.

=== Climate ===
Bartlesville is familiar with both very hot conditions in the summer with a record high of 115 °F or 46.1 °C and with very cold conditions with a record of low of −28 °F or −33.3 °C. However, even with this record of extremes, the climate of Bartlesville is considered humid subtropical (Köppen Cfa) with cool winters and hot summers, with the majority of precipitation falling in spring, between the months of April and June. Bartlesville lies in Tornado Alley, meaning that severe weather, including tornadoes, can occur. Severe weather occurs most often in the spring months, and occurs with much less frequency throughout the rest of the year. The city lies within USDA plant hardiness zone 7a (0 to 5 °F; −18 to −15 °C).

Climate data for Bartlesville, Oklahoma (Bartlesville Municipal Airport), 1991–2020 normals, extremes 1920–present
Month	Jan	Feb	Mar	Apr	May	Jun	Jul	Aug	Sep	Oct	Nov	Dec	Year
Record high °F (°C)	80 (27)	91 (33)	95 (35)	104 (40)	100 (38)	110 (43)	115 (46)	113 (45)	110 (43)	99 (37)	90 (32)	84 (29)	115 (46)
Mean maximum °F (°C)	70.3 (21.3)	75.8 (24.3)	83.9 (28.8)	87.9 (31.1)	91.1 (32.8)	95.8 (35.4)	101.9 (38.8)	102.4 (39.1)	97.3 (36.3)	89.0 (31.7)	79.4 (26.3)	71.0 (21.7)	103.7 (39.8)
Mean daily maximum °F (°C)	47.1 (8.4)	52.4 (11.3)	62.0 (16.7)	71.0 (21.7)	78.8 (26.0)	87.5 (30.8)	92.7 (33.7)	92.2 (33.4)	84.2 (29.0)	72.7 (22.6)	60.3 (15.7)	49.2 (9.6)	70.8 (21.6)
Daily mean °F (°C)	34.7 (1.5)	39.4 (4.1)	48.7 (9.3)	58.1 (14.5)	67.1 (19.5)	76.1 (24.5)	80.6 (27.0)	79.3 (26.3)	70.9 (21.6)	59.0 (15.0)	47.2 (8.4)	37.3 (2.9)	58.2 (14.6)
Mean daily minimum °F (°C)	22.3 (−5.4)	26.4 (−3.1)	35.4 (1.9)	45.1 (7.3)	55.3 (12.9)	64.6 (18.1)	68.5 (20.3)	66.4 (19.1)	57.7 (14.3)	45.3 (7.4)	34.1 (1.2)	25.3 (−3.7)	45.5 (7.5)
Mean minimum °F (°C)	5.7 (−14.6)	9.7 (−12.4)	17.6 (−8.0)	29.1 (−1.6)	39.8 (4.3)	52.5 (11.4)	59.8 (15.4)	56.3 (13.5)	42.7 (5.9)	28.8 (−1.8)	18.0 (−7.8)	9.0 (−12.8)	0.4 (−17.6)
Record low °F (°C)	−25 (−32)	−28 (−33)	−8 (−22)	9 (−13)	30 (−1)	41 (5)	48 (9)	46 (8)	29 (−2)	16 (−9)	3 (−16)	−13 (−25)	−28 (−33)
Average precipitation inches (mm)	1.53 (39)	1.88 (48)	3.00 (76)	4.29 (109)	5.68 (144)	5.29 (134)	3.65 (93)	3.39 (86)	3.43 (87)	3.63 (92)	2.36 (60)	2.12 (54)	40.25 (1,022)
Average snowfall inches (cm)	1.9 (4.8)	1.6 (4.1)	1.5 (3.8)	0.0 (0.0)	0.0 (0.0)	0.0 (0.0)	0.0 (0.0)	0.0 (0.0)	0.0 (0.0)	0.0 (0.0)	0.2 (0.51)	3.0 (7.6)	8.2 (20.81)
Average precipitation days (≥ 0.01 in)	6.1	6.4	8.7	9.4	11.2	9.3	7.7	7.6	8.1	8.1	6.7	6.1	95.4
Average snowy days (≥ 0.1 in)	0.9	0.5	0.3	0.0	0.0	0.0	0.0	0.0	0.0	0.0	0.2	0.6	2.5
Source 1: NOAA
Source 2: National Weather Service

== Demographics ==
Historical population
Census	Pop.	Note	%±
1900	698		—
1910	6,181		785.5%
1920	14,417		133.2%
1930	14,763		2.4%
1940	16,267		10.2%
1950	19,228		18.2%
1960	27,893		45.1%
1970	29,683		6.4%
1980	34,568		16.5%
1990	34,256		−0.9%
2000	34,748		1.4%
2010	35,750		2.9%
2020	37,290		4.3%

=== 2020 census ===
As of the 2020 census, Bartlesville had a population of 37,290. The median age was 38.6 years. 23.6% of residents were under the age of 18 and 19.9% of residents were 65 years of age or older. For every 100 females there were 92.9 males, and for every 100 females age 18 and over there were 88.5 males age 18 and over.

96.4% of residents lived in urban areas, while 3.6% lived in rural areas.

There were 15,136 households in Bartlesville, of which 29.7% had children under the age of 18 living in them. Of all households, 46.2% were married-couple households, 17.0% were households with a male householder and no spouse or partner present, and 30.2% were households with a female householder and no spouse or partner present. About 30.8% of all households were made up of individuals and 14.4% had someone living alone who was 65 years of age or older.

There were 17,140 housing units, of which 11.7% were vacant. Among occupied housing units, 66.3% were owner-occupied and 33.7% were renter-occupied. The homeowner vacancy rate was 2.4% and the rental vacancy rate was 12.0%.

Racial composition as of the 2020 census
Race	Percent
White	68.4%
Black or African American	3.3%
American Indian and Alaska Native	9.0%
Asian	2.4%
Native Hawaiian and Other Pacific Islander	<0.1%
Some other race	2.7%
Two or more races	14.2%
Hispanic or Latino (of any race)	7.5%

=== 2010 census ===
As of 2010 Bartlesville had a population of 35,750. The racial and ethnic composition of the population was 79.0% White (76.1% non-Hispanic), 3.1% Black or African American, 8.7% Native American, 1.4% Asian (0.4% Indian, 0.3% Chinese, 0.2% Vietnamese), 2.1% reporting some other race, 5.7% reporting two or more races and 5.9% Hispanic or Latino (4.5% Mexican, 0.3% Spanish or Spaniard, 0.2% Puerto Rican).

=== 2000 census ===
As of the census of 2000, there were 34,748 people, 14,565 households, and 9,831 families residing in the city. The population density was 1,646.4 inhabitants per square mile (635.7/km^{2}). There were 16,091 housing units at an average density of 762.4 per square mile (294.4/km^{2}). The racial makeup of the city was 82.09% White, 3.20% African American, 7.18% Native American, 0.96% Asian, 0.02% Pacific Islander, 1.02% from other races, and 5.54% from two or more races. Hispanic or Latino people of any race were 3.02% of the population.

There were 14,565 households, out of which 30.1% had children under the age of 18 living with them, 54.9% were married couples living together, 9.7% had a female householder with no husband present, and 32.5% were non-families. 29.5% of all households were made up of individuals, and 14.0% had someone living alone who was 65 years of age or older. The average household size was 2.35 and the average family size was 2.89.

In the city, the population was spread out, with 24.9% under the age of 18, 8.1% from 18 to 24, 24.8% from 25 to 44, 23.7% from 45 to 64, and 18.5% who were 65 years of age or older. The median age was 40 years. For every 100 females, there were 90.3 males. For every 100 females age 18 and over, there were 85.1 males.

The median income for a household in the city was $47,195, and the median income for a family was $56,432. The per capita income for the city was $27,417. About 17.3% of the population were below the poverty line.

== Economy ==
Oklahoma's first commercial oil well, the Nellie Johnstone No. 1, was discovered oil on 15 April 1897 along a bank of the Caney River, near Bartlesville.

Before its merger with Conoco, Phillips Petroleum Company had its headquarters in Bartlesville. After ConocoPhillips formed, the combined company established a global systems and services office in Bartlesville. ConocoPhillips spun most of its operations not related to exploration and production to form a new company, Phillips 66, in 2012. The two companies combined employ or contract with more than 3,800 people in the area. Chevron Phillips also has an office here.

Phillips Petroleum had a large presence in Bartlesville. A writer for the Tacoma (Washington) News Tribune said, "I never quite understood why the town where I spent my high school years wasn't named Phillipsburg. Nearly everything else in town was named after the Phillips Petroleum company or its founder".

The Bartlesville area has two industrial parks, the Bartlesville Industrial Park and the Sunset Industrial Park. The Bartlesville Industrial Park landed a multi-million dollar lithium-ion battery recycling plant in September 2023.

== Arts and culture ==
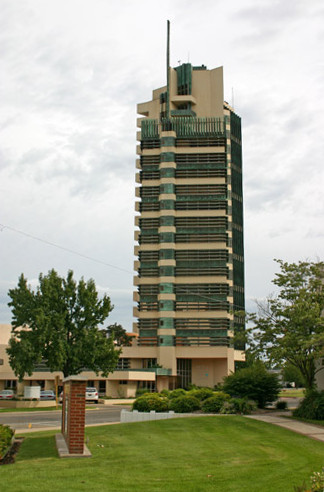
Price Tower, located downtown, was designed by Frank Lloyd Wright.

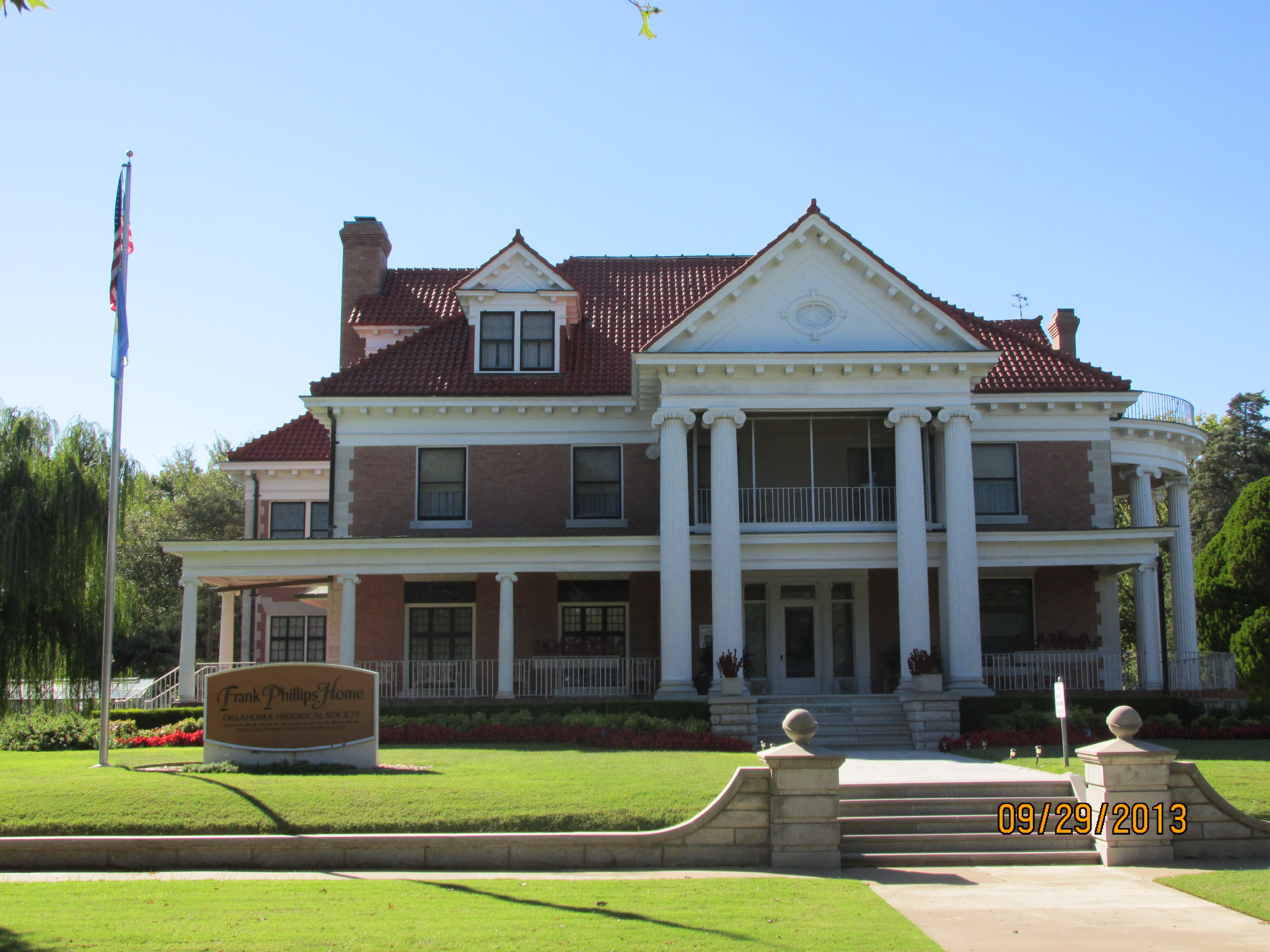
The Frank and Jane Phillips House

Price Tower, designed by Frank Lloyd Wright, stands in downtown Bartlesville. It is Wright's only realized skyscraper, and one of only two vertically oriented Wright structures extant (the other is the S.C. Johnson Wax Research Tower in Racine, Wisconsin).

The nearby Bartlesville Community Center, designed by William Wesley Peters, one of Wright's students, hosts OKM Music, an annual week-long music event in June. Begun in 1985 as the "OK Mozart" International Festival, and organized around the music of Wolfgang Amadeus Mozart, the festival featured performances of classical music, jazz, light opera, and more. World-renowned musicians who have performed at OK Mozart include Itzhak Perlman, Joyce Yang, Joshua Bell, and André Watts. Around 2018 the festival renamed itself OKM Music to signify that it was broadening its range beyond the predominantly classical music it had featured for much of its 33-year history. The Community Center also hosts the concerts presented by the Bartlesville Community Concert Association.

The city also hosts several annual festivals and shows, nearly all focused in the downtown. Sunfest is the first weekend of June. It includes an arts and crafts show, a music festival, a kids festival, and a classic cars show. A second classic air show and festival is held in the fall. An Oklahoma Indian Summer Festival is held at the Community Center downtown each fall.

Bartlesville's downtown revitalization efforts are in effect, with many blocks of the National Register Historic District, and the catalyst project, the once burned out May Brothers and 1904 Buildings, coming to completion at the downtown's center. The original Kress Building has been taken over by Bartlesville Monthly Magazine and restored. Downtown Bartlesville Inc., the Bartlesville Redevelopment Trust Authority, the Bartlesville Convention & Visitors Bureau and the Bartlesville Development Authority work in tandem to promote the area.

Frank Phillips's former home is a museum maintained by the Oklahoma Historical Society. His ranch and retreat about 10 miles (16 km) southwest of Bartlesville is called Woolaroc (a portmanteau of the words woods, lakes, rocks). A working ranch of 3,700 acres (1,500 ha), Woolaroc houses a museum exhibiting Phillips's extensive collections of Native American, western, and fine art. It holds one of the most complete private collections of Colt firearms in the world. The property includes the Phillips family's lodge and mausoleum, along with a huge wildlife preserve with herds of American bison, elk, Texas longhorn cattle, water buffalo, zebra, and more than 20 other animal species.

The Phillips Petroleum Company Museum shows the early days of petroleum production in Oklahoma and the evolution of Phillips Petroleum in that industry. Admission is free.

A Wall of Honor is inside Washington Park Mall, with names of service members listed on panels beside cabinets that display military artifacts, photos, story boards, POW/MIA listings, and other exhibits. A special display honors Lance Corporal Thomas A. Blair, Oklahoma's first casualty during the Iraq War.

Bruce Goff designed Shin'enKan ("The House of the Far Away Heart") in 1956. Built for Joe D. Price as his house and studio, it was destroyed by fire in December 1996. Bartlesville is the home of multiple other Goff buildings, a home for the Price Pipe and Supply Family by Frank Lloyd Wright, and numerous homes by the Kansas City architect Edward Buehler Delk, most notably LaQuinta. The Conference Basketball tournament for The Great American Conference is hosted in Bartlesville.

== Education ==
Oklahoma Wesleyan University, a private religious school affiliated with the Wesleyan Church, enrolls about 1,100 students at the main campus in Bartlesville, satellite locations, and online campuses. About 700 students attend the Rogers State University branch campus downtown.

Career and technical training is provided by Tri County Technology Center, which offers several programs for high-school and adult students along with short-term courses. In December 2018, Tri-County Tech was recognized for performance excellence as one of the recipients of the Malcolm Baldrige National Quality Award.

Bartlesville Public Schools are in the Bartlesville Public School District (BPSD), also known as Independent School District 30. They include six elementary (PreK-5) sites, Central and Madison middle schools (6–8), and the high school (9–12). Within Washington County, almost all of Bartlesville is in the Bartlesville school district, while a few parts in the north are covered by Dewey Public Schools. In regards to sections in Osage County, parts are covered by the Bartlesville school district, while other parts are covered by Dewey Public Schools, and Osage Hills Public School.

Private schools in Bartlesville include:

- St. John School, a Catholic school of the Roman Catholic Diocese of Tulsa;
- Coram Deo Classical Academy
- Wesleyan Christian School, which is affiliated with First Wesleyan Church
- Paths to Independence, a school for children and adults with autism.

== Media ==
Portions of the movie Killers of the Flower Moon were filmed in Bartlesville.

== Infrastructure ==
=== Transportation ===
Bartlesville is served by two US Highways and one Oklahoma state highway:

- US-75 is the primary north-south US highway through Bartlesville and Washington County.
- US-60 is the primary east-west US highway in Bartlesville and Washington County.
- SH-123.

Intercity bus service is available through Jefferson Lines.

=== Airport and aviation ===
Bartlesville Municipal Airport sits on the city's west side on US-60 in Osage County. It is a single-runway airport. Runway 17/35 is a concrete runway that is 6,850' by 100'. It has terminal and fixed-base operations and is owned by the City of Bartlesville.

In the early 1950s, the airport hosted commercial air transportation provided by Central Airlines. Commercial air transportation is now available at Tulsa International Airport, about 45 miles south.

=== Railroad ===
Bartlesville is served by the South Kansas & Oklahoma Railroad, a shortline carrier of Watco.

== Notable people ==
- Boots Adams, business executive and civic philanthropist of Bartlesville, Oklahoma
- Bud Adams, owner of the Tennessee Titans; enrolled Cherokee, grew up in Bartlesville
- Alan Armstrong, U.S. Senator
- Nancy Barrett, actress
- Omar Browning, basketball player, 1948 United States men's Olympic basketball team head coach
- Mark Costello, Oklahoma politician
- Leo G. Cox, theologian
- Patrick Cranshaw, actor
- Rosey Davis, professional baseball pitcher in the Negro Leagues
- Ree Drummond, blogger and TV cook
- Bobby Joe Green, former NFL punter
- Lyle Goodhue, scientist
- Meredith Howard Harless, performer
- Becky Hobbs, singer
- Sven Erik Holmes, United States district judge
- Ted Hsu, member of the Legislative Assembly of Ontario for the riding of Kingston and the Islands
- Todd Ames Hunter, Texas politician, born in Bartlesville in 1953
- Bob Kurland, basketball player
- Terrence Malick, cinema director
- Tyson Meade, rock singer
- Emeka Okafor, basketball player
- Frank Phillips, founder of Phillips Petroleum
- Kinga Philipps, actress/producer
- Mark Price, basketball player
- Tim Pugh, baseball player
- John Wesley Raley, minister and educator
- Allen Rucker, writer
- William Salyers, stage, screen and voice actor
- Terry Saul, Choctaw/Chickasaw artist and educator
- Louis Skurcenski, basketball player
- Gretchen Wyler, actress
- Kathleen Zellner, attorney

== In popular culture ==
The Bartlesville Barflies barbershop quartet were the inaugural champions of the Barbershop Harmony Society.

The films To the Wonder (2012) and August: Osage County (2013) were set in Bartlesville.

== See also ==
- Bartlesville Boosters, a minor league baseball team of the early 20th century
- Jo Allyn Lowe Park
- List of sundown towns in the United States
- National Register of Historic Places listings in Washington County, Oklahoma
- Pathfinder Parkway, a bicycle and jogging path which runs throughout Bartlesville
- Voice of the Martyrs headquarters
- Washington Park Mall
