= Copan, Oklahoma =

- Town
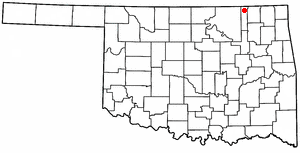
- Location of Copan, Oklahoma
- Coordinates: 36°54′02″N 95°55′31″W
- Country: United States
- State: Oklahoma
- County: Washington

Area
  - Total: 1.05 sq mi (2.73 km^{2})
  - Land: 1.05 sq mi (2.73 km^{2})
  - Water: 0 sq mi (0.00 km^{2})
- Elevation: 761 ft (232 m)

Population (2020)
  - Total: 710
  - Density: 674.2/sq mi (260.32/km^{2})
- Time zone: UTC-6 (Central (CST))
  - Summer (DST): UTC-5 (CDT)
- ZIP code: 74022
- Area codes: 539/918
- FIPS code: 40-17100
- GNIS feature ID: 2413240

Copan is a town in Washington County, Oklahoma, United States. As of the 2020 census, Copan had a population of 710.

== History ==
The Atchison, Topeka & Santa Fe Railway ("Santa Fe") built a station at this site in 1899, which it named Copan, after the city of Copán, Honduras. However, when a post office was established here in 1900, it was designated as Lawton. The settlement was renamed Weldon in 1901, but reverted to Copan in 1904. It was incorporated under that name in Indian Territory in 1906. The Copan school district was founded in 1906, as well. By 1907, the town had 305 residents.

The blossoming oil industry in Washington County spurred the growth of Copan. The Prairie Oil and Gas Company built Oklahoma's first trunk pipeline, which ran from Bartlesville, Oklahoma to Humboldt, Kansas in 1904. It also included an oil storage terminal near Copan with 107 tanks, designed to hold 35,000 barrels of crude oil. The Copan oil field was discovered in 1907, and had nearly 2,200 producing wells by 1915.

The town managed to survive and recover from major fires in 1906, 1911 and 1912. It enjoyed a spurt of growth after the creation of nearby Lake Hulah in 1951, and Lake Copan in 1983. Population reached a high of 960 in 1980, largely because the lakes increased tourism. The town economy is now largely based on travel and recreation.

== Transportation ==
=== Highway ===
Prior to the construction of Copan Dam west of town, US-75 and OK-10 came through downtown Copan. US-75 entered Washington County from High Street in nearby Caney, Kansas. As the old Highway 75 came south, it entered the town on Caney Street. As it exited south of town, it rejoined the current alignment at Washington County Road N 3975 Rd. OK-10 came out of the town of Wann, Oklahoma in northern Nowata County, entered the town at Golden Avenue, then came south on Caney Street (old US-75) for 0.3 miles, then continued west on Weldon Avenue. There were two 90-degree curves on the town's west side, the first took the highway south for 0.1 miles, the second took the highway back toward the west and had it run concurrently with Washington County W. 850 Rd and intersect Washington County N. 3970 Rd, crossed the Little Caney River, and rejoined the current alignment of OK-10 west of what is now Copan Lake into Osage County.

The current alignment of US-75 comes off of McGee Street in Caney, Kansas, continues south along the east side of Copan Lake, then continues east of Copan. The current alignment of OK-10 in Copan has its concurrency with US-75 east of town beginning at Golden Avenue, then continues south for 1.1 miles, then turns to the west, and continues over Copan Dam. It continues north, then west into Osage County.

=== Rail ===
Prior to the merger between the Burlington Northern Railroad and the Santa Fe in 1995, the line between Caney, Kansas into Tulsa, Oklahoma was the main north-south rail line through Washington County. The line came out of Caney on the town's west side, then continued south into the town of Copan. It ran roughly parallel with Caney Street, and continued on the west side of downtown Copan, then exited the town to the south. Towns and cities in Washington County that were served by the line included Dewey, Bartlesville, Ochelata, Ramona, and Vera. It continued south into Tulsa County through Collinsville, Owasso, and into Tulsa. The existing switch is located west of Greenwood Avenue where it merges with the current BNSF Cherokee Subdivision through downtown Tulsa. There were as many as eight trains a day that ran this line. It was fully signaled.

The line was to be abandoned by the newly-formed BNSF Railway. This would have left Washington County including Copan without rail service. This line also served the Montgomery County, Kansas towns of Caney, Havana, Wayside, Bolton, Independence, and Cherryvale. Watco purchased the line from BNSF post-merger, and BNSF still has trackage rights. The line is now part of the South Kansas and Oklahoma Railroad ("SKOL"), headquartered in Cherryvale. As a consequence of the merger, BNSF continued to maintain the Afton Subdivision that comes off the Cherokee Subdivision in Afton, Oklahoma, and the Fort Scott Subdivision from Springfield, Missouri. There is no Class 1 rail service in Washington County and Copan.

=== Airports ===
The nearest local airfield to Copan is Bartlesville Municipal Airport, about 15 miles. Commercial air service is available out of Tulsa International Airport, about 53 miles.

== Geography ==
Copan is 14 miles (23 km) north of Bartlesville on U.S. Highway 75.

According to the United States Census Bureau, the town has a total area of 1.0 square mile (2.6 km^{2}), all land.

== Demographics ==
Historical population
Census	Pop.	Note	%±
1910	307		—
1920	430		40.1%
1930	521		21.2%
1940	549		5.4%
1950	459		−16.4%
1960	617		34.4%
1970	675		9.4%
1980	960		42.2%
1990	809		−15.7%
2000	796		−1.6%
2010	733		−7.9%
2020	710		−3.1%
U.S. Decennial Census

=== 2020 census ===
As of the 2020 census, Copan had a population of 710. The median age was 42.9 years. 22.4% of residents were under the age of 18 and 20.6% of residents were 65 years of age or older. For every 100 females there were 91.4 males, and for every 100 females age 18 and over there were 90.0 males age 18 and over.

0.0% of residents lived in urban areas, while 100.0% lived in rural areas.

There were 295 households in Copan, of which 34.2% had children under the age of 18 living in them. Of all households, 41.4% were married-couple households, 19.7% were households with a male householder and no spouse or partner present, and 29.8% were households with a female householder and no spouse or partner present. About 25.0% of all households were made up of individuals and 15.6% had someone living alone who was 65 years of age or older.

There were 340 housing units, of which 13.2% were vacant. The homeowner vacancy rate was 3.9% and the rental vacancy rate was 7.7%.

Racial composition as of the 2020 census
Race	Number	Percent
White	562	79.2%
Black or African American	1	0.1%
American Indian and Alaska Native	82	11.5%
Asian	0	0.0%
Native Hawaiian and Other Pacific Islander	0	0.0%
Some other race	4	0.6%
Two or more races	61	8.6%
Hispanic or Latino (of any race)	22	3.1%

=== 2000 census ===
As of the census of 2000, there were 796 people, 346 households, and 232 families residing in the town. The population density was 777.7 inhabitants per square mile (300.3/km^{2}). There were 386 housing units at an average density of 377.1 per square mile (145.6/km^{2}). The racial makeup of the town was 81.53% White, 13.07% Native American, 0.38% Asian, 0.63% from other races, and 4.40% from two or more races. Hispanic or Latino of any race were 1.76% of the population.

There were 346 households, out of which 28.0% had children under the age of 18 living with them, 54.9% were married couples living together, 9.5% had a female householder with no husband present, and 32.7% were non-families. 30.9% of all households were made up of individuals, and 13.3% had someone living alone who was 65 years of age or older. The average household size was 2.30 and the average family size was 2.88.

In the town, the population was spread out, with 24.9% under the age of 18, 6.0% from 18 to 24, 24.4% from 25 to 44, 27.0% from 45 to 64, and 17.7% who were 65 years of age or older. The median age was 41 years. For every 100 females, there were 93.2 males. For every 100 females age 18 and over, there were 85.1 males.

The median income for a household in the town was $27,222, and the median income for a family was $36,563. Males had a median income of $30,938 versus $20,119 for females. The per capita income for the town was $16,324. About 6.8% of families and 12.1% of the population were below the poverty line, including 14.4% of those under age 18 and 10.4% of those age 65 or over.

== Places of Interest ==
- Copan Lake
- Hulah Lake, located 14 miles west of Copan on OK-10
- Washington Cove, a public beach on Washington County W. 850 Rd
- Wah-Sha-She State Park, located on OK-10 on the east end of Copan Dam
- Post Oak Recreation Area, located on the west shores of Copan Lake west of the dam on OK-10
- Washington Cove Campground, located west of Copan on Washington County N. 3970 Rd
- Copan Rodeo Arena, located on Golden Avenue, west of US-75
- Copan Park, located on N. Caney and E. Lawton Avenue next to the City Hall and Fire Department
- Copan Wildlife Management Area
