= 1948 United States presidential election in Oklahoma =

- November 2, 1948

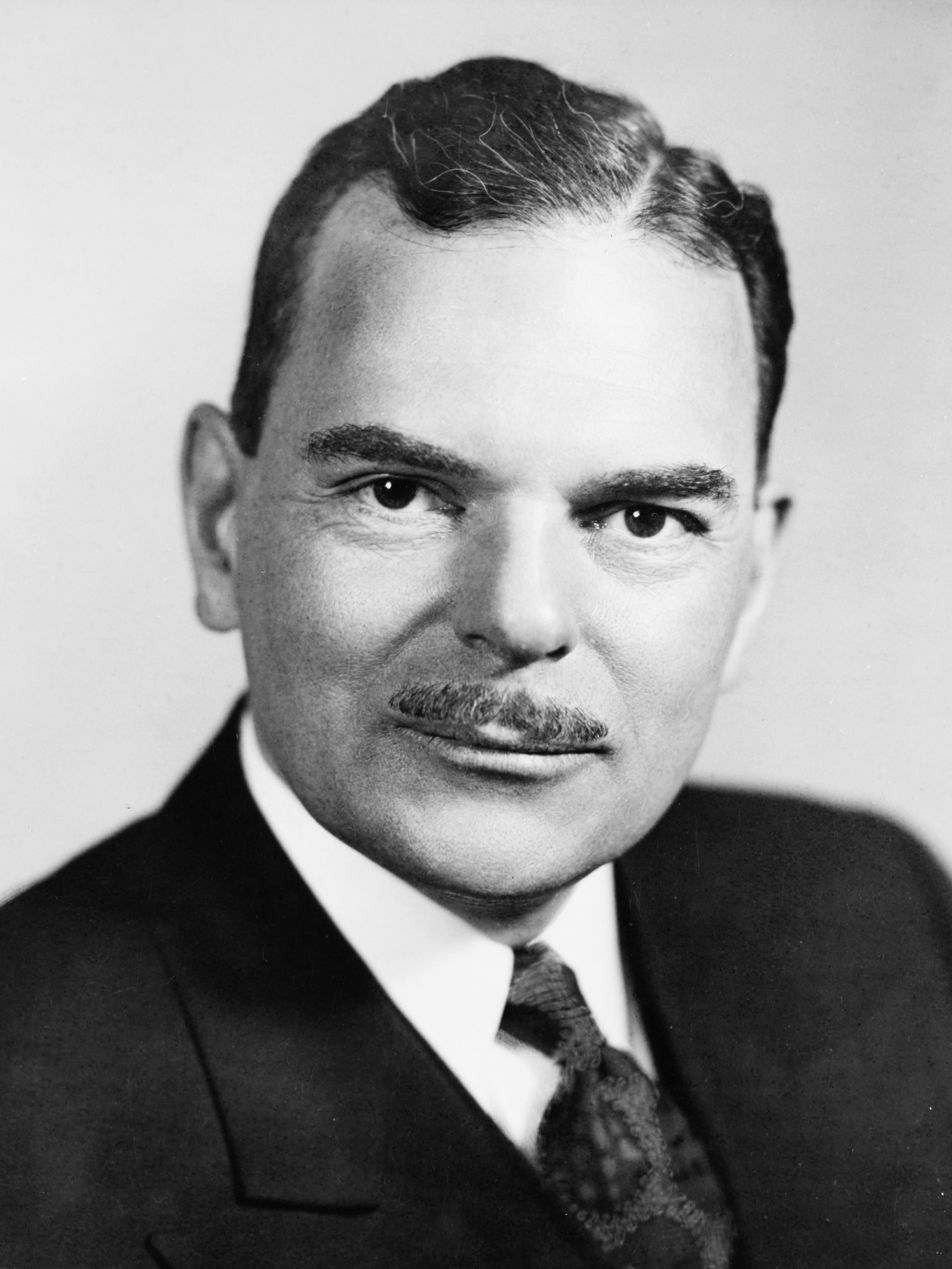
Nominee	Harry S. Truman	Thomas E. Dewey
Party	Democratic	Republican
Home state	Missouri	New York
Running mate	Alben W. Barkley	Earl Warren
Electoral vote	10	0
Popular vote	452,782	268,817
Percentage	62.75%	37.25%
County results
Truman
50–60%
60–70%
70–80%
80–90%
Dewey
50–60%
60–70%

The 1948 United States presidential election in Oklahoma took place on November 2, 1948. All forty-eight states were part of the 1948 United States presidential election. Voters chose ten electors to the Electoral College, who voted for president and vice president.

Incumbent Democratic President Harry S. Truman won Oklahoma by a landslide 25.5 percentage points. This made Oklahoma the fourth most Democratic state in the nation, and 21 percent more Democratic than the nation as a whole. This makes it the third best performance (after Franklin D. Roosevelt's 1932 and 1936 landslides) of any Democratic nominee in the state.

Until this election, Oklahoma was a reliably Democratic state, with the party winning all but two of the first eleven presidential elections in the state. Since 1952, Oklahoma has only voted Democratic once, when Lyndon B. Johnson won in a nationwide landslide in 1964.

== Background ==
In Dwight D. Eisenhower's landslide elections of 1952 and 1956, Adlai Stevenson II lost every antebellum free-soil or postbellum state, however Oklahoma remained more Democratic than the nation as a whole. In 1960, John F. Kennedy lost most postbellum states, including Oklahoma, due to anti-Catholic sentiment. In 1964, Lyndon Johnson became the last Democratic presidential candidate to carry the state, with only Jimmy Carter in 1976 subsequently reaching even 45% of the vote, and no Democrat after 2000 reaching 35% of the vote or even winning a single county in the state.

== Results ==
1948 United States presidential election in Oklahoma
Party	Candidate	Votes	Percentage	Electoral votes
Democratic	Harry S. Truman (incumbent)	452,782	62.75%	10
Republican	Thomas E. Dewey	268,817	37.25%	0
Totals		721,599	100.0%	10
Voter turnout (Voting age)		52.5%		

=== Results by county ===
County	Harry S. Truman Democratic		Thomas E. Dewey Republican		Margin		Total votes cast
County	#	%	#	%	#	%	Total votes cast
Adair	3,067	56.03%	2,407	43.97%	660	12.06%	5,474
Alfalfa	1,838	39.93%	2,765	60.07%	−927	−20.14%	4,603
Atoka	3,104	75.03%	1,033	24.97%	2,071	50.06%	4,137
Beaver	1,596	52.92%	1,420	47.08%	176	5.84%	3,016
Beckham	4,544	77.62%	1,310	22.38%	3,234	55.24%	5,854
Blaine	2,595	47.79%	2,835	52.21%	−240	−4.42%	5,430
Bryan	7,748	85.01%	1,366	14.99%	6,382	70.02%	9,114
Caddo	8,110	68.13%	3,793	31.87%	4,317	36.26%	11,903
Canadian	5,568	59.89%	3,729	40.11%	1,839	19.78%	9,297
Carter	9,474	81.52%	2,147	18.48%	7,327	63.04%	11,621
Cherokee	4,249	60.41%	2,785	39.59%	1,464	20.82%	7,034
Choctaw	4,750	82.09%	1,036	17.91%	3,714	64.18%	5,786
Cimarron	894	57.90%	650	42.10%	244	15.80%	1,544
Cleveland	6,556	64.10%	3,671	35.90%	2,885	28.20%	10,227
Coal	2,124	82.07%	464	17.93%	1,660	64.14%	2,588
Comanche	7,955	74.06%	2,787	25.94%	5,168	48.12%	10,742
Cotton	2,613	77.98%	738	22.02%	1,875	55.96%	3,351
Craig	4,182	59.84%	2,807	40.16%	1,375	19.68%	6,989
Creek	9,198	58.47%	6,532	41.53%	2,666	16.94%	15,730
Custer	4,618	64.26%	2,568	35.74%	2,050	28.52%	7,186
Delaware	3,157	57.40%	2,343	42.60%	814	14.80%	5,500
Dewey	2,049	57.83%	1,494	42.17%	555	15.66%	3,543
Ellis	1,420	48.27%	1,522	51.73%	−102	−3.46%	2,942
Garfield	8,217	44.25%	10,352	55.75%	−2,135	−11.50%	18,569
Garvin	6,779	80.13%	1,681	19.87%	5,098	60.26%	8,460
Grady	8,136	73.84%	2,882	26.16%	5,254	47.68%	11,018
Grant	2,126	46.25%	2,471	53.75%	−345	−7.50%	4,597
Greer	3,044	81.02%	713	18.98%	2,331	62.04%	3,757
Harmon	2,340	89.79%	266	10.21%	2,074	79.58%	2,606
Harper	1,281	51.20%	1,221	48.80%	60	2.40%	2,502
Haskell	3,206	69.76%	1,390	30.24%	1,816	39.52%	4,596
Hughes	5,492	76.62%	1,676	23.38%	3,816	53.24%	7,168
Jackson	5,450	85.52%	923	14.48%	4,527	71.04%	6,373
Jefferson	3,326	85.68%	556	14.32%	2,770	71.36%	3,882
Johnston	2,936	83.41%	584	16.59%	2,352	66.82%	3,520
Kay	10,119	52.98%	8,982	47.02%	1,137	5.96%	19,101
Kingfisher	2,488	45.91%	2,931	54.09%	−443	−8.18%	5,419
Kiowa	4,263	73.59%	1,530	26.41%	2,733	47.18%	5,793
Latimer	2,536	73.40%	919	26.60%	1,617	46.80%	3,455
LeFlore	6,786	70.64%	2,821	29.36%	3,965	41.28%	9,607
Lincoln	4,913	55.76%	3,898	44.24%	1,015	11.52%	8,811
Logan	4,109	51.84%	3,817	48.16%	292	3.68%	7,926
Love	2,191	89.80%	249	10.20%	1,942	79.60%	2,440
Major	1,227	33.22%	2,467	66.78%	−1,240	−33.56%	3,694
Marshall	2,455	83.96%	469	16.04%	1,986	67.92%	2,924
Mayes	4,201	59.55%	2,854	40.45%	1,347	19.10%	7,055
McClain	3,451	79.17%	908	20.83%	2,543	58.34%	4,359
McCurtain	6,223	85.08%	1,091	14.92%	5,132	70.16%	7,314
McIntosh	3,674	71.81%	1,442	28.19%	2,232	43.62%	5,116
Murray	3,054	79.28%	798	20.72%	2,256	58.56%	3,852
Muskogee	13,860	67.77%	6,592	32.23%	7,268	35.54%	20,452
Noble	2,770	53.27%	2,430	46.73%	340	6.54%	5,200
Nowata	2,688	55.92%	2,119	44.08%	569	11.84%	4,807
Okfuskee	3,335	67.25%	1,624	32.75%	1,711	34.50%	4,959
Oklahoma	59,954	59.89%	40,161	40.11%	19,793	19.78%	100,115
Okmulgee	10,467	70.56%	4,368	29.44%	6,099	41.12%	14,835
Osage	7,156	64.43%	3,951	35.57%	3,205	28.86%	11,107
Ottawa	7,243	62.73%	4,304	37.27%	2,939	25.46%	11,547
Pawnee	2,721	50.65%	2,651	49.35%	70	1.30%	5,372
Payne	7,390	56.03%	5,799	43.97%	1,591	12.06%	13,189
Pittsburg	9,576	76.80%	2,893	23.20%	6,683	53.60%	12,469
Pontotoc	7,750	77.20%	2,289	22.80%	5,461	54.40%	10,039
Pottawatomie	10,220	68.22%	4,760	31.78%	5,460	36.44%	14,980
Pushmataha	2,977	79.05%	789	20.95%	2,188	58.10%	3,766
Roger Mills	2,176	81.04%	509	18.96%	1,667	62.08%	2,685
Rogers	4,197	59.57%	2,849	40.43%	1,348	19.14%	7,046
Seminole	8,122	70.35%	3,423	29.65%	4,699	40.70%	11,545
Sequoyah	4,449	68.17%	2,077	31.83%	2,372	36.34%	6,526
Stephens	6,702	77.83%	1,909	22.17%	4,793	55.66%	8,611
Texas	2,693	61.64%	1,676	38.36%	1,017	23.28%	4,369
Tillman	4,071	79.37%	1,058	20.63%	3,013	58.74%	5,129
Tulsa	38,548	47.33%	42,892	52.67%	−4,344	−5.34%	81,440
Wagoner	3,389	55.97%	2,666	44.03%	723	11.94%	6,055
Washington	5,508	47.71%	6,036	52.29%	−528	−4.58%	11,544
Washita	4,326	72.55%	1,637	27.45%	2,689	45.10%	5,963
Woods	2,882	50.10%	2,871	49.90%	11	0.20%	5,753
Woodward	2,180	47.69%	2,391	52.31%	−211	−4.62%	4,571
Totals	452,782	62.75%	268,817	37.25%	183,965	25.50%	721,599

==== Counties that flipped from Republican to Democratic ====
- Adair
- Beaver
- Cimarron
- Delaware
- Dewey
- Harper
- Kay
- Lincoln
- Logan
- Mayes
- Nowata
- Noble
- Pawnee
- Payne
- Rogers
- Woods
- Wagoner

== Analysis ==
The Progressive Party obtained the necessary 5,000 signatures to appear on the ballot in two days. Gerald L. K. Smith filed a lawsuit in an attempt to remove the party from the ballot. The state election board rejected Wallace's electors stating that the Progressives were not a political party as the Oklahoma Secretary of State had not approved their non-communist affidavit prior to the filing deadline. The secretary of state was not allowed to accept these affidavits until May 2 while the filing deadline was April 30. The Oklahoma Supreme Court ruled five to two against the Progressives in Cooper v. Cartwright. The Progressives appealed to the Supreme Court of the United States, but John Abt dropped the lawsuit due to the "difficulty of getting grounds for a federal suit".

Truman won all but 10 counties in the state; of the 10, only Grant has voted Democratic since. This is the last occasion in which the contiguous counties of Texas, Beaver, Harper and Woods – which now form one of the most conservative regions in the nation – have voted Democratic, as well as the last time that Kay County has. As a result, this is also the last time that a Democrat has swept every county in the Oklahoma Panhandle. This is also the most recent election in which Oklahoma voted for a different candidate than neighboring Kansas.

== See also ==
- United States presidential elections in Oklahoma

== Works cited ==
- Schmidt, Karl (1960). Henry A. Wallace: Quixotic Crusade 1948. Syracuse University Press. ISBN 978-0-8156-0020-6.
