= 2008 United States presidential election in Oklahoma =

- November 4, 2008

Nominee	John McCain	Barack Obama
Party	Republican	Democratic
Home state	Arizona	Illinois
Running mate	Sarah Palin	Joe Biden
Electoral vote	7	0
Popular vote	960,165	502,496
Percentage	65.65%	34.35%

McCain
40–50%
50–60%
60–70%
70–80%
80–90%
90–100%
Obama
40–50%
50–60%
60–70%
70–80%
80–90%
90–100%
Tie/no votes
Tie
No votes
President before election
George W. Bush
Republican
Elected President
Barack Obama
Democratic

The 2008 United States presidential election in Oklahoma took place on November 4, 2008, and was part of the 2008 United States presidential election. Voters chose seven representatives, or electors, to the Electoral College, who voted for president and vice president.

Oklahoma was won by Republican nominee John McCain with a 31.3% margin of victory. Prior to the election, all 17 news organizations considered this a state McCain would win, or otherwise considered as a safe red state. A strongly conservative state located in the Bible Belt where evangelical Christianity plays a large role, Oklahoma has trended heavily Republican in recent years. Having voted for the Republican presidential nominee in every election since 1968, Oklahoma once again showcased its status as a Republican stronghold in 2008 with Republican John McCain capturing 65.65% of the vote. It was also the only state where McCain won every county and was even one of the five states along with Louisiana, Arkansas, Tennessee, and West Virginia in which McCain outperformed Bush's margin of victory from four years earlier, albeit slightly.

This was also only the second election since its statehood in which Oklahoma supported a different candidate than Virginia, with 1920 being the first. However, this has happened in all elections since, as Oklahoma has voted consistently Republican while Virginia has voted consistently Democratic. This was one of five states where McCain won over 60% of the vote, the others being Alabama, Utah, Wyoming, and Idaho.

== Primaries ==
- 2008 Oklahoma Republican presidential primary
- 2008 Oklahoma Democratic presidential primary

== Campaign ==
=== Predictions ===
There were 16 news organizations who made state-by-state predictions of the election. Here are their last predictions before election day:

Source	Ranking
D.C. Political Report	Likely R
Cook Political Report	Solid R
The Takeaway	Solid R
Electoral-vote.com	Solid R
Washington Post	Solid R
Politico	Solid R
RealClearPolitics	Solid R
FiveThirtyEight	Solid R
CQ Politics	Solid R
The New York Times	Solid R
CNN	Safe R
NPR	Solid R
MSNBC	Solid R
Fox News	Likely R
Associated Press	Likely R
Rasmussen Reports	Safe R

=== Polling ===
McCain won every single pre-election poll, and each with a double-digit margin of victory. The final three polls averaged McCain leading 62% to 34%.

=== Fundraising ===
John McCain raised a total of $2,050,335 in the state. Barack Obama raised $1,711,069.

=== Advertising and visits ===
Obama spent $613,515. McCain and his interest groups spent just $6,565. Neither campaign visited the state.

== Analysis ==
Oklahoma gave John McCain his strongest showing in the 2008 election, with a rounded percentage of 66% (65.65%) going to him. Oklahoma was also the only state where every single county voted for McCain. Although the results were similar to 2004, when George W. Bush swept every county in the state with 65.57% of the vote, McCain's margin of victory was slightly better - 0.08% more - in 2008. Oklahoma was one of five states where McCain outperformed George W. Bush, the other four being Arkansas, Louisiana, Tennessee, and West Virginia.

Oklahoma, despite the large concentration of Native Americans in the state, remains one of the most reliably Republican states in the country. Although Democrats still had a majority of registered voters (as well as the governorship) at the time, the state's Democrats are very conservative by national standards. Oklahoma is part of the Bible Belt, and voters in the state have a strong penchant for being values voters; that is, they are strongly and deeply conservative on social issues such as abortion and gay rights. McCain's selection of the socially conservative Governor Sarah Palin of Alaska proved to be an excellent fit for Oklahoma. Obama was at a disadvantage beforehand in Oklahoma during the primary season when voters in Oklahoma backed Hillary Rodham Clinton with 54.76% of the vote compared to Obama's 31.19% and a significant amount (10.24%) going to John Edwards. Clinton won every county in the Oklahoma Democratic Primary except for Oklahoma County, home of Oklahoma City which Obama just narrowly carried. Most of Oklahoma's Democratic establishment were early endorsers of Hillary Clinton as well. Another setback for Obama was that U.S. Representative Dan Boren, the only Democrat from Oklahoma's five-member delegation in the U.S. House of Representatives, refused to endorse Obama.

Another key to McCain's victory was the highly populated counties of Tulsa County, which he won with over 62%, and Oklahoma County, which he won with over 58%. He also dominated the heavily Republican Oklahoma Panhandle by an almost four-to-one margin. Despite the Republican landslide, Obama did improve upon John Kerry's performance in Oklahoma City and Tulsa. However, this was more than canceled out by his extremely weak showing in Southeast Oklahoma, historically the most Democratic region in the state. This socially conservative but fiscally liberal area, known as "Little Dixie," still votes Democratic at the local level and state levels. It also warmly supported Bill Clinton of neighboring Arkansas in 1992 and 1996; Clinton's populism struck a chord among the region's voters. Democratic nominees from John Kerry on, on the other hand, have proven spectacularly bad fits for the region and the state as a whole. Obama lost many counties in Southeast Oklahoma by more than two-to-one margins.

Also, Oklahoma was the only state in the country that did not have a third-party candidate on the ballot, mostly because the state has the toughest ballot access laws in the country. Obama became the first Democrat to win without winning a single county in Oklahoma.

During the same election, incumbent Republican U.S. Senator James Inhofe was solidly reelected over Democratic State Senator Andrew Rice. Inhofe received 56.68% while Rice took in 39.18% and Independent Stephen P. Wallace received the remaining 4.14%. At the state level, Republicans made gains in the Oklahoma Legislature, picking up four seats in the Oklahoma House of Representatives and two seats in the Oklahoma Senate which gave the GOP control of the state legislature for the first time since statehood.

== Results ==
2008 United States presidential election in Oklahoma
Party	Candidate	Running mate	Votes	Percentage	Electoral votes
Republican	John McCain	Sarah Palin	960,165	65.65%	7
Democratic	Barack Obama	Joe Biden	502,496	34.35%	0
Totals			1,462,661	100.00%	7
Voter turnout (voting age population)					54.8%

=== By county ===
County	John McCain Republican		Barack Obama Democratic		Margin		Total
County	#	%	#	%	#	%	Total
Adair	4,638	69.33%	2,052	30.67%	2,586	38.66%	6,690
Alfalfa	2,023	83.11%	411	16.89%	1,612	66.22%	2,434
Atoka	3,511	71.93%	1,370	28.07%	2,141	43.86%	4,881
Beaver	2,199	89.25%	265	10.75%	1,934	78.50%	2,464
Beckham	5,772	78.03%	1,625	21.97%	4,147	56.06%	7,397
Blaine	3,101	75.41%	1,011	24.59%	2,090	50.82%	4,112
Bryan	9,307	67.77%	4,426	32.23%	4,881	35.54%	13,733
Caddo	6,413	65.33%	3,404	34.67%	3,009	30.66%	9,817
Canadian	36,428	76.12%	11,426	23.88%	25,002	52.24%	47,854
Carter	13,241	70.27%	5,603	29.73%	7,638	40.54%	18,844
Cherokee	9,186	56.08%	7,194	43.92%	1,992	12.16%	16,380
Choctaw	3,730	66.73%	1,860	33.27%	1,870	33.46%	5,590
Cimarron	1,119	88.04%	152	11.96%	967	76.08%	1,271
Cleveland	64,749	62.00%	39,681	38.00%	25,108	24.00%	104,430
Coal	1,672	73.59%	600	26.41%	1,072	47.18%	2,272
Comanche	20,127	58.77%	14,120	41.23%	6,007	17.54%	34,247
Cotton	1,793	72.21%	690	27.79%	1,103	44.42%	2,483
Craig	3,858	65.05%	2,073	34.95%	1,785	30.10%	5,931
Creek	20,187	70.82%	8,318	29.18%	11,869	41.64%	28,505
Custer	7,842	74.67%	2,660	25.33%	5,182	49.34%	10,502
Delaware	10,277	66.90%	5,085	33.10%	5,192	33.80%	15,362
Dewey	1,857	84.29%	346	15.71%	1,511	68.58%	2,203
Ellis	1,627	85.23%	282	14.77%	1,345	70.46%	1,909
Garfield	17,067	75.48%	5,545	24.52%	11,522	50.96%	22,612
Garvin	7,710	71.80%	3,028	28.20%	4,682	43.60%	10,738
Grady	15,195	73.35%	5,520	26.65%	9,675	46.70%	20,715
Grant	1,836	78.13%	514	21.87%	1,322	56.26%	2,350
Greer	1,548	73.23%	566	26.77%	982	46.46%	2,114
Harmon	757	69.45%	333	30.55%	424	38.90%	1,090
Harper	1,342	85.86%	221	14.14%	1,121	71.72%	1,563
Haskell	3,207	68.51%	1,474	31.49%	1,733	37.02%	4,681
Hughes	3,134	64.71%	1,709	35.29%	1,425	29.42%	4,843
Jackson	6,719	74.80%	2,264	25.20%	4,455	49.60%	8,983
Jefferson	1,652	67.24%	805	32.76%	847	34.48%	2,457
Johnston	2,708	68.44%	1,249	31.56%	1,459	36.88%	3,957
Kay	13,230	70.78%	5,463	29.22%	7,767	41.56%	18,693
Kingfisher	5,372	84.19%	1,009	15.81%	4,363	68.38%	6,381
Kiowa	2,537	67.42%	1,226	32.58%	1,311	34.84%	3,763
Latimer	2,860	68.54%	1,313	31.46%	1,547	37.08%	4,173
LeFlore	11,605	69.32%	5,136	30.68%	6,469	38.64%	16,741
Lincoln	10,470	74.92%	3,504	25.08%	6,966	49.84%	13,974
Logan	12,556	68.71%	5,717	31.29%	6,839	37.42%	18,273
Love	2,589	67.32%	1,257	32.68%	1,332	34.64%	3,846
Major	2,956	85.16%	515	14.84%	2,441	70.32%	3,471
Marshall	3,730	69.42%	1,643	30.58%	2,087	38.84%	5,373
Mayes	10,234	64.03%	5,749	35.97%	4,485	28.06%	15,983
McClain	11,193	75.92%	3,551	24.08%	7,642	51.84%	14,744
McCurtain	7,745	73.49%	2,794	26.51%	4,951	46.98%	10,539
McIntosh	4,903	59.63%	3,320	40.37%	1,583	19.26%	8,223
Murray	3,746	70.18%	1,592	29.82%	2,154	40.36%	5,338
Muskogee	15,289	57.51%	11,294	42.49%	3,995	15.02%	26,583
Noble	3,881	76.78%	1,174	23.22%	2,707	53.56%	5,055
Nowata	3,031	68.24%	1,411	31.76%	1,620	36.48%	4,442
Okfuskee	2,643	64.10%	1,480	35.90%	1,163	28.20%	4,123
Oklahoma	163,172	58.41%	116,182	41.59%	46,990	16.82%	279,354
Okmulgee	8,727	58.50%	6,191	41.50%	2,536	17.00%	14,918
Osage	12,160	61.86%	7,498	38.14%	4,662	23.72%	19,658
Ottawa	6,905	61.80%	4,268	38.20%	2,637	23.60%	11,173
Pawnee	4,533	68.72%	2,063	31.28%	2,470	37.44%	6,596
Payne	18,435	63.49%	10,601	36.51%	7,834	26.98%	29,036
Pittsburg	11,752	68.29%	5,457	31.71%	6,295	36.58%	17,209
Pontotoc	9,750	68.36%	4,512	31.64%	5,238	36.72%	14,262
Pottawatomie	17,753	69.18%	7,910	30.82%	9,843	38.36%	25,663
Pushmataha	3,208	71.72%	1,265	28.28%	1,943	43.44%	4,473
Roger Mills	1,502	83.96%	287	16.04%	1,215	67.92%	1,789
Rogers	27,743	72.03%	10,772	27.97%	16,971	44.06%	38,515
Seminole	5,600	65.29%	2,977	34.71%	2,623	30.58%	8,577
Sequoyah	9,466	68.00%	4,454	32.00%	5,012	36.00%	13,920
Stephens	14,394	76.03%	4,538	23.97%	9,856	52.06%	18,932
Texas	5,336	85.25%	923	14.75%	4,413	70.50%	6,259
Tillman	2,195	67.81%	1,042	32.19%	1,153	35.62%	3,237
Tulsa	158,363	62.23%	96,133	37.77%	62,230	24.46%	254,496
Wagoner	21,441	70.88%	8,810	29.12%	12,631	41.76%	30,251
Washington	16,457	72.29%	6,308	27.71%	10,149	44.58%	22,765
Washita	3,724	77.97%	1,052	22.03%	2,672	55.94%	4,776
Woods	3,043	77.71%	873	22.29%	2,170	55.42%	3,916
Woodward	6,404	82.59%	1,350	17.41%	5,054	65.18%	7,754
Totals	960,165	65.65%	502,496	34.35%	457,669	31.30%	1,462,661

=== By congressional district ===
McCain carried all five congressional districts in Oklahoma, including one held by a Democrat.

District	McCain	Obama	Representative
1st	64.21%	35.79%	John Sullivan
2nd	65.59%	34.41%	Dan Boren
3rd	72.82%	27.18%	Frank Lucas
4th	66.37%	33.63%	Tom Cole
5th	59.32%	40.68%	Mary Fallin

== Electors ==
Technically the voters of Oklahoma cast their ballots for electors: representatives to the Electoral College. Oklahoma is allocated seven electors because it has five congressional districts and two senators. All candidates who appear on the ballot or qualify to receive write-in votes must submit a list of seven electors, who pledge to vote for their candidate and their running mate. Whoever wins the majority of votes in the state is awarded all seven electoral votes. Their chosen electors then vote for president and vice president. Although electors are pledged to their candidate and running mate, they are not obligated to vote for them. An elector who votes for someone other than their candidate is known as a faithless elector.

The electors of each state and the District of Columbia met on December 15, 2008, to cast their votes for president and vice president. The Electoral College itself never meets as one body. Instead, the electors from each state and the District of Columbia met in their respective capitols.

The following were the members of the Electoral College from the state. All seven were pledged to John McCain and Sarah Palin:

1. Virginia Chrisco
2. Gail Stice
3. Pete Katzdorn
4. Robert Cleveland
5. Mary Phyllis Gorman
6. Bunny Chambers
7. Diane Murphy Gunther

The slate for the Democrats, which was not elected, consisted of Sally Freeman Frasier, Gene A. Wallace, Anita R. Norman, Tim Mauldin, Robert Lemon, David Walters, Walter W. Jenny Jr.

== See also ==
- United States presidential elections in Oklahoma
- Presidency of Barack Obama
