= Gloss Mountain State Park =

State park in Oklahoma, United States

Gloss Mountains State Park
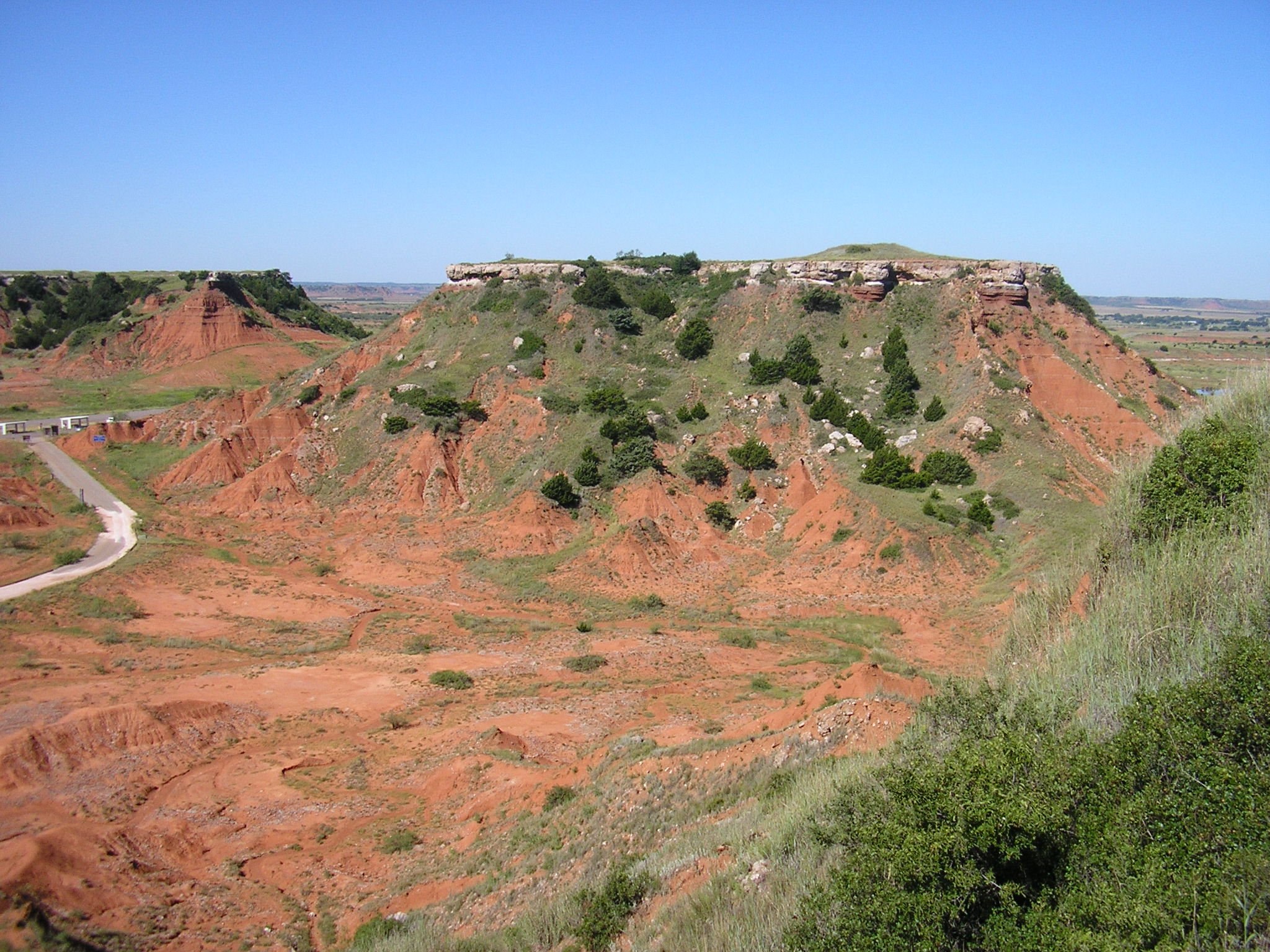
- Gloss Mountains

- Location within Oklahoma
- Location: Major County, Oklahoma, United States
- Nearest city: Fairview, OK
- Coordinates: 36.366667°N 98.578889°W
- Area: 640 acres (260 ha)
- Established: 1977 (opened 1997)
- Governing body: Oklahoma Tourism and Recreation Department
- Website: www.travelok.com/listings/view.profile/id.3030

Glass Mountains State Park (also called Gloss Mountain State Park) is an Oklahoma state park located in Major County, Oklahoma, near the city of Fairview, Oklahoma. (Note: The park is 6 miles (9.7 km) north of Fairview on U. S. Highway 60 and 5.5 miles (8.9 km) west on U.S. Highway 412.) A recreational-educational park that is accessible 365 days a year for hiking and picnicking, from sunrise to sunset. There are no campsites or other overnight accommodations in the park. Facilities include a restroom, pavilions, picnic areas, grills, public water supply, handicap trail to historical marker, and a hiking trail from base parking lot to the top of Cathedral Mountain and across the mesa to view the valley floor and Lone Peak Mountain. Points of interest include land geography, geological formations, Selenite gypsum, scenery and wildlife. This range is also known as the Glass Mountains.

== History ==
The park operates under a partnership between the state of Oklahoma's Department of Tourism and Recreation and the citizens of Fairview, Oklahoma. In 1977, the state appropriated $125,000 to match $125,000 from the Federal Land and Water Conservation Fund to buy 640 acres along U.S. Highway 412 for a public park. However, the state could not fund the completion of the proposed park, so it leased out the land for grazing until 1997. In that year, representatives from the Tourism and Recreation Department met with local residents, who formed a conservancy to manage the park. The local residents maintain the facilities, the state provided the land. The conservancy also pays for a gatekeeper who opens and locks the park at night.

== See also ==
Glass Mountains
