= Washington County, Oklahoma =

County in Oklahoma, United States

- County
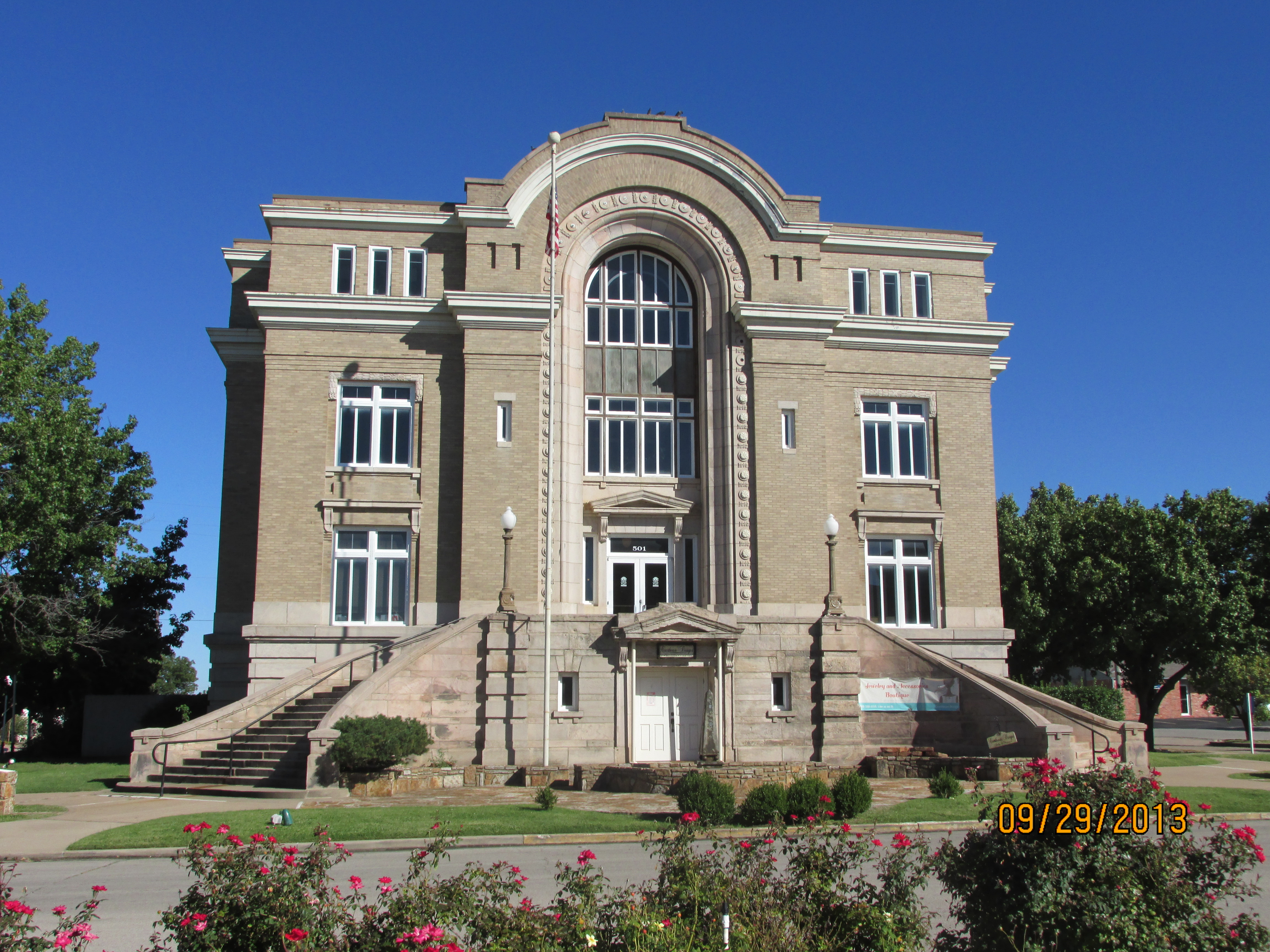
- Old Washington County Courthouse in Bartlesville

- Location within the U.S. state of Oklahoma
- Coordinates: 36°44′50″N 95°58′50″W
- Country: United States
- State: Oklahoma
- Founded: 1907
- Named for: George Washington
- Seat: Bartlesville
- Largest city: Bartlesville

Area
  - Total: 424 sq mi (1,100 km^{2})
  - Land: 415 sq mi (1,070 km^{2})
  - Water: 8.8 sq mi (23 km^{2}) 2.1%

Population (2020)
  - Total: 52,455
  - Estimate (2025): 54,037 ▲
  - Density: 120/sq mi (46/km^{2})
- Congressional district: 2nd
- Website: washingtoncountyok.gov

Washington County is a county located in the northeastern part of the U.S. state of Oklahoma. As of the 2020 census, the population was 52,455. Its county seat is Bartlesville. Named for President George Washington, it is the smallest county in Oklahoma in total area, adjacent to the largest county in Oklahoma, Osage County. Washington County comprises the Bartlesville, OK micropolitan statistical area, which is also included in the Tulsa-Muskogee-Bartlesville, OK combined statistical area. It is located along the border with Kansas.

== History ==
The Osage ceded their land claims in 1825, and the Federal Government allowed the Western Cherokee to settle in this area in 1828. The 1835 Treaty of New Echota confirmed Cherokee ownership of the land. The area now covered by Washington County was part of the Cherokee Saline District between 1840 and 1856 and the Cooweescoowee District from 1856 to 1906.

The first post office was established in 1859 at the confluence of Butler Creek and the Caney River by James L. Butler. Known as Little Verdigris, the settlement also had a trading post and a school. The Civil War caused most of the inhabitants to move away and the post office closed in 1866. In 1867, the Cherokees sold 157,600 acres to the Eastern Delaware.

In 1870, Nelson Carr built a grist mill along the Caney River, which he used to grind seed corn. In 1875, he sold the mill to Jacob Bartles (for whom the town of Bartlesville would be named), who modified the mill to produce wheat flour. Other important agricultural crops included potatoes, sorghum and oats, as well as prairie hay and pecans. Cotton production was attempted in the early 1900s, but the soil proved unsuitable and this crop was soon discontinued.

The first commercial oil well in Oklahoma, designated as Nellie Johnstone Number One, was drilled near Bartlesville in 1897. According to the Encyclopedia of Oklahoma History and Culture, the industry developed slowly because of communal land ownership by the Cherokees, the lack of crude oil markets, and lack of reliable transportation. Bartlesville became an oil boom town only after 1900, when the nearby Osage County oil fields were developed and railroads were built into the area. In 1900, Phoenix Oil Company built a pipeline from Osage County to Bartlesville's Atchison, Topeka and Santa Fe Railway depot, where there was an oil loading facility. Oil was shipped from there to a refinery in Neodesha, Kansas in the same year. Washington County fields were developed soon afterward. The Bartlesville Field reached peak development during 1904 to 1906; the Bartlesville-Dewey Field in 1905 and the Copan, Canary, Hogshooter, and Wann fields were located in 1907. Several oil companies set up headquarters in the county, most notably Phillips Petroleum in Bartlesville.

Railroads came to this area at the turn of the 20th century. The Atchison, Topeka and Santa Fe Railway opened a line from Owen to Owasso, Oklahoma in 1899. The Missouri, Kansas and Texas Railroad opened a line from Stevens, Kansas to Dewey, Oklahoma in 1901-2 and another line from Hominy, Oklahoma to Bartlesville in 1903–04.

== Geography ==
According to the U.S. Census Bureau, the county has a total area of 424 square miles (1,100 km^{2}), of which 415 square miles (1,070 km^{2}) is land and 8.8 square miles (23 km^{2}) (2.1%) is water. It is the second-smallest county in Oklahoma by land area and smallest by total area. It lies in the Eastern Lowlands physiographic region, and is drained by the Caney River. Lakes and reservoirs include Copan Lake, Silver Lake and Bar-Dew Lake.

=== Adjacent counties ===
- Montgomery County, Kansas (north)
- Nowata County (east)
- Rogers County (southeast)
- Tulsa County (south)
- Osage County (west)
- Chautauqua County, Kansas (northwest)

== Demographics ==
Historical population
Census	Pop.	Note	%±
1910	17,484		—
1920	27,002		54.4%
1930	27,777		2.9%
1940	30,559		10.0%
1950	32,880		7.6%
1960	42,347		28.8%
1970	42,277		−0.2%
1980	48,113		13.8%
1990	48,066		−0.1%
2000	48,996		1.9%
2010	50,976		4.0%
2020	52,455		2.9%
2025 (est.)	54,037	▲	3.0%
U.S. Decennial Census; 1790-1960 1900-1990; 1990-2000 2010-2019 2020

=== 2020 census ===
As of the 2020 census, the county had a population of 52,455. Of the residents, 23.5% were under the age of 18 and 20.3% were 65 years of age or older; the median age was 40.2 years. For every 100 females there were 94.8 males, and for every 100 females age 18 and over there were 90.9 males.

The racial makeup of the county was 68.9% White, 2.6% Black or African American, 10.3% American Indian and Alaska Native, 1.9% Asian, 2.3% from some other race, and 14.0% from two or more races. Hispanic or Latino residents of any race comprised 6.4% of the population.

There were 21,071 households in the county, of which 30.0% had children under the age of 18 living with them and 27.8% had a female householder with no spouse or partner present. About 28.9% of all households were made up of individuals and 14.0% had someone living alone who was 65 years of age or older.

There were 23,713 housing units, of which 11.1% were vacant. Among occupied housing units, 70.6% were owner-occupied and 29.4% were renter-occupied. The homeowner vacancy rate was 2.0% and the rental vacancy rate was 11.4%.

=== 2010 census ===
As of the 2010 United States census, there were 50,976 people, 21,036 households, and 14,123 families residing in the county. The population density was 45/km^{2} (120/mi^{2}). There were 23,451 housing units at an average density of 55.3 per square mile (21.4/km^{2}). The racial makeup of the county was 93.9% white, 2.4% black or African American, 10.3% Native American, 1.1% Asian, less than 0.1% Pacific Islander, 1.7% from other races, and 6.1% from two or more races. Five percent of the population were Hispanic or Latino of any race.

As of 2010, there were 21,036 households, out of which 30.1% had children under the age of 18 living with them, 52.1% were married couples living together, 11% had a female householder with no husband present, 4% had a male householder with no husband present, and 32.9% were non-families. Individuals living alone accounted for 28.7% of households and individuals who were 65 years of age or older living alone accounted for 12.9%. The average household size was 2.39 and the average family size was 2.91. In the county, the population was spread out, with 23.4% under the age of 18, 8.1% from 18 to 24, 22.8% from 25 to 44, 27.9% from 45 to 64, and 17.8% who were 65 years of age or older. The median age was 41.4 years. For every 100 females, there were 93.7 males. For every 100 females age 18 and over, there were 109.8 males.

As of 2010, the median income for a household in the county was $35,816, and the median income for a family was $43,514. Males had a median income of $34,201 versus $22,389 for females. The per capita income for the county was $20,250. About 8.70% of families and 11.90% of the population were below the poverty line, including 15.70% of those under age 18 and 7.80% of those age 65 or over. According to 2021 census estimates, its median household income was $55,216.

== Politics ==
Voter Registration and Party Enrollment as of October 31, 2021
Party	Number of Voters	Percentage
Republican	20,565	60.82%
Democratic	6,414	18.97%
Others	6,835	20.21%
Total	33,814	100%

United States presidential election results for Washington County, Oklahoma
Year	Republican		Democratic		Third party(ies)	
Year	No.	%	No.	%	No.	%
1908	1,528	49.82%	1,409	45.94%	130	4.24%
1912	1,477	43.63%	1,561	46.12%	347	10.25%
1916	1,727	44.00%	1,839	46.85%	359	9.15%
1920	4,105	57.83%	2,805	39.51%	189	2.66%
1924	4,579	55.17%	3,487	42.01%	234	2.82%
1928	7,258	73.48%	2,563	25.95%	56	0.57%
1932	4,713	40.71%	6,863	59.29%	0	0.00%
1936	5,201	45.51%	6,202	54.27%	26	0.23%
1940	7,347	53.72%	6,289	45.99%	40	0.29%
1944	6,533	56.12%	5,090	43.72%	18	0.15%
1948	6,036	52.29%	5,508	47.71%	0	0.00%
1952	11,334	64.50%	6,238	35.50%	0	0.00%
1956	12,488	69.31%	5,529	30.69%	0	0.00%
1960	13,700	71.43%	5,479	28.57%	0	0.00%
1964	12,382	59.09%	8,571	40.91%	0	0.00%
1968	12,812	62.36%	4,641	22.59%	3,091	15.05%
1972	16,347	79.74%	3,658	17.84%	495	2.41%
1976	14,560	67.19%	6,898	31.83%	212	0.98%
1980	16,563	70.47%	5,854	24.91%	1,086	4.62%
1984	19,043	77.20%	5,476	22.20%	148	0.60%
1988	14,613	67.30%	6,971	32.11%	129	0.59%
1992	11,342	47.93%	6,593	27.86%	5,728	24.21%
1996	11,605	56.08%	6,732	32.53%	2,357	11.39%
2000	13,788	66.47%	6,644	32.03%	312	1.50%
2004	16,551	70.69%	6,862	29.31%	0	0.00%
2008	16,457	72.29%	6,308	27.71%	0	0.00%
2012	15,668	73.91%	5,532	26.09%	0	0.00%
2016	15,825	71.21%	5,048	22.71%	1,351	6.08%
2020	17,076	72.66%	5,790	24.64%	635	2.70%
2024	16,836	72.65%	5,793	25.00%	545	2.35%

== Communities ==
=== Cities ===
- Bartlesville (county seat)
- Dewey

=== Towns ===
- Copan
- Ochelata
- Ramona
- Vera

== Transportation ==
=== Major highways ===
- US 60
- US 75
- SH-10
- SH-11
- SH-123

== NRHP sites ==
The following sites in Washington County are listed on the National Register of Historic Places

- Bartlesville Downtown Historic District, Bartlesville
- Bartlesville Civic Center, Bartlesville
- Dewey Hotel, Dewey
- C.A. Comer House, Dewey
- LaQuinta, Bartlesville
- Nellie Johnstone No. 1, Bartlesville
- Old Washington County Courthouse, Bartlesville
- Frank and Jane Phillips House, Bartlesville
- Price Tower, Bartlesville
