= Glass Mountains =

Rock formations in Oklahoma, United States

Coordinates: 36.353646°N 98.584805°W

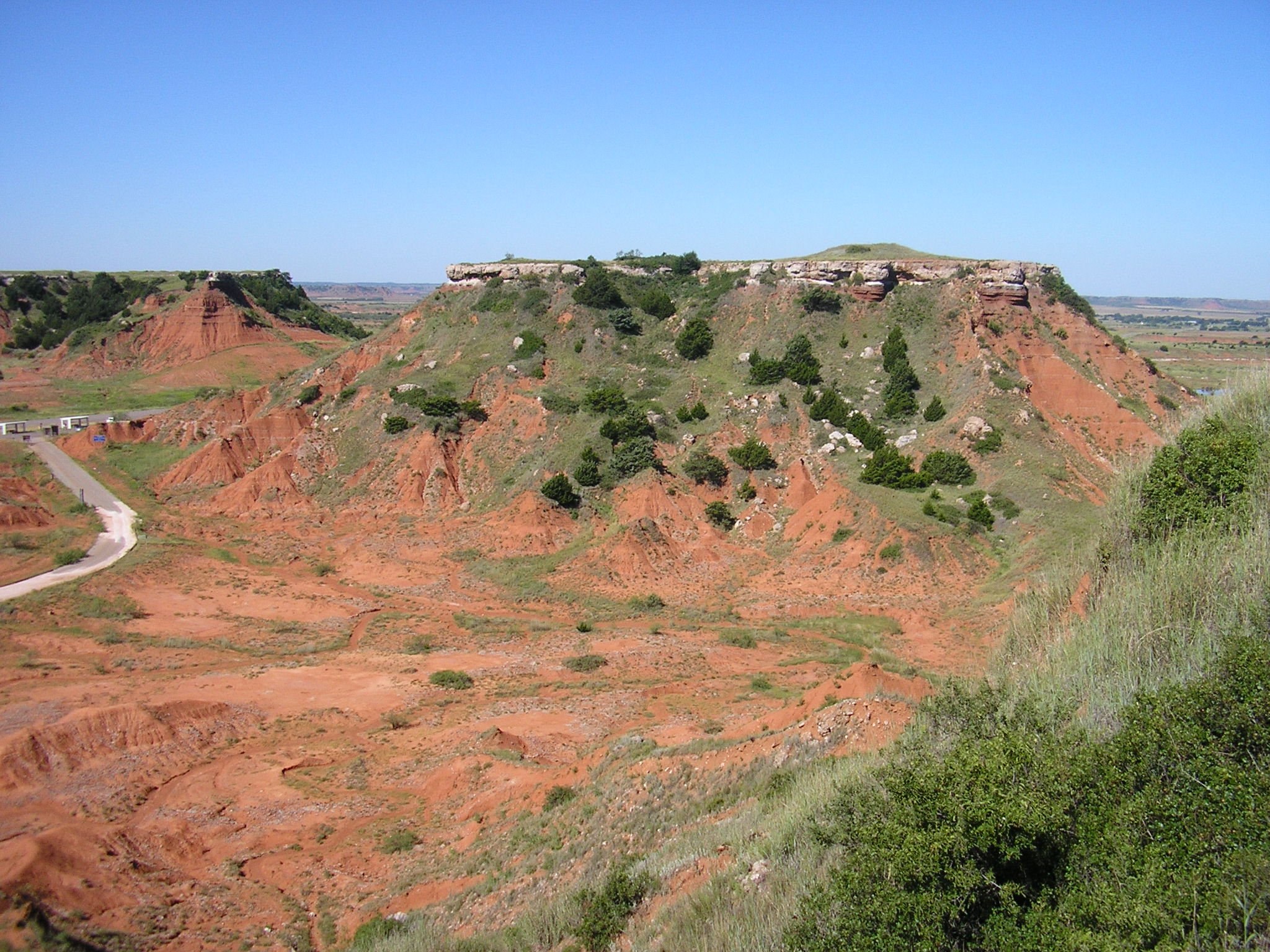
Glass Mountains seen from the top of a mesa at Glass Mountains State Park (2007)

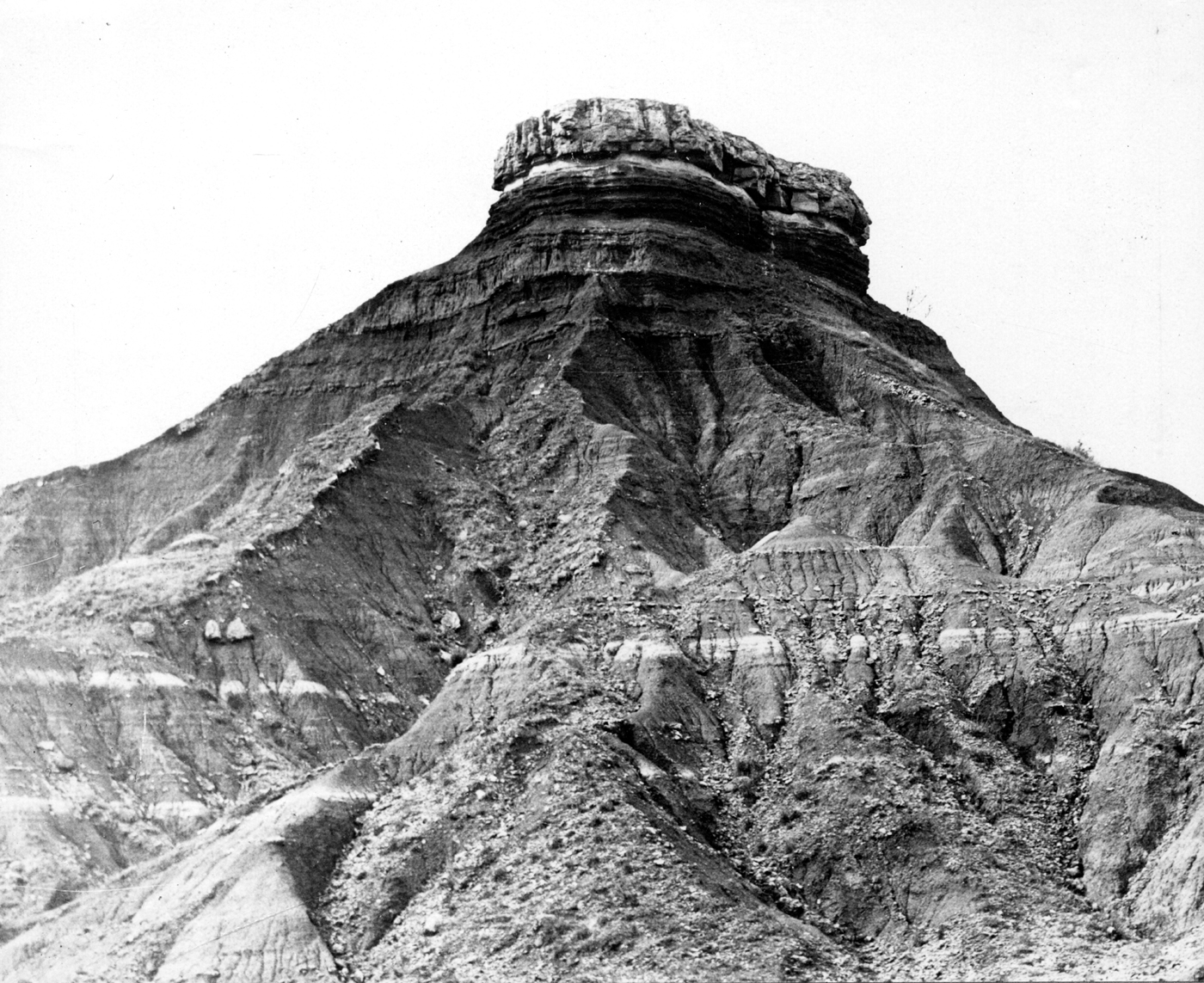
Glass Mountain, capped with massive gypsum, Major County, Oklahoma. (USGS photo by George Irving Adams, 1900)

The Glass Mountains (also known as Gloss Mountains or Gloss Hills) are a group of landforms located in northwestern Oklahoma. They are not actually mountains, but a series of mesas and buttes that are part of the Blaine Escarpment that extends from the Permian red beds in Major County. (Note: Glass Mountains is the "official name", but local residents still use the name Gloss Mountains.) They rise 150 feet (46 m) to 200 feet (61 m) above the surface of the plains, and the highest elevation in the formation is about 1,600 feet (490 m) above sea level. The Glass Mountains stretch west along U.S. Route 412 from Orienta south of the Cimarron River. The name comes from the sparkling selenite crystals on the slopes and tops of the mesas. (Note: Selenite is a form of the mineral gypsum, which is composed of calcium silicate (CaSO_{4}), also known as isinglass.)

== Geology ==
During the Quaternary Period, the most recent one million years, Pleistocene terraces were laid down along the major rivers in this area of the United States, with Holocene alluvium that are at least 100 feet (30 m) thick and contain sand, gravel, silt, clay and volcanic ash.

The next layer was formed during the Permian Period, which occurred 230 to 270 million years ago. This consists of red sandstone and shale which is 1,000 feet (300 m) to 4,500 feet (1,400 m) thick, with gypsum on the outcroppings. The Permian "redbeds" are subdivided into the Cimarronian Series (2850 feet) at the base, overlain by the Custerian Series (400 feet, top eroded). Deposits of Flowerpot shale (180 feet (55 m) to 430 feet (130 m)) that consists mainly of red-brown illitic-chloritic shale, are found at this area.

== History ==
The first American explorers referred to this feature as the "Shining Mountains," when they saw the formation in 1821. The name Glass Mountains has been attributed to an explorer named Thomas James. James visited this area during 1821, while on a trading expedition along the Cimarron River. In 1875, a transcription error by a mapmaker resulted in the name Gloss Mountains which is still a somewhat common name for the mountains.

The region became part of the Cherokee Outlet during the 19th Century. In 1891, botanist George Walter Stevens, started collecting specimens in the Glass Mountains domain for his dissertation. The University of Oklahoma Bebb Herbarium holds 4,500 samples that Stevens collected statewide. Two cacti he may have collected in the Glass Mountains area are Echinocereus caespitosus and Opuntia phaecantha.

== State park ==
The state of Oklahoma operates the 640 acres (260 ha) Gloss Mountain State Park, 6 miles (9.7 km) west of Orienta on a mesa along Highway 412. The park allows climbers to hike to the top of the mesa via a path and stairs. Picnic tables and an informational kiosk have been installed, and a pond known as Rattlesnake Lake is nearby.

== See also ==
- Gloss Mountain State Park
