= Orienta, Oklahoma =

Orienta
- Unincorporated community
- Location within the state of Oklahoma Orienta (the United States)
- Coordinates: 36°21′36″N 98°28′26″W
- Country: United States
- State: Oklahoma
- County: Major
- Elevation: 1,247 ft (380 m)
- Time zone: UTC-6 (Central (CST))
  - Summer (DST): UTC-5 (CDT)
- GNIS feature ID: 1100704

Orienta is an unincorporated community located at the junction of U.S. Routes 60 and 412 in Major County, Oklahoma, United States. It lies north of Fairview, east of the Glass Mountains, and south of the Cimarron River. The post office was established March 12, 1901, and took its name from the Kansas City, Mexico and Orient Railway along which it was built.
