= Isabella, Oklahoma =

- Census-designated place
- Location within Oklahoma Location within the United States
- Coordinates: 36°14′07″N 98°20′07″W
- Country: United States
- State: Oklahoma
- County: Major

Area
  - Total: 2.98 sq mi (7.73 km^{2})
  - Land: 2.98 sq mi (7.73 km^{2})
  - Water: 0 sq mi (0.00 km^{2})
- Elevation: 1,299 ft (396 m)

Population (2020)
  - Total: 114
  - Density: 38.2/sq mi (14.75/km^{2})
- Time zone: UTC-6 (Central (CST))
  - Summer (DST): UTC-5 (CDT)
- ZIP Code: 73747
- Area code: 580
- GNIS feature ID: 2629923
- FIPS code: 40-37350

Isabella is a census-designated place and unincorporated community in Major County, Oklahoma, United States. The population was 114 at the time of the 2020 census, down from 136 in 2010. Isabella has a post office with ZIP Code 73747.

== Geography ==
Isabella is in southeastern Major County, west of Oklahoma State Highway 8. It is 10 miles (16 km) by road east-southeast of Fairview, the county seat, and 9 miles (14 km) north of Okeene.

According to the U.S. Census Bureau, the Isabella CDP has an area of 2.99 square miles (7.74 km^{2}), of which 0.001 square miles (0.003 km^{2}), or 0.03%, are water.

== Demographics ==
Historical population
Census	Pop.	Note	%±
2010	136		—
2020	114		−16.2%
U.S. Decennial Census

=== 2020 census ===
As of the 2020 census, Isabella had a population of 114. The median age was 47.2 years. 27.2% of residents were under the age of 18 and 18.4% of residents were 65 years of age or older. For every 100 females there were 128.0 males, and for every 100 females age 18 and over there were 159.4 males age 18 and over.

0.0% of residents lived in urban areas, while 100.0% lived in rural areas.

There were 49 households in Isabella, of which 22.4% had children under the age of 18 living in them. Of all households, 65.3% were married-couple households, 24.5% were households with a male householder and no spouse or partner present, and 8.2% were households with a female householder and no spouse or partner present. About 30.6% of all households were made up of individuals and 8.1% had someone living alone who was 65 years of age or older.

There were 56 housing units, of which 12.5% were vacant. The homeowner vacancy rate was 0.0% and the rental vacancy rate was 0.0%.

Racial composition as of the 2020 census
Race	Number	Percent
White	105	92.1%
Black or African American	0	0.0%
American Indian and Alaska Native	1	0.9%
Asian	0	0.0%
Native Hawaiian and Other Pacific Islander	0	0.0%
Some other race	5	4.4%
Two or more races	3	2.6%
Hispanic or Latino (of any race)	13	11.4%

=== 2010 census ===
As of the 2010 United States census, Isabella had a population of 136.
