= Copan Dam =

- Interactive map of Copan Dam
- Country: United States
- Location: Washington County, Oklahoma
- Coordinates: 36°53′05″N 95°58′03″W
- Construction began: 1972
- Opening date: 1983
- Built by: United States Army Corps of Engineers
- Designed by: United States Army Corps of Engineers

Dam and spillways
- Impounds: Little Caney River
- Height (foundation): 73 ft (22 m)
- Length: 7,730 ft (2,360 m)

Reservoir
- Creates: Copan Lake
- Total capacity: 338,000 acre⋅ft (417,000,000 m^{3}) Max 43,400 acre⋅ft (53,500,000 m^{3}) Normal
- Surface area: 7.6 mi^{2} (20 km^{2})

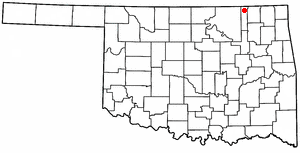
location of Copan, northeastern Oklahoma

Copan Dam is a dam in the US state of Oklahoma, Washington County, in the northeastern part of the state.

Construction of the earthen dam began in 1972 and was completed in 1983 by the United States Army Corps of Engineers, with a height of 73 feet (22 m) and a length of 7,730 feet (2,360 m) long at its crest. It impounds Little Caney River for flood control and municipal drinking water. The dam is owned and operated by the Corps of Engineers.

The reservoir it creates, Copan Lake, has a water surface of 7.6 square miles (20 km^{2}), has a maximum capacity of 338,000 acre-feet (417,000,000 m^{3}), and normal capacity of 43,400 acre-feet (53,500,000 m^{3}).

Copan Wildlife Area is a wildlife management area that was leased to the Kansas Department of Wildlife and Parks from the Corps of Engineers in 1981. The wildlife area is part of an overall project with the Copan Reservoir, located in Oklahoma. It covers 2,360 acres (9,600,000 m^{2}) in Montgomery County, Kansas.
