= 1936 United States presidential election in Oklahoma =

- November 3, 1936

All 11 Oklahoma votes to the Electoral College

Nominee	Franklin D. Roosevelt	Alf Landon
Party	Democratic	Republican
Home state	New York	Kansas
Running mate	John Nance Garner	Frank Knox
Electoral vote	11	0
Popular vote	501,069	245,122
Percentage	66.83%	32.69%
County results
Roosevelt
50–60%
60–70%
70–80%
80–90%
Landon
50–60%
President before election
Franklin D. Roosevelt
Democratic
Elected President
Franklin D. Roosevelt
Democratic

The 1936 United States presidential election in Oklahoma took place on November 3, 1936, as part of the 1936 United States presidential election. Voters chose 11 representatives, or electors, to the Electoral College, who voted for president and vice president.

Oklahoma was won by incumbent President Franklin D. Roosevelt (D–New York), running with Vice President John Nance Garner, with 66.83 percent of the popular vote, against Governor Alf Landon (R–Kansas), running with Frank Knox, with 32.69 percent of the popular vote.

To date, the 1936 election is the last in which the following counties voted for a Democratic presidential candidate: Alfalfa, Blaine, Ellis, Garfield, Kingfisher, Tulsa, Washington and Woodward.

== Results ==
1936 United States presidential election in Oklahoma
Party	Candidate	Votes	%
Democratic	Franklin D. Roosevelt (inc.)	501,069	66.83%
Republican	Alf Landon	245,122	32.69%
Socialist	Norman Thomas	2,221	0.30%
Prohibition	D. Leigh Colvin	1,328	0.18%
Total votes		749,740	100%

=== Results by county ===
County	Franklin D. Roosevelt Democratic		Alf Landon Republican		Norman Thomas Socialist		D. Leigh Colvin Prohibition		Margin		Total votes cast
County	#	%	#	%	#	%	#	%	#	%	Total votes cast
Adair	3,257	54.54%	2,699	45.19%	9	0.15%	7	0.12%	558	9.34%	5,972
Alfalfa	3,398	56.39%	2,573	42.70%	17	0.28%	38	0.63%	825	13.69%	6,026
Atoka	3,173	73.40%	1,141	26.39%	6	0.14%	3	0.07%	2,032	47.00%	4,323
Beaver	2,502	64.77%	1,340	34.69%	8	0.21%	13	0.34%	1,162	30.08%	3,863
Beckham	5,372	79.23%	1,352	19.94%	34	0.50%	22	0.32%	4,020	59.29%	6,780
Blaine	4,242	58.95%	2,877	39.98%	49	0.68%	28	0.39%	1,365	18.97%	7,196
Bryan	8,106	85.43%	1,362	14.35%	5	0.05%	15	0.16%	6,744	71.08%	9,488
Caddo	8,358	61.15%	5,205	38.08%	77	0.56%	29	0.21%	3,153	23.07%	13,669
Canadian	6,135	64.52%	3,325	34.97%	32	0.34%	16	0.17%	2,810	29.55%	9,508
Carter	9,387	80.44%	2,247	19.26%	23	0.20%	12	0.10%	7,140	61.19%	11,669
Cherokee	3,966	57.44%	2,917	42.25%	17	0.25%	4	0.06%	1,049	15.19%	6,904
Choctaw	4,624	78.24%	1,269	21.47%	14	0.24%	3	0.05%	3,355	56.77%	5,910
Cimarron	1,342	70.26%	555	29.06%	6	0.31%	7	0.37%	787	41.20%	1,910
Cleveland	6,304	69.87%	2,643	29.30%	55	0.61%	20	0.22%	3,661	40.58%	9,022
Coal	2,550	80.70%	603	19.08%	6	0.19%	1	0.03%	1,947	61.61%	3,160
Comanche	7,026	69.29%	3,039	29.97%	64	0.63%	11	0.11%	3,987	39.32%	10,140
Cotton	3,842	76.23%	1,181	23.43%	14	0.28%	3	0.06%	2,661	52.80%	5,040
Craig	4,377	59.52%	2,964	40.30%	7	0.10%	6	0.08%	1,413	19.21%	7,354
Creek	12,540	63.01%	7,257	36.46%	74	0.37%	32	0.16%	5,283	26.54%	19,903
Custer	5,093	67.68%	2,386	31.71%	30	0.40%	16	0.21%	2,707	35.97%	7,525
Delaware	3,398	56.21%	2,632	43.54%	11	0.18%	4	0.07%	766	12.67%	6,045
Dewey	2,980	61.28%	1,846	37.96%	22	0.45%	15	0.31%	1,134	23.32%	4,863
Ellis	2,493	64.80%	1,324	34.42%	22	0.57%	8	0.21%	1,169	30.39%	3,847
Garfield	11,142	59.51%	7,457	39.83%	22	0.12%	102	0.54%	3,685	19.68%	18,723
Garvin	6,276	78.12%	1,700	21.16%	40	0.50%	18	0.22%	4,576	56.96%	8,034
Grady	9,025	74.59%	3,013	24.90%	37	0.31%	24	0.20%	6,012	49.69%	12,099
Grant	3,955	62.84%	2,307	36.65%	10	0.16%	22	0.35%	1,648	26.18%	6,294
Greer	3,745	82.82%	766	16.94%	6	0.13%	5	0.11%	2,979	65.88%	4,522
Harmon	2,570	88.26%	331	11.37%	8	0.27%	3	0.10%	2,239	76.89%	2,912
Harper	1,836	63.07%	1,068	36.69%	4	0.14%	3	0.10%	768	26.38%	2,911
Haskell	3,961	64.47%	2,182	35.51%	1	0.02%	0	0.00%	1,779	28.96%	6,144
Hughes	5,990	74.60%	2,032	25.31%	5	0.06%	3	0.04%	3,958	49.29%	8,030
Jackson	5,435	82.71%	1,095	16.66%	22	0.33%	19	0.29%	4,340	66.05%	6,571
Jefferson	3,719	77.92%	1,032	21.62%	12	0.25%	10	0.21%	2,687	56.30%	4,773
Johnston	3,099	80.18%	743	19.22%	12	0.31%	11	0.28%	2,356	60.96%	3,865
Kay	11,846	63.52%	6,671	35.77%	45	0.24%	87	0.47%	5,175	27.75%	18,649
Kingfisher	4,081	61.35%	2,539	38.17%	8	0.12%	24	0.36%	1,542	23.18%	6,652
Kiowa	5,624	76.40%	1,684	22.88%	38	0.52%	15	0.20%	3,940	53.53%	7,361
Latimer	2,923	68.20%	1,344	31.36%	14	0.33%	5	0.12%	1,579	36.84%	4,286
Le Flore	8,061	67.35%	3,894	32.53%	4	0.03%	10	0.08%	4,167	34.81%	11,969
Lincoln	5,903	51.75%	5,452	47.80%	36	0.32%	16	0.14%	451	3.95%	11,407
Logan	5,425	53.74%	4,609	45.66%	30	0.30%	31	0.31%	816	8.08%	10,095
Love	2,227	82.88%	440	16.38%	15	0.56%	5	0.19%	1,787	66.51%	2,687
Major	1,929	45.88%	2,230	53.04%	23	0.55%	22	0.52%	-301	-7.16%	4,204
Marshall	2,840	86.64%	415	12.66%	17	0.52%	6	0.18%	2,425	73.98%	3,278
Mayes	3,920	59.19%	2,690	40.62%	5	0.08%	8	0.12%	1,230	18.57%	6,623
McClain	4,092	77.21%	1,191	22.47%	10	0.19%	7	0.13%	2,901	54.74%	5,300
McCurtain	5,089	81.80%	1,119	17.99%	12	0.19%	1	0.02%	3,970	63.82%	6,221
McIntosh	3,898	61.06%	2,470	38.69%	10	0.16%	6	0.09%	1,428	22.37%	6,384
Murray	3,181	78.99%	823	20.44%	11	0.27%	12	0.30%	2,358	58.55%	4,027
Muskogee	13,344	67.30%	6,452	32.54%	14	0.07%	19	0.10%	6,892	34.76%	19,829
Noble	3,901	61.19%	2,461	38.60%	8	0.13%	5	0.08%	1,440	22.59%	6,375
Nowata	3,512	57.73%	2,552	41.95%	11	0.18%	9	0.15%	960	15.78%	6,084
Okfuskee	4,843	68.68%	2,162	30.66%	40	0.57%	7	0.10%	2,681	38.02%	7,052
Oklahoma	50,946	67.36%	24,312	32.15%	230	0.30%	143	0.19%	26,634	35.22%	75,631
Okmulgee	12,061	70.56%	4,975	29.11%	32	0.19%	25	0.15%	7,086	41.46%	17,093
Osage	10,090	67.02%	4,917	32.66%	28	0.19%	21	0.14%	5,173	34.36%	15,056
Ottawa	7,658	61.70%	4,697	37.84%	42	0.34%	15	0.12%	2,961	23.86%	12,412
Pawnee	4,031	57.06%	2,961	41.92%	56	0.79%	16	0.23%	1,070	15.15%	7,064
Payne	8,081	62.54%	4,783	37.02%	39	0.30%	18	0.14%	3,298	25.52%	12,921
Pittsburg	9,974	72.97%	3,651	26.71%	23	0.17%	20	0.15%	6,323	46.26%	13,668
Pontotoc	8,079	79.71%	2,015	19.88%	32	0.32%	10	0.10%	6,064	59.83%	10,136
Pottawatomie	12,187	71.82%	4,703	27.72%	51	0.30%	27	0.16%	7,484	44.11%	16,968
Pushmataha	3,389	75.23%	1,097	24.35%	17	0.38%	2	0.04%	2,292	50.88%	4,505
Roger Mills	3,383	76.38%	989	22.33%	46	1.04%	11	0.25%	2,394	54.05%	4,429
Rogers	4,290	57.58%	3,119	41.86%	30	0.40%	12	0.16%	1,171	15.72%	7,451
Seminole	11,695	74.17%	4,001	25.37%	56	0.36%	16	0.10%	7,694	48.80%	15,768
Sequoyah	4,281	62.13%	2,609	37.87%	0	0.00%	0	0.00%	1,672	24.27%	6,890
Stephens	6,390	79.17%	1,636	20.27%	38	0.47%	7	0.09%	4,754	58.90%	8,071
Texas	3,229	72.22%	1,223	27.35%	10	0.22%	9	0.20%	2,006	44.87%	4,471
Tillman	5,268	82.18%	1,126	17.57%	9	0.14%	7	0.11%	4,142	64.62%	6,410
Tulsa	41,256	58.65%	28,759	40.88%	254	0.36%	74	0.11%	12,497	17.77%	70,343
Wagoner	2,977	58.18%	2,119	41.41%	17	0.33%	4	0.08%	858	16.77%	5,117
Washington	6,202	54.27%	5,201	45.51%	15	0.13%	11	0.10%	1,001	8.76%	11,429
Washita	5,205	74.05%	1,792	25.49%	20	0.28%	12	0.17%	3,413	48.56%	7,029
Woods	4,179	63.62%	2,346	35.71%	14	0.21%	30	0.46%	1,833	27.90%	6,569
Woodward	3,361	57.64%	2,430	41.67%	20	0.34%	20	0.34%	931	15.97%	5,831
Total	501,069	66.83%	245,122	32.69%	2,221	0.30%	1,328	0.18%	255,947	34.14%	749,740

==== Counties that flipped Democratic to Republican ====
- Major

== See also ==
- United States presidential elections in Oklahoma
