= 1932 United States presidential election in Oklahoma =

- November 8, 1932

All 11 Oklahoma votes to the Electoral College

Nominee	Franklin D. Roosevelt	Herbert Hoover
Party	Democratic	Republican
Home state	New York	California
Running mate	John Nance Garner	Charles Curtis
Electoral vote	11	0
Popular vote	516,468	188,165
Percentage	73.30%	26.70%
County results
Roosevelt
50–60%
60–70%
70–80%
80–90%
90–100%
President before election
Herbert Hoover
Republican
Elected President
Franklin D. Roosevelt
Democratic

The 1932 United States presidential election in Oklahoma took place on November 8, 1932, as part of the 1932 United States presidential election. Voters chose 11 representatives, or electors, to the Electoral College, who voted for president and vice president.

Oklahoma was won in a landslide by Governor Franklin D. Roosevelt (D–New York), running with Speaker John Nance Garner, with 73.30 percent of the popular vote, against incumbent President Herbert Hoover (R–California), running with Vice President Charles Curtis, with 26.70 percent of the popular vote. As of the 2024 presidential election, this is the only presidential election in which Major County voted for the Democratic candidate as well as the only occasion between 1916 and 1976 that Major County was not the most Republican county in the state. This is also the best Democratic performance in Oklahoma history, the only election in which the Democratic candidate carried every single county in the state, as well as the first time any candidate won all 77 Oklahoma counties, a feat that has since been repeated 7 times by Republicans.

== Results ==
1932 United States presidential election in Oklahoma
Party	Candidate	Votes	%
Democratic	Franklin D. Roosevelt	516,468	73.30%
Republican	Herbert Hoover (inc.)	188,165	26.70%
Total votes		704,633	100%

=== Results by county ===
County	Franklin Delano Roosevelt Democratic		Herbert Clark Hoover Republican		Margin		Total votes cast
County	#	%	#	%	#	%	Total votes cast
Adair	3,812	66.26%	1,941	33.74%	1,871	32.52%	5,753
Alfalfa	3,642	64.13%	2,037	35.87%	1,605	28.26%	5,679
Atoka	3,678	86.75%	562	13.25%	3,116	73.49%	4,240
Beaver	2,553	65.28%	1,358	34.72%	1,195	30.55%	3,911
Beckham	5,979	87.02%	892	12.98%	5,087	74.04%	6,871
Blaine	4,719	73.20%	1,728	26.80%	2,991	46.39%	6,447
Bryan	7,681	90.30%	825	9.70%	6,856	80.60%	8,506
Caddo	11,001	78.73%	2,972	21.27%	8,029	57.46%	13,973
Canadian	6,767	72.64%	2,549	27.36%	4,218	45.28%	9,316
Carter	9,633	84.75%	1,733	15.25%	7,900	69.51%	11,366
Cherokee	4,633	67.07%	2,275	32.93%	2,358	34.13%	6,908
Choctaw	4,908	82.52%	1,040	17.48%	3,868	65.03%	5,948
Cimarron	1,895	76.85%	571	23.15%	1,324	53.69%	2,466
Cleveland	5,969	76.16%	1,868	23.84%	4,101	52.33%	7,837
Coal	2,788	90.28%	300	9.72%	2,488	80.57%	3,088
Comanche	7,586	78.76%	2,046	21.24%	5,540	57.52%	9,632
Cotton	4,426	85.38%	758	14.62%	3,668	70.76%	5,184
Craig	4,861	69.59%	2,124	30.41%	2,737	39.18%	6,985
Creek	12,963	65.64%	6,786	34.36%	6,177	31.28%	19,749
Custer	6,573	79.61%	1,684	20.39%	4,889	59.21%	8,257
Delaware	3,684	71.49%	1,469	28.51%	2,215	42.98%	5,153
Dewey	3,855	78.58%	1,051	21.42%	2,804	57.15%	4,906
Ellis	2,795	71.96%	1,089	28.04%	1,706	43.92%	3,884
Garfield	10,773	61.18%	6,837	38.82%	3,936	22.35%	17,610
Garvin	7,834	88.34%	1,034	11.66%	6,800	76.68%	8,868
Grady	9,247	81.97%	2,034	18.03%	7,213	63.94%	11,281
Grant	4,432	69.97%	1,902	30.03%	2,530	39.94%	6,334
Greer	4,240	91.03%	418	8.97%	3,822	82.05%	4,658
Harmon	3,042	94.15%	189	5.85%	2,853	88.30%	3,231
Harper	2,139	73.20%	783	26.80%	1,356	46.41%	2,922
Haskell	4,357	75.17%	1,439	24.83%	2,918	50.35%	5,796
Hughes	6,485	85.34%	1,114	14.66%	5,371	70.68%	7,599
Jackson	5,759	90.52%	603	9.48%	5,156	81.04%	6,362
Jefferson	3,566	88.03%	485	11.97%	3,081	76.06%	4,051
Johnston	3,277	90.88%	329	9.12%	2,948	81.75%	3,606
Kay	12,841	68.58%	5,884	31.42%	6,957	37.15%	18,725
Kingfisher	3,986	65.46%	2,103	34.54%	1,883	30.92%	6,089
Kiowa	5,204	84.34%	966	15.66%	4,238	68.69%	6,170
Latimer	3,119	81.08%	728	18.92%	2,391	62.15%	3,847
Le Flore	8,680	78.60%	2,363	21.40%	6,317	57.20%	11,043
Lincoln	7,641	68.55%	3,505	31.45%	4,136	37.11%	11,146
Logan	5,773	59.32%	3,959	40.68%	1,814	18.64%	9,732
Love	2,426	92.84%	187	7.16%	2,239	85.69%	2,613
Major	2,525	64.76%	1,374	35.24%	1,151	29.52%	3,899
Marshall	3,236	91.03%	319	8.97%	2,917	82.05%	3,555
Mayes	4,444	73.58%	1,596	26.42%	2,848	47.15%	6,040
McClain	5,087	86.15%	818	13.85%	4,269	72.29%	5,905
McCurtain	5,886	90.93%	587	9.07%	5,299	81.86%	6,473
McIntosh	4,533	80.80%	1,077	19.20%	3,456	61.60%	5,610
Murray	3,086	85.30%	532	14.70%	2,554	70.59%	3,618
Muskogee	12,621	70.23%	5,351	29.77%	7,270	40.45%	17,972
Noble	4,414	72.97%	1,635	27.03%	2,779	45.94%	6,049
Nowata	3,773	66.51%	1,900	33.49%	1,873	33.02%	5,673
Okfuskee	5,126	78.37%	1,415	21.63%	3,711	56.73%	6,541
Oklahoma	41,120	65.94%	21,238	34.06%	19,882	31.88%	62,358
Okmulgee	11,287	70.33%	4,762	29.67%	6,525	40.66%	16,049
Osage	10,833	69.41%	4,775	30.59%	6,058	38.81%	15,608
Ottawa	8,175	71.81%	3,210	28.19%	4,965	43.61%	11,385
Pawnee	5,000	68.68%	2,280	31.32%	2,720	37.36%	7,280
Payne	7,819	66.87%	3,874	33.13%	3,945	33.74%	11,693
Pittsburg	10,536	81.47%	2,396	18.53%	8,140	62.94%	12,932
Pontotoc	7,227	85.69%	1,207	14.31%	6,020	71.38%	8,434
Pottawatomie	12,013	74.73%	4,063	25.27%	7,950	49.45%	16,076
Pushmataha	3,419	87.46%	490	12.54%	2,929	74.93%	3,909
Roger Mills	3,648	87.71%	511	12.29%	3,137	75.43%	4,159
Rogers	5,347	74.00%	1,879	26.00%	3,468	47.99%	7,226
Seminole	12,154	78.40%	3,348	21.60%	8,806	56.81%	15,502
Sequoyah	4,704	71.96%	1,833	28.04%	2,871	43.92%	6,537
Stephens	7,706	88.39%	1,012	11.61%	6,694	76.78%	8,718
Texas	4,033	74.62%	1,372	25.38%	2,661	49.23%	5,405
Tillman	4,960	90.46%	523	9.54%	4,437	80.92%	5,483
Tulsa	35,330	58.04%	25,541	41.96%	9,789	16.08%	60,871
Wagoner	4,015	72.74%	1,505	27.26%	2,510	45.47%	5,520
Washington	6,863	59.29%	4,713	40.71%	2,150	18.57%	11,576
Washita	6,049	87.21%	887	12.79%	5,162	74.42%	6,936
Woods	4,279	68.06%	2,008	31.94%	2,271	36.12%	6,287
Woodward	3,988	71.19%	1,614	28.81%	2,374	42.38%	5,602
Total	516,468	73.30%	188,165	26.70%	328,303	46.59%	704,633

==== Counties that flipped from Republican to Democratic ====
- Caddo
- Carter
- Cimarron
- Texas
- Beaver
- Craig
- Greer
- Harmon
- Kiowa
- Le Flore
- Marshall
- Comanche
- Stephens
- Cotton
- Jefferson
- Mayes
- Murray
- Nowata
- Okfuskee
- Osage
- Pawnee
- Pontotoc
- Pushmataha
- Seminole
- Sequoyah
- Tillman
- Cherokee
- Haskell
- Hughes
- McIntosh
- Muskogee
- Okmulgee
- Ottawa
- Beckham
- Delaware
- Washita
- Adair
- Alfalfa
- Blaine
- Canadian
- Cleveland
- Creek
- Custer
- Dewey
- Ellis
- Garfield
- Grady
- Grant
- Harper
- Jackson
- Kay
- Kingfisher
- Lincoln
- Logan
- McClain
- Major
- Noble
- Oklahoma
- Payne
- Pottawatomie
- Roger Mills
- Rogers
- Tulsa
- Wagoner
- Washington
- Woods
- Woodward

== See also ==
- United States presidential elections in Oklahoma
