= 2008 Oklahoma Republican presidential primary =

- February 5, 2008

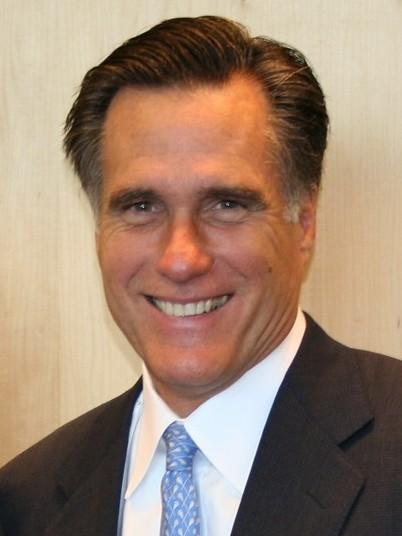
Candidate	John McCain	Mike Huckabee	Mitt Romney
Home state	Arizona	Arkansas	Massachusetts
Delegate count	32	6	0
Popular vote	122,772	111,899	83,030
Percentage	36.64%	33.40%	24.78%
- County results John McCain Mike Huckabee Tie

The 2008 Oklahoma Republican presidential primary was held on February 5, with 41 delegates at stake. It was a closed primary, meaning only registered Republicans could vote in the election. The primary was on Super Tuesday on the same day as twenty-three other states. John McCain won Oklahoma's primary with 37% of the vote, although Mike Huckabee picked up some delegate votes as well by receiving 33% of the vote.

Eleven candidates appeared on the Oklahoma Republican Party primary: John McCain, Tom Tancredo (withdrawn), Duncan Hunter (withdrawn), Ron Paul, Rudy Giuliani (withdrawn), Jerry Curry, Mitt Romney, Alan Keyes, Fred Thompson (withdrawn), Daniel Ayers Gilbert, and Mike Huckabee.

The filing period ended December 5, 2007, after which candidate was allowed to be added to the ballot. No candidate could withdraw his name after the withdrawal deadline of December 7, 2007. Consequently, four candidates' names appeared on the ballot despite their withdrawal from the election.

== Polling ==
Early polling in Oklahoma showed Oklahoma Republicans preferred Rudy Giuliani over John McCain. A February 9–13, 2007 by the American Research Group showed Oklahoma Republicans preferred Rudy Giuliani, 37%, over John McCain, 21%. Three months later, a May 16, 2007 Tulsa World/KOTV poll showed Rudy Giuliani, 32%, retained his lead over John McCain, 23%.

By December 2007, Mike Huckabee had started to make headway in both national polling and in Oklahoma. A December 16–19, 2007 Tulsa World/KOTV poll showed Mike Huckabee 29%, John McCain 17%, and Rudy Giuliani 11%. Huckabee retained his lead leading into mid-January. A January 11–13, 2008 Survey USA poll showed Mike Huckabee 31% and John McCain 29%. Rudy Giuliani had slipped to fourth with 11%.

With the primaries less than two weeks away, John McCain started polling better than Mike Huckabee. A January 27, 2008 poll by Survey USA showed Mike Huckabee with 28% and John McCain 37%. With just two days before the Oklahoma Republican primary, another Survey USA poll showed John McCain retained his lead at 37% and Mike Huckabee at 32%.

== Allocation of delegates ==
Oklahoma sent 41 delegates to the 2008 Republican National Convention:

- 15 district delegates, three for each of Oklahoma's five US congressional districts. Each district delegate is pledged to the presidential candidate who receives the most primary votes in his or her district.
- 10 at-large delegates. At-large delegates are awarded to each state regardless of its size. At-large delegates are pledged to the presidential candidate who receives the most primary votes statewide.
- 13 bonus delegates. Bonus delegates are awarded to states for having US Senator and governors from the Republican party as well as sending a Republican majority to the House. Like at-large delegates, bonus delegates are pledged to the presidential candidate who receives the most primary votes statewide.
- 3 party delegates. The party delegates are the National Committeeman, the National Committeewoman, and the chairman of the Oklahoma Republican Party. The three party delegates are not pledged to any presidential candidate.

In the event of a brokered convention, all of Oklahoma's 41 delegates may vote for any Republican presidential candidate regardless of the state primary results.

== Results ==
Key:	Withdrew prior to contest

2008 Oklahoma Republican presidential primary
Candidate	Votes	Percentage	National delegates
John McCain	122,772	36.64%	32
Mike Huckabee	111,899	33.40%	6
Mitt Romney	83,030	24.78%	0
Ron Paul	11,183	3.34%	0
Rudy Giuliani	2,412	0.72%	0
Fred Thompson	1,924	0.57%	0
Alan Keyes	817	0.24%	0
Thomas L. Kane	387	0.12%	0
Duncan Hunter	317	0.09%	0
Tom Tancredo	189	0.06%	0
Daniel Gilbert	124	0.04%	0
Totals	335,054	100.00%	38

== See also ==
- 2008 Oklahoma Democratic presidential primary
- 2008 Republican Party presidential primaries
