= 2008 Oklahoma Democratic presidential primary =

- February 5, 2008

38 pledged delegates to the 2008 Democratic National Convention

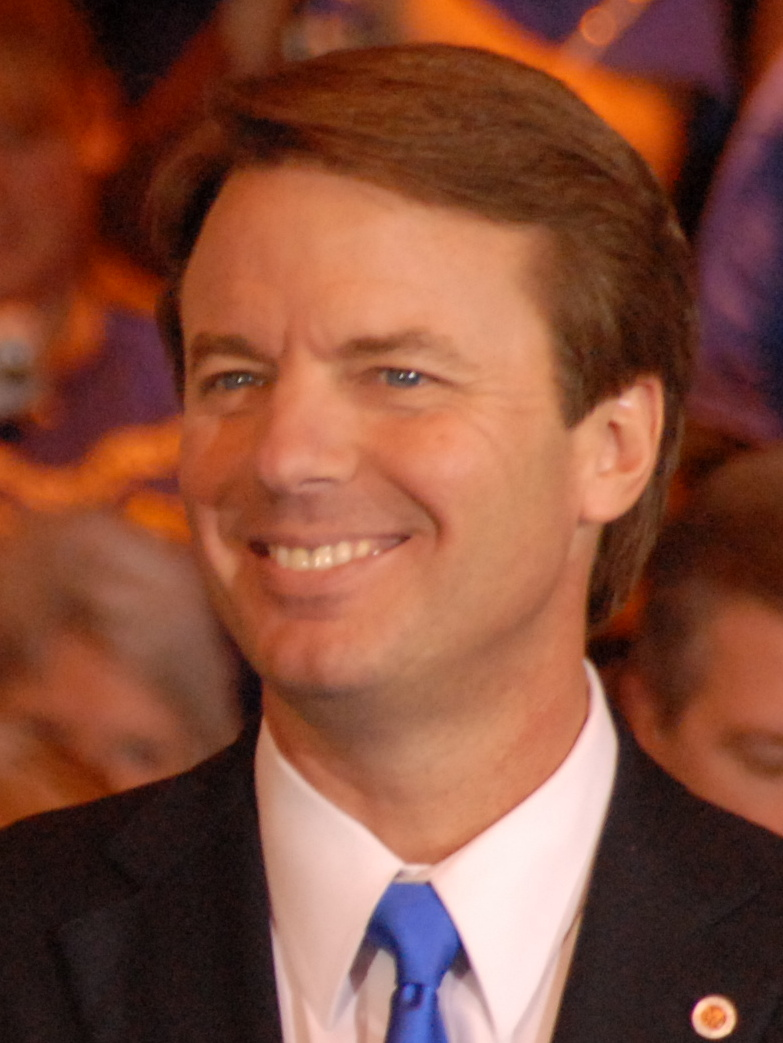
Candidate	Hillary Clinton	Barack Obama	John Edwards (withdrawn)
Home state	New York	Illinois	North Carolina
Delegate count	24	14	0
Popular vote	228,480	130,130	42,725
Percentage	54.76%	31.19%	10.24%
- County results Clinton: 30–40% 40–50% 50–60% 60–70% Obama: 40–50%

The 2008 Oklahoma Democratic presidential primary, part of the process of selecting that party's nominee for President of the United States, took place on February 5, one of the many nominating contests of 2008's "Super Tuesday". The primary election chose 38 pledged delegates to represent Oklahoma at the 2008 Democratic National Convention. The remainder of Oklahoma's 47 delegates consisted of unpledged superdelegates not bound by the results of the primary. The election was a closed primary, meaning that only registered Democrats could vote in this election. Hillary Clinton won the primary by a significant margin.

Clinton, Barack Obama, and Jim Rogers appeared on the ballot, together with four candidates who had already withdrawn from the contest: Chris Dodd, Bill Richardson, Dennis Kucinich, and John Edwards. All but Rogers had run nationwide campaigns for the presidential nomination; Rogers is a perennial candidate in Oklahoma who had run for lieutenant governor in 2006.

== Pre-primary polling, predictions, and events ==
Early polling in Oklahoma consistently showed Clinton and Edwards to be the leaders in the state, and Obama a more distant third. The polling also indicated that other candidates were barely registering. In 2004 Edwards narrowly finished second in Oklahoma behind Wesley Clark by about one thousand votes. Oklahoma had been a key state for John Edwards as he made stops in the state January 15 and 18, over three weeks ahead of the primary date, but Edwards withdrew on January 30, 2008. Former President Bill Clinton stopped at the University of Oklahoma on January 30 to speak at a rally supporting his wife.

=== Money raised from Oklahoma ===
Obtained from The Oklahoman

Candidate	Money raised (US$)
John Edwards	$397,316
Barack Obama	$396,592
Bill Richardson	$83,070
Hillary Clinton	$508,050
Joe Biden	$5,400
Chris Dodd	$850
Dennis Kucinich	$3,767

== Delegates ==
Oklahoma sent 47 delegates to the Democratic National Convention. In order to secure pledged delegates, a candidate had to receive at least 15% of the vote. The delegates were broken down into the following categories:

- 38 pledged delegates, allocated based on the results of the primary:
  - 25 District Level Delegates were allotted proportionally based on the support each candidate received in each congressional district. There were 5 delegates for each congressional district.
  - 8 At-large Delegates were allotted proportionally based on the support each candidate received statewide.
  - 5 party leaders and elected officials ("PLEO Delegates") were allotted proportionally based on the support each candidate received statewide.
- 9 unpledged superdelegates consisting of PLEOs were not bound by the results of the primary.

== Results ==
Key:	Withdrew prior to contest

2008 Oklahoma Democratic presidential primary
Candidate	Votes	Percentage	National delegates
Hillary Clinton	228,480	54.76%	24
Barack Obama	130,130	31.19%	14
John Edwards	42,725	10.24%	0
Bill Richardson	7,078	1.70%	0
Jim Rogers	3,905	0.94%	0
Christopher Dodd	2,511	0.60%	0
Dennis Kucinich	2,378	0.57%	0
Totals	417,207	100.00%	38

== See also ==
- 2008 Democratic Party presidential primaries
- 2008 Oklahoma Republican presidential primary
