= Ochelata, Oklahoma =

Town in Oklahoma, United States

- Town
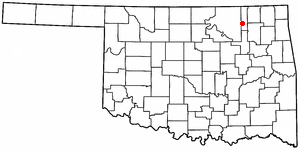
- Location of Ochelata, Oklahoma
- Coordinates: 36°36′11″N 95°58′07″W
- Country: United States
- State: Oklahoma
- County: Washington

Area
  - Total: 0.65 sq mi (1.69 km^{2})
  - Land: 0.65 sq mi (1.69 km^{2})
  - Water: 0 sq mi (0.00 km^{2})
- Elevation: 742 ft (226 m)

Population (2020)
  - Total: 427
  - Density: 653.6/sq mi (252.36/km^{2})
- Time zone: UTC−6 (Central (CST))
  - Summer (DST): UTC−5 (CDT)
- ZIP Code: 74051
- Area codes: 539/918
- FIPS code: 40-53700
- GNIS feature ID: 2413072

Ochelata /oʊʃəˈleɪtə/ is a town in Washington County, Oklahoma, United States. As of the 2020 census, Ochelata had a population of 427.

== History ==
This settlement was founded circa 1898 by Thomas Ellis, who had bought 40 acres from a Cherokee land owner named Jacob Dick. Ellis named the community Otis. It was renamed Ochelata in November 1899 to honor Cherokee Principal Chief Charles Thompson, whose Cherokee name was Oochalata. The Atchison, Topeka and Santa Fe Railway reached Ochelata in 1899. A post office was established March 23, 1900, and the town of Ochelata was incorporated in 1902.

Ochelata School District was consolidated with Ramona, Vera, and Oglesby to become the Caney Valley School District. The elementary school is located in Ochelata and the administration, middle school and high school are located in Ramona. In 2013–2014, the old Ochelata School building was renovated and placed back in service with classrooms.

== Geography ==
According to the United States Census Bureau, the town has a total area of 0.2 square miles (0.52 km^{2}), all land.

== Demographics ==
Historical population
Census	Pop.	Note	%±
1910	550		—
1920	419		−23.8%
1930	335		−20.0%
1940	333		−0.6%
1950	357		7.2%
1960	312		−12.6%
1970	330		5.8%
1980	480		45.5%
1990	441		−8.1%
2000	494		12.0%
2010	424		−14.2%
2020	427		0.7%
U.S. Decennial Census

=== 2020 census ===
As of the 2020 census, Ochelata had a population of 427. The median age was 37.3 years. 27.6% of residents were under the age of 18 and 18.3% of residents were 65 years of age or older. For every 100 females there were 96.8 males, and for every 100 females age 18 and over there were 88.4 males age 18 and over.

0.0% of residents lived in urban areas, while 100.0% lived in rural areas.

There were 164 households in Ochelata, of which 42.1% had children under the age of 18 living in them. Of all households, 45.1% were married-couple households, 18.3% were households with a male householder and no spouse or partner present, and 29.3% were households with a female householder and no spouse or partner present. About 25.0% of all households were made up of individuals and 12.8% had someone living alone who was 65 years of age or older.

There were 178 housing units, of which 7.9% were vacant. The homeowner vacancy rate was 0.0% and the rental vacancy rate was 0.0%.

Racial composition as of the 2020 census
Race	Number	Percent
White	268	62.8%
Black or African American	0	0.0%
American Indian and Alaska Native	64	15.0%
Asian	1	0.2%
Native Hawaiian and Other Pacific Islander	0	0.0%
Some other race	6	1.4%
Two or more races	88	20.6%
Hispanic or Latino (of any race)	18	4.2%

=== 2000 census ===
As of the census of 2000, there were 494 people, 175 households, and 131 families residing in the town. The population density was 2,018.0 inhabitants per square mile (779.2/km^{2}). There were 188 housing units at an average density of 768.0 per square mile (296.5/km^{2}). The racial makeup of the town was 72.27% White, 18.83% Native American, 1.01% from other races, and 7.89% from two or more races. Hispanic or Latino of any race were 1.42% of the population.

There were 175 households, out of which 36.0% had children under the age of 18 living with them, 60.6% were married couples living together, 10.3% had a female householder with no husband present, and 25.1% were non-families. Of all households 23.4% were made up of individuals, and 12.6% had someone living alone who was 65 years of age or older. The average household size was 2.82 and the average family size was 3.34.

In the town, the population was spread out, with 32.0% under the age of 18, 9.5% from 18 to 24, 25.3% from 25 to 44, 21.1% from 45 to 64, and 12.1% who were 65 years of age or older. The median age was 33 years. For every 100 females, there were 100.0 males. For every 100 females age 18 and over, there were 90.9 males.

The median income for a household in the town was $37,500, and the median income for a family was $40,781. Males had a median income of $31,250 versus $21,875 for females. The per capita income for the town was $14,365. Of the population 7.1% and 8.8% of families were below the poverty line. Out of the total population living in poverty, 10.5% of those under the age of 18 and 3.1% of those 65 and older were living below the poverty line.
