= Major County, Oklahoma =

County in Oklahoma, United States

- County
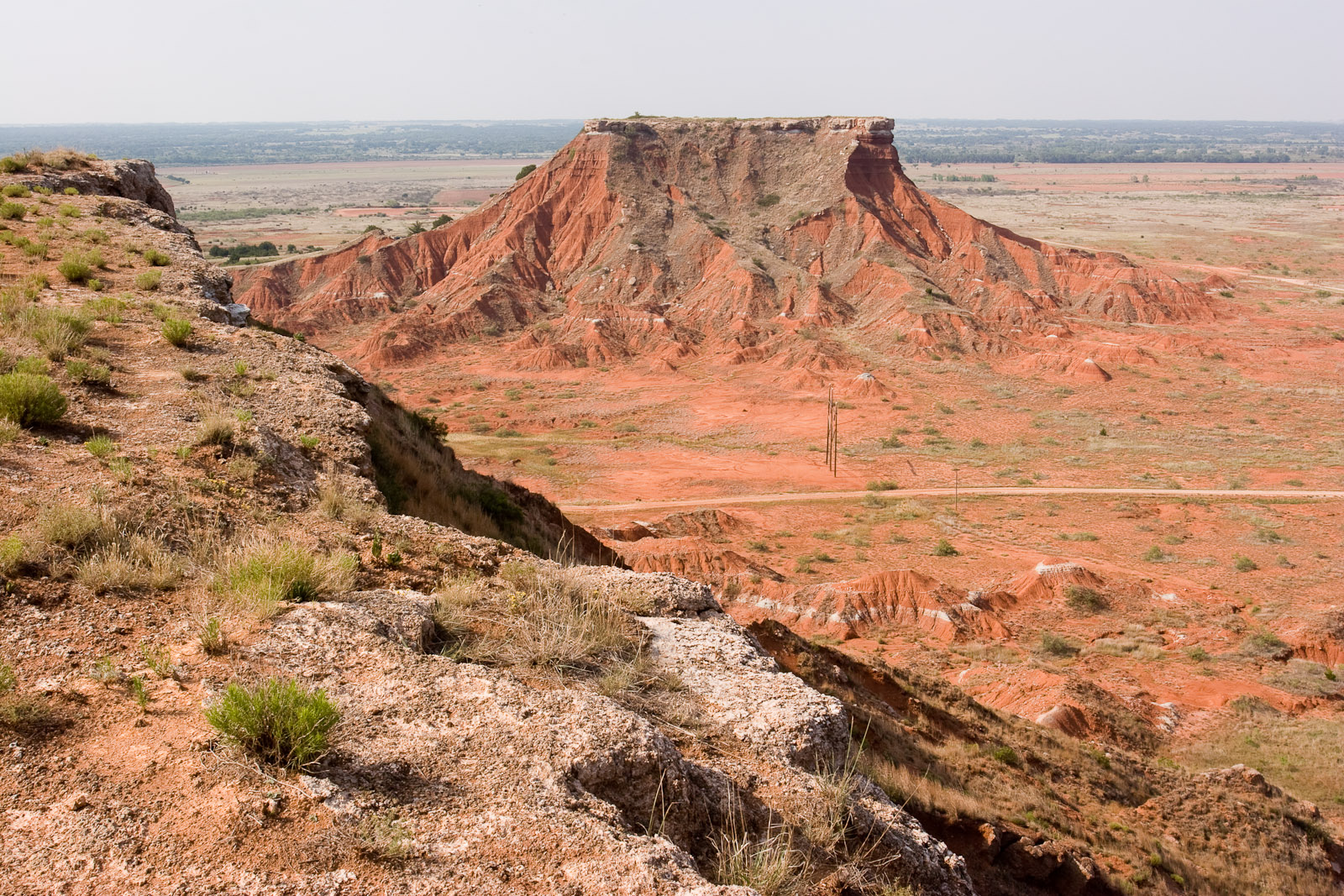
- Glass Mountains

- Location within the U.S. state of Oklahoma
- Coordinates: 36°19′N 98°32′W
- Country: United States
- State: Oklahoma
- Founded: 1907
- Seat: Fairview
- Largest city: Fairview

Area
  - Total: 958 sq mi (2,480 km^{2})
  - Land: 955 sq mi (2,470 km^{2})
  - Water: 3.0 sq mi (7.8 km^{2}) 0.3%

Population (2020)
  - Total: 7,782
  - Estimate (2025): 7,536 ▼
  - Density: 8.15/sq mi (3.15/km^{2})
- Time zone: UTC−6 (Central)
  - Summer (DST): UTC−5 (CDT)
- Congressional district: 3rd
- Website: https://majorcountyok.org/

Major County is a county in the northwestern part of the U.S. state of Oklahoma. As of the 2020 census, its population was 7,782. Its county seat is Fairview. The county was created in 1907.

Located in northwestern Oklahoma, Major County is bounded by Woods and Alfalfa counties in the north, Garfield County on the east, Kingfisher, Blaine, and Dewey on the south, and Woodward on the west. Major County has 957.87 square miles of land and water. It is drained by the North Canadian and Cimarron Rivers, and the Eagle Chief, Griever, and Sand Creeks.

== History ==
Upon statehood in 1907, Major County was created from the southern part of a territorial county. Fairview, which had been settled following the Land Run of 1893, was designated the county seat, and voters reaffirmed the choice on December 22, 1908. The county commissioners rented office space until a brick courthouse was constructed. A second courthouse, made of stone, was erected in 1928.

Named for John Charles Major, a representative of the state's 1906 Constitutional Convention, the area was originally settled by large numbers of Kansas Mennonites. One county town, Meno, received its name from an early leader of the Mennonite movement, Menno Simons.

The county experienced "Black Sunday" dust storms on April 14, 1935.

== Geography ==
According to the U.S. Census Bureau, the county has a total area of 958 square miles (2,480 km^{2}), of which 955 square miles (2,470 km^{2}) are land and 3.0 square miles (7.8 km^{2}) (0.3%) are covered by water.

Eagle Chief Creek, which empties into the Cimarron River near Cleo Springs, was known to the Cheyenne people as Maheonekamax.

A large gypsum formation extends across much of western Oklahoma, and the Ames Structure, which is buried under 3,000 meters of sand and soil, is possibly the result of a meteorite impact.

The town of Ringwood is a well-known producer of watermelons in the region and holds a Watermelon Festival annually.

=== Major highways ===
- U.S. Highway 60
- U.S. Highway 281
- U.S. Highway 412
- State Highway 8
- State Highway 51A
- State Highway 58

=== Adjacent counties ===
- Woods County (northwest)
- Alfalfa County (northeast)
- Garfield County (east)
- Kingfisher County (southeast)
- Blaine County (south)
- Dewey County (southwest)
- Woodward County (west)

== Demographics ==
Historical population
Census	Pop.	Note	%±
1910	15,248		—
1920	12,426		−18.5%
1930	12,206		−1.8%
1940	11,946		−2.1%
1950	10,279		−14.0%
1960	7,808		−24.0%
1970	7,529		−3.6%
1980	8,772		16.5%
1990	8,055		−8.2%
2000	7,545		−6.3%
2010	7,527		−0.2%
2020	7,782		3.4%
2025 (est.)	7,536	▼	−3.2%
U.S. Decennial Census; 1790-1960 1900-1990; 1990-2000 2010

=== 2020 census ===
As of the 2020 census, the county had a population of 7,782. Of the residents, 25.1% were under the age of 18 and 20.6% were 65 years of age or older; the median age was 41.5 years. For every 100 females there were 97.2 males, and for every 100 females age 18 and over there were 95.6 males.

The racial makeup of the county was 85.1% White, 0.2% Black or African American, 2.1% American Indian and Alaska Native, 0.6% Asian, 3.8% from some other race, and 8.2% from two or more races. Hispanic or Latino residents of any race comprised 10.1% of the population.

There were 3,082 households in the county, of which 33.1% had children under the age of 18 living with them and 21.5% had a female householder with no spouse or partner present. About 25.3% of all households were made up of individuals and 12.9% had someone living alone who was 65 years of age or older.

There were 3,713 housing units, of which 17.0% were vacant. Among occupied housing units, 78.5% were owner-occupied and 21.5% were renter-occupied. The homeowner vacancy rate was 2.4% and the rental vacancy rate was 9.9%.

=== 2000 census ===
As of the 2000 Census, 7,545 people, 3,046 households, and 2,208 families resided in the county. The population density was 8 people per square mile (3.1 people/km^{2}). The 3,540 housing units averaged 4 units per square mile (1.5/km^{2}). Nearly all of the county's residents (94.96%) were listed as White and 94.7% spoke English. Most of the remaining residents were listed as Hispanic or Latino (4.02%), who spoke Spanish (4.1%), Native American (0.9%), or mixed (1.44%). A few spoke German as their first language.

Of the 3,046 households in 2000, 31% had children under 18, 63.7% were married couples, 6% were a female householder with no husband present, and 27.5% were not families. A quarter of the households were made up of individuals, and 13.5% had someone living alone who was 65 or older. The average household size was 2.44, and the average family size was 2.92.

The median age was 42 years. The age distribution was 24.7% under 18, 6.7% were 18 to 24, 24.4% were 25 to 44, 24.9% were 45 to 64, and 19.4% were 65 or older. Females slightly outnumber males, with 95.4 males for every 100 females and 91.5 males for every 100 females 18 and over.

The median income for a household was $30,949, and for a family was $36,888. Males had a median income of $28,078 versus $17,658 for females. The per capita income for the county was $17,272. About 9.3% of families and 12% of the population were below the poverty line, including 15.1% of those under 18 and 9.3% of those 65 or over.

== Politics ==
Voter Registration and Party Enrollment as of June 30, 2023
Party	Number of Voters	Percentage
Democratic	423	9.55%
Republican	3,520	79.46%
Others	487	10.99%
Total	4,430	100%

Major County has been won by the Republican presidential nominee in every election except the 1932 Roosevelt landslide, when Herbert Hoover lost every county in the West South Central States, being the only county in Oklahoma to be won by Alf Landon in 1936. In the last five elections, the Republican presidential candidate has defeated the Democratic candidate by at least 60%, and no Democrat since Jimmy Carter in 1976 has obtained even 30% of the county's vote.

It is part of Oklahoma's 3rd congressional district, which has a Cook Partisan Voting Index of R+29 and is represented by Frank Lucas. In the Oklahoma Senate, it is part of the 27th district and is represented by Republican Casey Murdock. In the Oklahoma House of Representatives, it is part of the 58th district and is represented by Republican Carl Newton.

United States presidential election results for Major County, Oklahoma
Year	Republican		Democratic		Third party(ies)	
Year	No.	%	No.	%	No.	%
1908	1,446	51.59%	877	31.29%	480	17.12%
1912	1,210	48.50%	689	27.62%	596	23.89%
1916	946	39.71%	762	31.99%	674	28.30%
1920	1,921	60.01%	784	24.49%	496	15.50%
1924	1,781	58.51%	649	21.32%	614	20.17%
1928	2,891	78.73%	674	18.36%	107	2.91%
1932	1,374	35.24%	2,525	64.76%	0	0.00%
1936	2,230	53.04%	1,929	45.88%	45	1.07%
1940	3,453	70.60%	1,404	28.71%	34	0.70%
1944	3,019	75.38%	965	24.09%	21	0.52%
1948	2,467	66.78%	1,227	33.22%	0	0.00%
1952	3,495	80.53%	845	19.47%	0	0.00%
1956	2,826	74.82%	951	25.18%	0	0.00%
1960	2,892	80.16%	716	19.84%	0	0.00%
1964	2,436	65.36%	1,291	34.64%	0	0.00%
1968	2,550	72.84%	594	16.97%	357	10.20%
1972	3,203	83.89%	512	13.41%	103	2.70%
1976	2,282	61.73%	1,357	36.71%	58	1.57%
1980	3,059	81.81%	584	15.62%	96	2.57%
1984	3,385	83.89%	619	15.34%	31	0.77%
1988	2,638	71.86%	982	26.75%	51	1.39%
1992	2,154	57.36%	731	19.47%	870	23.17%
1996	2,188	62.30%	900	25.63%	424	12.07%
2000	2,672	79.71%	635	18.94%	45	1.34%
2004	3,122	85.32%	537	14.68%	0	0.00%
2008	2,956	85.16%	515	14.84%	0	0.00%
2012	2,700	85.82%	446	14.18%	0	0.00%
2016	2,948	86.53%	310	9.10%	149	4.37%
2020	3,084	88.95%	320	9.23%	63	1.82%
2024	3,087	88.76%	327	9.40%	64	1.84%

== Economy ==
The county's economy has historically been based on agriculture, specifically wheat farming, poultry raising, and cattle ranching. Major crops have included corn, wheat, kaffir corn, broomcorn, and alfalfa. The Hallren Poultry and Creamery founded in Fairview in 1936 was the county's largest employer by the late 1950s.

Oil and gas production have significantly bolstered the county economy, especially around the Ames Structure and the Ringwood oil field.

== Communities ==
=== City ===
- Fairview (county seat)

=== Towns ===
- Ames
- Cleo Springs
- Meno
- Ringwood

=== Census-designated places ===
- Chester
- Isabella

=== Other unincorporated places ===
- Bado
- Cedar Springs
- Dane
- Orienta
- Orion

== NRHP sites ==
These sites in Major County are listed on the National Register of Historic Places:

- Major County Courthouse, Fairview
- First United Methodist Church, Fairview
