= 13th AACTA International Awards =

2024 film and TV awards

- Date: 10 February 2024
- Site: Home of the Arts, Gold Coast, Queensland
- Hosted by: Rebel Wilson

Highlights
- Best Film: Barbie
- Most awards: Barbie (3)
- Most nominations: Oppenheimer (6)

The 13th Australian Academy of Cinema and Television Arts International Awards, commonly known as the AACTA International Awards, is presented by the Australian Academy of Cinema and Television Arts (AACTA), a non-profit organisation whose aim is to identify, award, promote and celebrate Australia's greatest achievements in film and television. Awards were handed out for the best films of 2023, regardless of the country of origin, and are the international counterpart to the awards for Australian films.

Nominations were announced on 14 December 2023, with Oppenheimer leading with six. Winners were announced on 10 February 2024.

Rebel Wilson served as the ceremony's host.

== Winners and nominees ==
=== Film ===
Best Film: Barbie; American Fiction; Killers of the Flower Moon; Oppenheimer; Poor Things	Best Direction: Christopher Nolan – Oppenheimer; Bradley Cooper – Maestro; Greta Gerwig – Barbie; Yorgos Lanthimos – Poor Things; Martin Scorsese – Killers of the Flower Moon
Best Actor: Cillian Murphy – Oppenheimer as J. Robert Oppenheimer; Bradley Cooper – Maestro as Leonard Bernstein; Leonardo DiCaprio – Killers of the Flower Moon as Ernest Burkhart; Andrew Scott – All of Us Strangers as Adam; Jeffrey Wright – American Fiction as Thelonious "Monk" Ellison	Best Actress: Margot Robbie – Barbie as Barbie; Cate Blanchett – The New Boy as Sister Eileen; Lily Gladstone – Killers of the Flower Moon as Mollie Burkhart; Carey Mulligan – Maestro as Felicia Montealegre; Emma Stone – Poor Things as Bella Baxter
Best Supporting Actor: Ryan Gosling – Barbie as Ken; Matt Damon – Oppenheimer as Leslie Groves; Robert De Niro – Killers of the Flower Moon as William King Hale; Robert Downey Jr. – Oppenheimer as Lewis Strauss; Jacob Elordi – Saltburn as Felix Catton	Best Supporting Actress: Vanessa Kirby – Napoleon as Josephine Bonaparte; Penélope Cruz – Ferrari as Laura Ferrari; Julianne Moore – May December as Gracie; Rosamund Pike – Saltburn as Lady Elspeth Catton; Da'Vine Joy Randolph – The Holdovers as Mary Lamb
Best Screenplay: Tony McNamara – Poor Things; Cord Jefferson – American Fiction; Greta Gerwig and Noah Baumbach – Barbie; Bradley Cooper and Josh Singer – Maestro; Christopher Nolan – Oppenheimer

=== Television ===
Best Comedy Series: The Bear; Only Murders in the Building; Sex Education; Ted Lasso; The Marvelous Mrs. Maisel	Best Drama Series: Succession; Beef; The Crown; The Last of Us; Yellowjackets
Best Actor in a Series: Jeremy Allen White – The Bear as Carmen "Carmy" Berzatto; Kieran Culkin – Succession as Roman Roy; Matthew Macfadyen – Succession as Tom Wambsgans; Pedro Pascal – The Last of Us as Joel Miller; Jeremy Strong – Succession as Kendall Roy	Best Actress in a Series: Sarah Snook – Succession as Siobhan "Shiv"; Elizabeth Debicki – The Crown as Diana, Princess of Wales; Helen Mirren – 1923 as Cara Dutton; Bella Ramsey – The Last of Us as Ellie; Ali Wong – Beef as Amy Lau
