= Dallas–Fort Worth Film Critics Association Awards 2023 =

Annual US film critics awards

29th Dallas–Fort Worth Film Critics Association Awards
- Date: December 18, 2023
- Location: Dallas, Texas
- Country: United States
- Presented by: Dallas–Fort Worth Film Critics Association
- Website: dfwcritics.com

The 29th Dallas–Fort Worth Film Critics Association Awards, honoring the best in film for 2023, were announced on December 18, 2023. These awards "recognizing extraordinary accomplishment in film" are presented annually by the Dallas–Fort Worth Film Critics Association (DFWFCA), based in the Dallas–Fort Worth metroplex region of Texas. The association, founded in and presenting awards since 1990, includes 30 film critics for print, radio, television, and internet publications based in North Texas. It is also committed to ensuring that their membership represents a broad range of voices, ideas and perspectives from across cultural, gender and ideological spectra.

Oppenheimer was the DFWFCA's most awarded film of 2023, taking four honors: Best Director (Christopher Nolan), Best Actor (Cillian Murphy), Best Supporting Actor (Robert Downey Jr.), and Best Cinematography.

== Winners and nominees ==
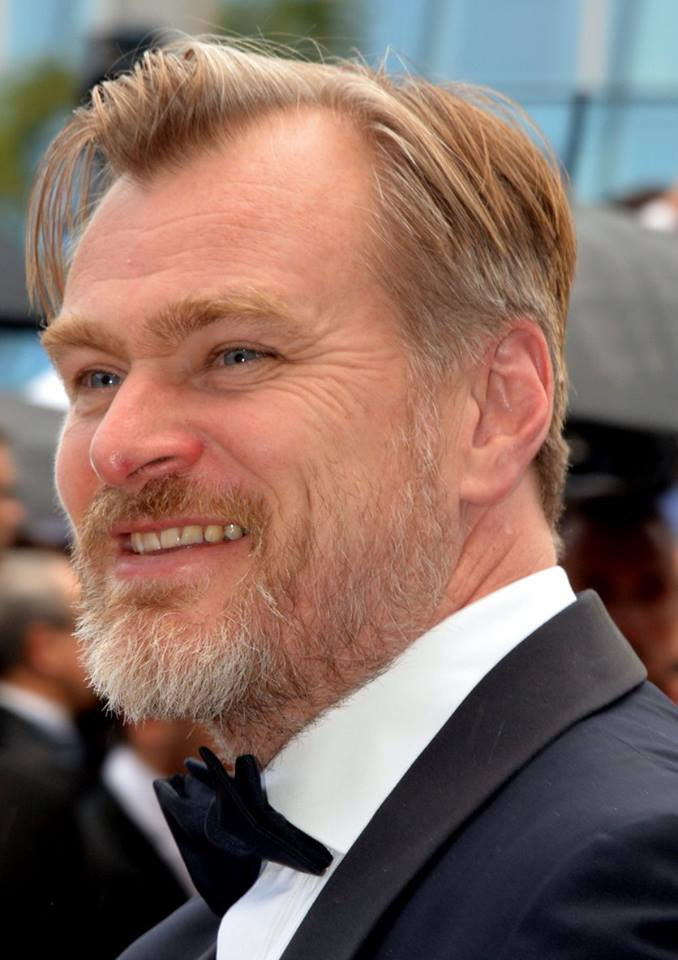
Christopher Nolan, Best Director winner

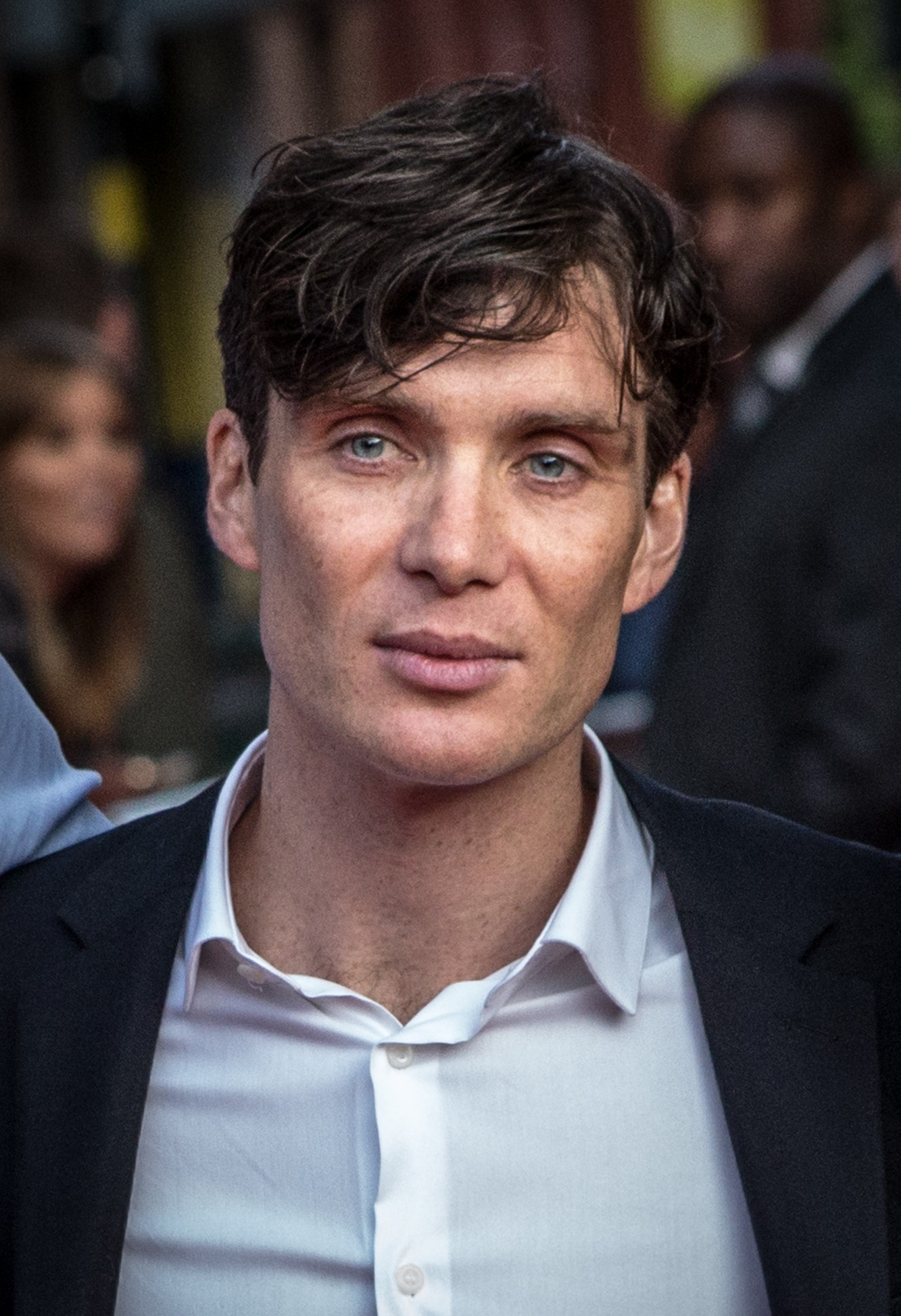
Cillian Murphy, Best Actor winner

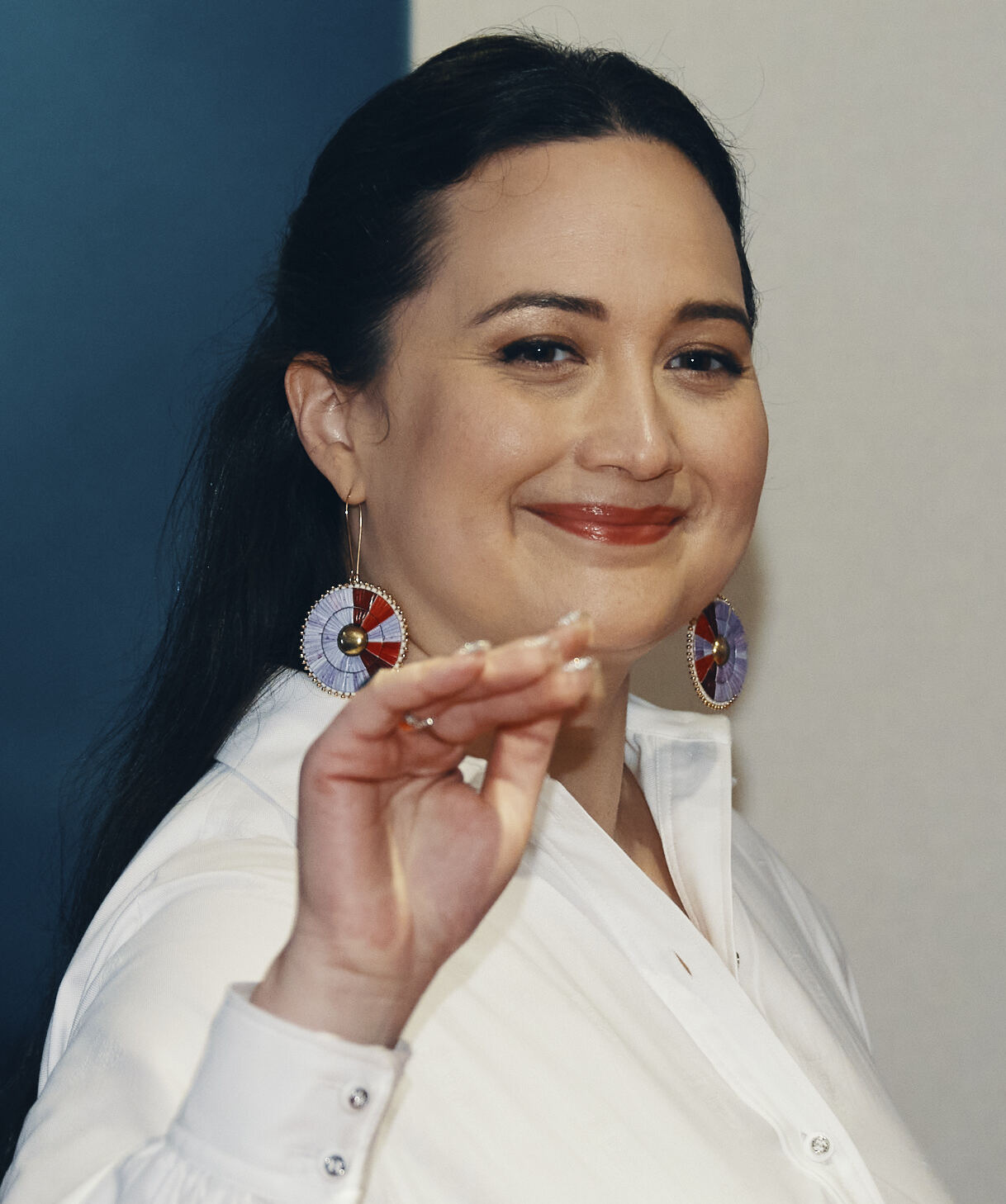
Lily Gladstone, Best Actress winner

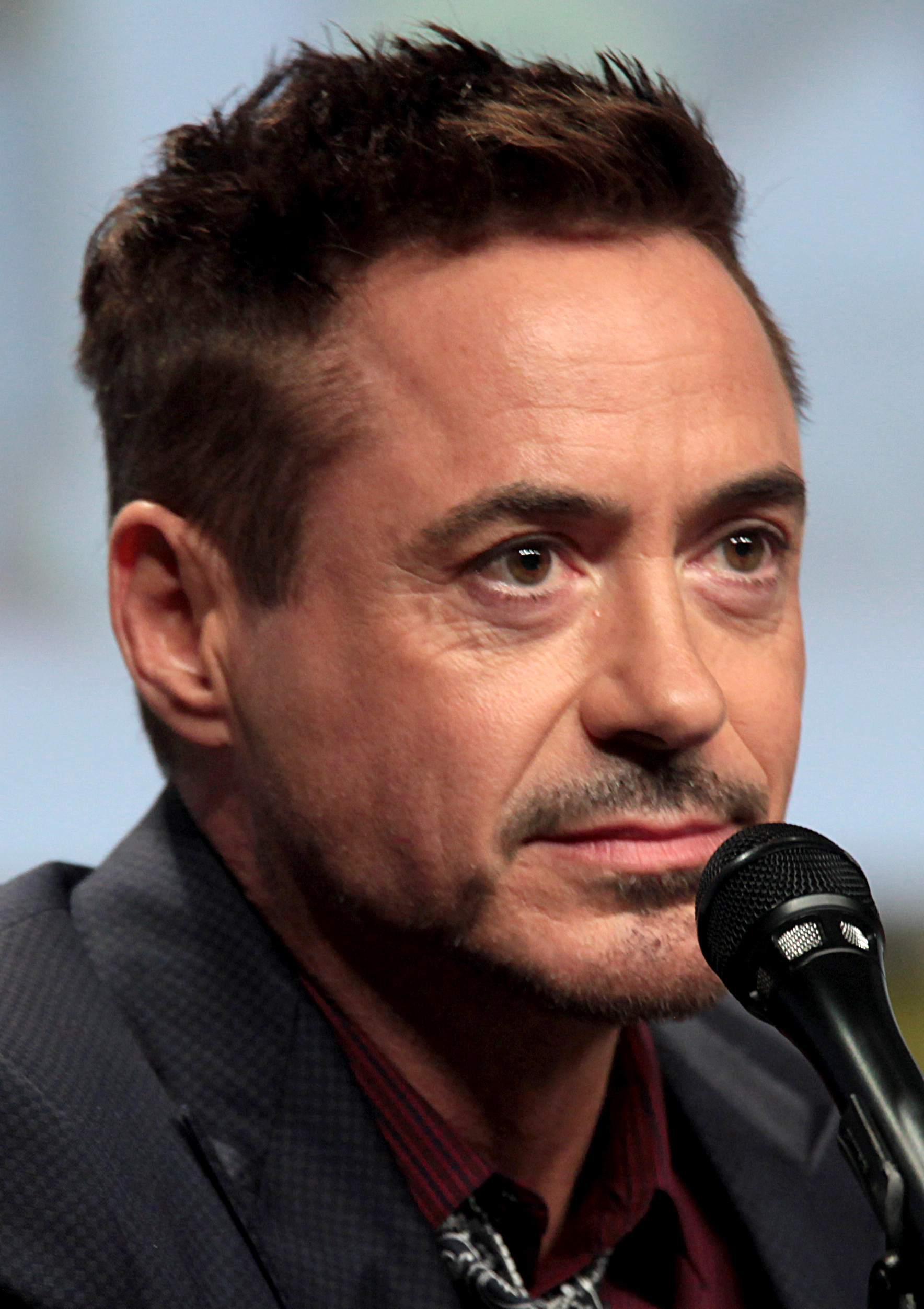
Robert Downey Jr., Best Supporting Actor winner

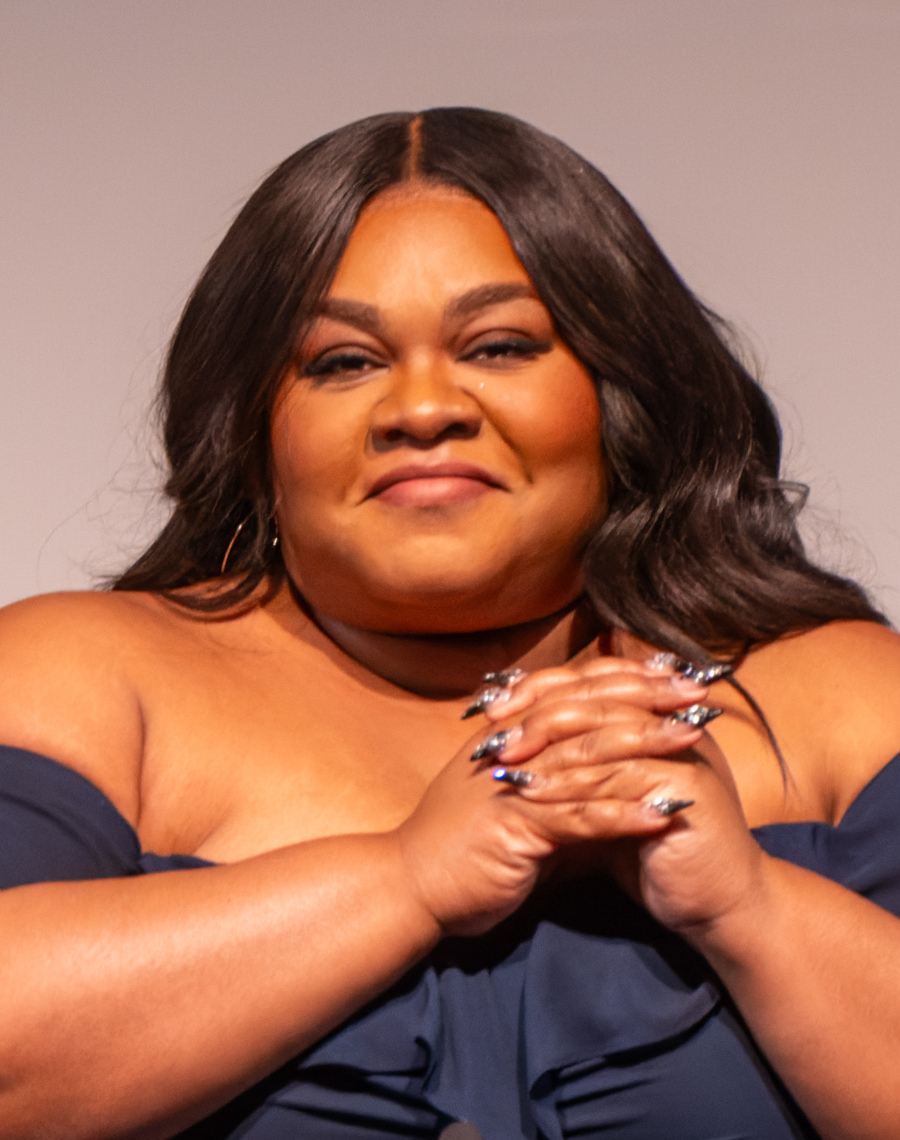
Da'Vine Joy Randolph, Best Supporting Actress winner

=== Category awards ===
Winners are listed first and highlighted with boldface. Other films ranked by the annual poll are listed in order. While most categories saw 5 honorees named, categories ranged from as many as 10 (Best Film) to as few as 2 (Best Animated Film, Best Screenplay, Best Cinematography, and Best Musical Score).

| Best Picture | Best Director |
|---|---|
| 1. **The Holdovers**; 2. Oppenheimer; 3. Killers of the Flower Moon; 4. Poor Things; 5. American Fiction; 6. Past Lives; 7. Maestro; 8. Anatomy of a Fall; 9. Barbie; 10. May December | 1. **Christopher Nolan – Oppenheimer**; 2. Martin Scorsese – Killers of the Flower Moon; 3. Alexander Payne – The Holdovers; 4. Yorgos Lanthimos – Poor Things; 5. Celine Song – Past Lives |
| Best Actor | Best Actress |
| 1. **Cillian Murphy – Oppenheimer as J. Robert Oppenheimer**; 2. Paul Giamatti – The Holdovers as Paul Dunham; 3. Bradley Cooper – Maestro as Leonard Bernstein; 4. Jeffrey Wright – American Fiction as Thelonious "Monk" Ellison; 5. Leonardo DiCaprio – Killers of the Flower Moon as Ernest Burkhart **(TIE)**; 5. Colman Domingo – Rustin as Bayard Rustin **(TIE)** | 1. **Lily Gladstone – Killers of the Flower Moon as Mollie Burkhart**; 2. Emma Stone – Poor Things as Bella Baxter; 3. Carey Mulligan – Maestro as Felicia Montealegre; 4. Greta Lee – Past Lives as Nora Moon; 5. Sandra Hüller – Anatomy of a Fall as Sandra Voyter |
| Best Supporting Actor | Best Supporting Actress |
| 1. **Robert Downey Jr. – Oppenheimer as Lewis Strauss**; 2. Charles Melton – May December as Joe Yoo; 3. Robert De Niro – Killers of the Flower Moon as William King Hale; 4. Mark Ruffalo – Poor Things as Duncan Wedderburn; 5. Dominic Sessa – The Holdovers as Angus Tully | 1. **Da'Vine Joy Randolph – The Holdovers as Mary Lamb**; 2. Danielle Brooks – The Color Purple as Sofia; 3. Emily Blunt – Oppenheimer as Kitty Oppenheimer; 4. Jodie Foster – Nyad as Bonnie Stoll; 5. Julianne Moore – May December as Gracie |
| Best Documentary Film | Best Foreign Language Film |
| 1. **American Symphony**; 2. 20 Days in Mariupol; 3. Still: A Michael J. Fox Movie; 4. The Deepest Breath; 5. The Pigeon Tunnel | 1. **Anatomy of a Fall**; 2. The Zone of Interest; 3. The Taste of Things; 4. Society of the Snow; 5. Fallen Leaves |
| Best Animated Film | Best Screenplay |
| 1. **The Boy and the Heron**; 2. Spider-Man: Across the Spider-Verse | 1. **David Hemingson – The Holdovers**; 2. Justine Triet and Arthur Harari – Anatomy of a Fall |
| Best Cinematography | Best Musical Score |
| 1. **Hoyte van Hoytema – Oppenheimer**; 2. Rodrigo Prieto – Killers of the Flower Moon | 1. **Robbie Robertson – Killers of the Flower Moon** (posthumous); 2. Ludwig Göransson – Oppenheimer |

=== Special award ===
==== Russell Smith Award ====
- **The Zone of Interest** for "best low-budget or cutting-edge independent film"
