= United States v. Ramsey (1926) =

- Supreme Court of the United States

Argued April 22, 1926 Decided June 1, 1926
- Full case name: United States v. John Ramsey et al.
- Citations: 271 U.S. 467 (more) 46 S. Ct. 559; 70 L. Ed. 1039

Case history
- Prior: United States v. Ramsey (W.D. Okla.) (unreported)

Holding
- Held that the United States had the authority to prosecute crimes against Native Americans (Indians) on land that was on a reservation and which was still designated Indian Country by federal law.

Court membership
- Chief Justice William H. Taft Associate Justices Oliver W. Holmes Jr. · Willis Van Devanter; James C. McReynolds · Louis Brandeis; George Sutherland · Pierce Butler; Edward T. Sanford · Harlan F. Stone

Case opinion
- Majority: Sutherland, joined by unanimous

Laws applied
- R.S.§ 2145

United States v. Ramsey, 271 U.S. 467 (1926), was a U.S. Supreme Court case in which the Court held that the government had the authority to prosecute crimes against Native Americans (Indians) on reservation land that was still designated Indian Country by federal law. The Osage Indian Tribe held mineral rights that were worth millions of dollars. A white rancher, William K. Hale, devised a plot to kill tribal members to allow his nephew, who was married to a tribal member, to inherit the mineral rights. The tribe requested the assistance of the federal government, which sent Bureau of Investigation agents to solve the murders. Hale and several others were arrested and tried for the murders, but they claimed that the federal government did not have jurisdiction. The district court quashed the indictments, but on appeal, the Supreme Court reversed, holding that the Osage lands were Indian Country and that the federal government therefore had jurisdiction. This put an end to the Osage Indian murders.

== Background ==
=== Federal law ===
In 1834, Congress passed the Indian Trade and Intercourse Act to regulate trade with the Indians and to provide the United States with criminal jurisdiction for crimes committed by or against Indians. This law provided for trial in a federal court for crimes committed by an Indian against a non-Indian or vice versa. (Note: It did not provide for Indian on Indian crimes until after 1885. For more information on that subject, see Ex parte Crow Dog and Major Crimes Act.) At the time of passage, federal jurisdiction over the Indian Territory was given to the U.S. court in Arkansas and, in 1851, this was clarified as the United States District Court for the Western District of Arkansas. (Note: At the time, this jurisdiction primarily affected non-Indians. Indian on Indian crime was handled by the tribes until Ex parte Crow Dog led to the enactment of a law giving federal courts jurisdiction over those crimes.) In 1890, this law was amended to create the Oklahoma Territory and to give the federal courts in western Arkansas, southern Kansas, and eastern Texas jurisdiction over the Indian Territory. (Note: The location of the murder for this case was in the Oklahoma Territory section, in what is now Osage County.)

=== Territory, statehood and allotment ===
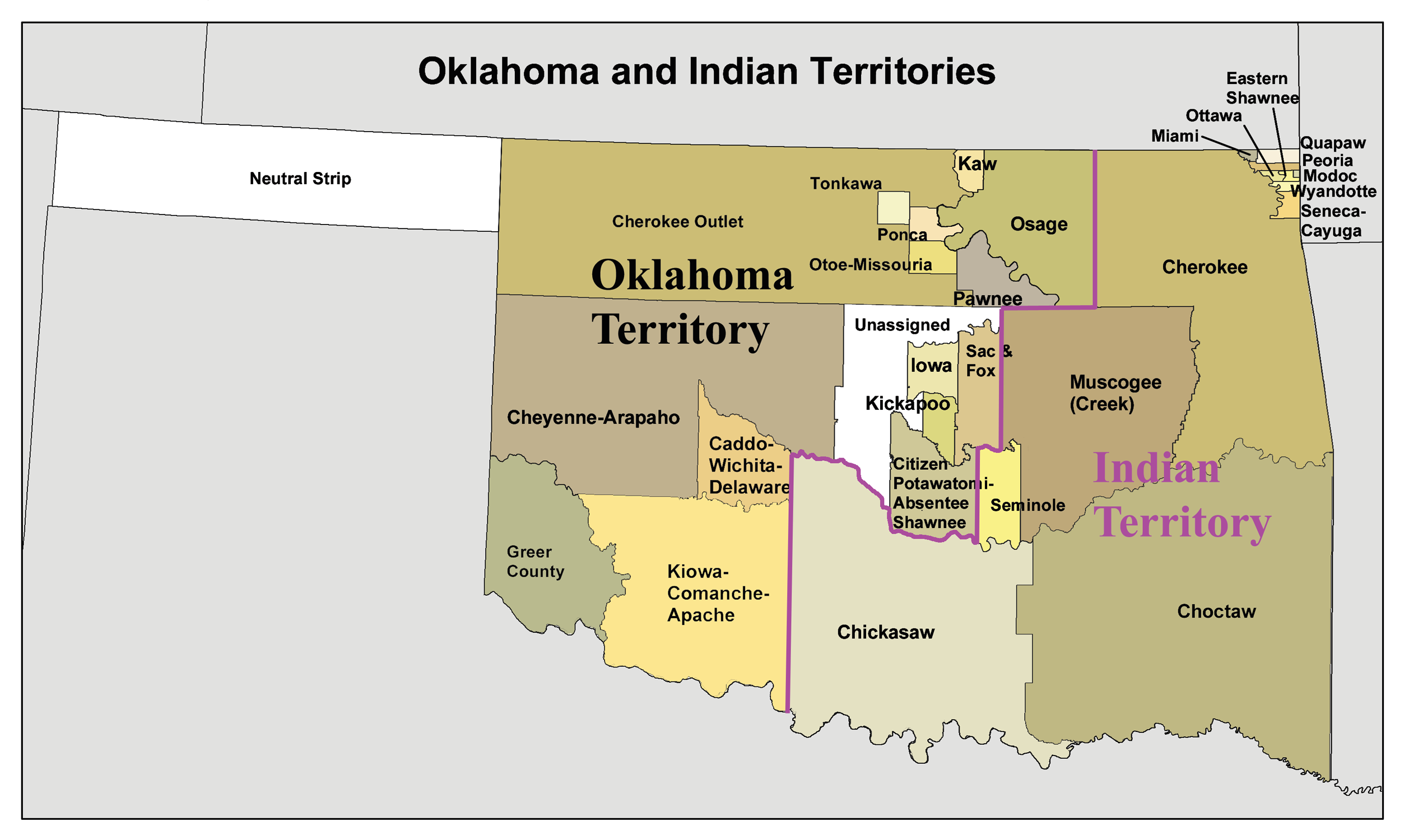
Oklahoma and Indian Territory map, circa 1890s, created using Census Bureau Data

In 1870, the federal government purchased the Kansas reservation from the Osage Nation. The tribe then purchased 1,470,559 acres (595,114 ha) of land in the Indian Territory from the Cherokee Nation. The land was not suited for farming, but had abundant game. In 1890 when Congress passed the Oklahoma Organic Act forming both the Oklahoma and Indian territories, the Osage Indian Reservation was part of the Oklahoma Territory. (Note: The Indian territory consisted of the land of the Five Civilized Tribes and several small tribes in the northeastern corner, while the Oklahoma Territory consisted of all other land in present day Oklahoma.) In 1887, Congress passed the Dawes Act, which served to break up reservations and allot the land to tribal members. The act did not apply to the Five Civilized Tribes or other tribes in the Indian territory nor to the Osage tribe in the Oklahoma territory. In 1898 the Curtis Act applied allotment to the Five Civilized Tribes.

The Osage tribe, seeing the disastrous effects of allotment, resisted it until 1906 when they negotiated an allotment different in two major respects. First, land remaining after each enrolled tribal member received 160 acres (65 ha), so-called 'surplus land', was further divided among tribal members, not placed in the public domain for sale to the general public, and second, mineral rights were retained by the tribe, (Note: The tribe retained mineral rights for 20 years, until 1926, when they passed to whoever owned the land.) and not in a trust status through the federal government. The murder of Henry Roan took place on such an 'surplus allotment'.

=== Reign of terror ===
This ownership of the land and mineral rights had another consequence. In 1896, Edwin B. Foster signed an oil lease for the entire Osage reservation. By 1902 he was shipping 37,000 barrels of oil and by 1906 his companies were producing over 5 million barrels annually. The Osage tribe was one of the wealthiest in the United States, but with the mineral rights transferring to the land owners in 1926, their murder rates also became the highest in the United States. By 1925, Osage families were earning about $65,000 per year, compared to white families that were averaging $1,000. Congress also passed a law providing that an Osage Indian who was less than half blood, as determined by the Secretary of the Interior, did not have to wait to sell his or her land.

In the early 1920s, Osage Indians who owned Osage headrights, or land where they would obtain mineral rights, began to be murdered—the first two were Charles Whitehorn (Note: Whitehorn was found on a hill near his hometown of Pawhuska with two bullet holes between the eyes. Whitehorn was related to the Kyle family by blood.) and Anna Brown, (Note: Brown was found at a remote ravine, shot in the back of the head.) both Osage Indians but killed separately. In February 1923, Henry Roan, another Osage, was found in his car, shot once in the back of the head with a .45 caliber pistol. Less than a month later, an explosion in an Osage home killed Reta Smith, an Osage, her white husband W.E. Smith, and their white maid. Reta Smith was Brown's sister and the daughter of Lizzie Q. Kyle (also known as Lizzie Que), who had died and was thought to have been poisoned. Roan was Reta Smith's cousin. Que had three headrights and both daughters had a full headright and a fractional headright, worth a considerable amount of money. These would be inherited by a third daughter, Molly Burkhart, (Note: Molly was being slowly poisoned by Ernest Burkhart.) who was married to a white man, Ernest Burkhart. Ernest Burkhart was the nephew of a wealthy Texas rancher, William K. Hale, (Note: Hale referred to himself as "King of the Osages.") who had moved to the Osage area.

=== Federal investigation ===
Following these deaths and several others, (Note: Joe Grayhorse was killed in 1921 shortly after making a land deal with Hale. Anna Stafford died mysteriously in 1922; her white widower married Hale's niece shortly after the death. George Bigheart died after Hale and Ernest Burkhart took him to the hospital, where he talked to his attorney. The attorney was found dead the next day on the railroad right of way.) the Osage Tribal Council requested federal assistance since local authorities were apparently making no effort to solve the crimes. The U.S. Bureau of Investigation (BOI), which later became the Federal Bureau of Investigation (FBI), was assigned to conduct the investigation. The BOI responded by sending in undercover agents disguised as cattle buyers and cowhands and, through their investigation, determined that the murders had been planned and executed at the direction of Hale. Hale was implicated in the murder of Brown when Kelsie Morrison confessed in court. (Note: Morrison agreed to kill Brown to cancel a $600 debt he owed Hale; he also received a car and $1,060.) The BOI also discovered that Hale held a $25,000 insurance policy on Roan and noted that his nephew's wife had inherited all of the Kyle headrights. (Note: The total amount would have been approximately $2 million.) Hale and John Ramsey were charged in federal court with the murder of Roan; Ernest Burkhart was charged in state court with arranging the Smith bombing.

=== The trials ===
Ernest Burkhart was tried first. Two weeks into the trial, realizing that he could not win, he changed his plea to guilty and became a witness for the state in exchange for a life sentence. Burkhart testified that Hale was behind the scheme, that Asa "Ace" Kirby was the bomber, and that Henry Grammer was the go-between. (Note: 'Coincidentally', both Kirby and Grammer had been killed before the trial.)

Hale and Ramsey were transferred to Guthrie, Oklahoma in 1926, where they stood trial in state court for the murder of Roan. The trial resulted in a hung jury and a mistrial. The United States Attorney then transferred the case to Oklahoma City and indicted Hale and Ramsey for murder on federal land for the death of Roan. On being indicted, both demurrered on the grounds that the federal government did not have jurisdiction. The U.S. District Court sustained the defendants' motion and the government made a direct appeal to the U.S. Supreme Court.

== Opinion of the court ==
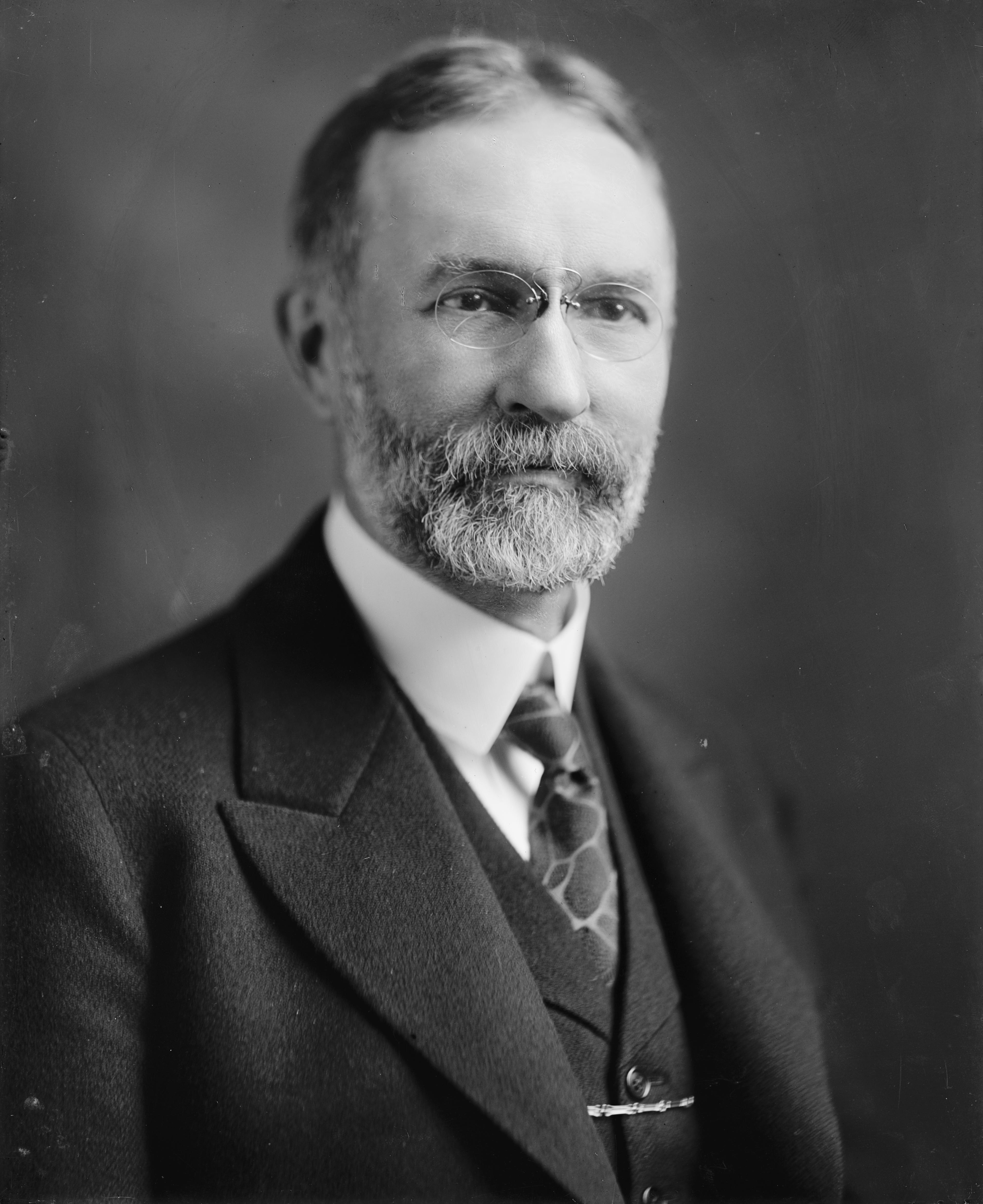
Justice Sutherland, author of the majority opinion

Justice George Sutherland delivered the opinion of the court. He noted that the indictment was drawn under Revised Statute § 2145, which provides for federal jurisdiction of crimes committed in "Indian Country". This section was no longer applicable to general crimes in Oklahoma after statehood. Crimes committed by or against Indians could still be prosecuted under § 2145 if the crime occurred in Indian Country. The question before the court was whether allotted land, with a restriction on sale by the Indian it was allotted to, was still Indian Country. Since the government controlled whether the land could be sold or otherwise alienated, it was no different from land held in trust and was therefore still Indian Country. The judgment of the district court was in error and was reversed.

== Subsequent developments ==
=== Trial in U.S. District Court ===
Following the decision of the Supreme Court, Hale, Burkhart, and Ramsey were tried in federal court. Ernest Burkhart testified that Hale hired Ramsey to kill Roan. (Note: The fee was a new Ford car and $500.) Burkhart also testified to Hale's involvement in the Smith bombing, while Hale testified that he was in Fort Worth, Texas at the time of the killings. All three defendants were convicted and sentenced to life in prison; within days, both Hale and Ramsey appealed.

=== Appeal ===
Hale's appeal was heard first in 1928. It was based on improper procedure in admitting Ernest Burkhart's testimony as to the Smith bombing and again on the contention that the federal government did not have jurisdiction to try the case. The Eighth Circuit Court (Note: Oklahoma was part of the Eighth Circuit from statehood in 1907 until the Tenth Circuit was formed in 1929.) denied the plea to the jurisdiction, noting that the Supreme Court had ruled on that very issue earlier in the case. The court did find that the testimony as to the Smith bombing was not relevant to the Roan murder, was prejudicial against Hale, and required that the case be remanded for retrial. Ramsey's appeal was likewise successful on the same grounds in 1929.

=== Retrial ===
In 1929, both Hale and Ramsey were retried for the murder. Ramsey testified in court and explained how Hale hired him to kill Roan, but later changed his story to claim another person killed Roan. Hale again testified that he had nothing to do with the crime. Both were convicted and again sentenced to life in prison.

=== Aftermath ===
Hale entered the Fort Leavenworth Federal Prison on May 30, 1929, and, over the protests of the Osage tribe, was paroled on July 31, 1947. Ramsey was paroled four months later. Ernest Burkhart was released in October 1959. Morrison was sentenced to life in prison in 1926 for Brown's murder. In January 1931, his conviction was overturned since he'd been promised immunity in exchange for testifying for the prosecution. Morrison was killed in a shootout with police on May 25, 1937. In 1966, Governor Henry Bellmon granted Burkhart a full pardon.
