= Blackie Thompson =

American outlaw and murderer (1893–1934)

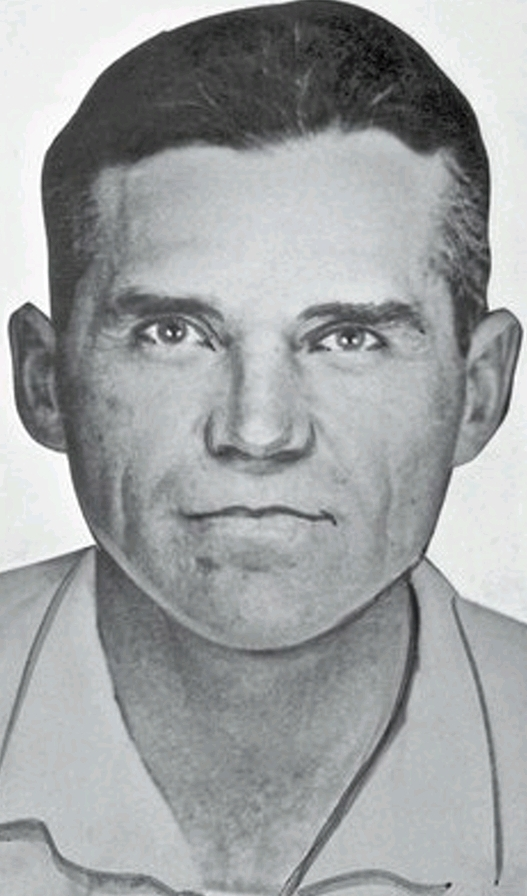
- Thompson in the early 1920s
- Born: Irvin Thompson; 1893; Arkansas or Oklahoma, U.S.
- Died: December 6, 1934 (age 40-41); Route 66, Amarillo, Texas, U.S.
- Cause of death: Gunshot wounds
- Occupations: Outlaw; robber; murder

Blackie Thompson (born Irvin Thompson; 1893 – December 6, 1934) was an American outlaw and murderer active primarily in Oklahoma and Texas.

Tommy Schultz portrayed Thompson in the 2023 film Killers of the Flower Moon.

== Early life and Osage Indian murders ==
"Blackie" Thompson was born Irvin Thompson in either Arkansas or Oklahoma in 1893. In 1920, he was sentenced to five years for automobile theft, but was paroled in 1922. He was arrested again on December 22, 1923, for a bank robbery in Grady County. However, in 1924, he was released to serve as an informant in the Osage Indian murders. While Blackie did provide testimony against William King Hale and Ernest Burkhart, he quickly ran off and formed the "Thompson gang."

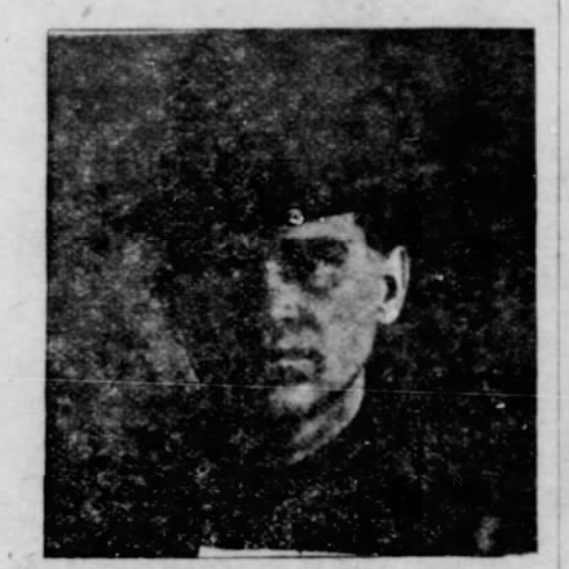
Thompson's 1924 wanted poster

== Thompson gang, later life, and death ==
Thompson went on to kill police officer Ulysses Sterling Lenox in Drumright, Oklahoma on July 2, 1924, after robbing the First State Bank of Avery (2 other officers were injured). On December 19, 1924, his gang robbed the Security State Bank by loading the bank's entire safe into a truck. He was captured on December 25, 1924. Thompson was found guilty of murder and sentenced to life in prison. On August 30, 1933, he escaped from the Oklahoma State Penitentiary. He was recaptured in 1934 after robbing several banks in Texas, and sentenced to death on charges of robbery. However, he escaped from Huntsville Prison on July 22, 1934. Blackie was killed in a stolen car on Route 66 in Amarillo, Texas on December 6, 1934.

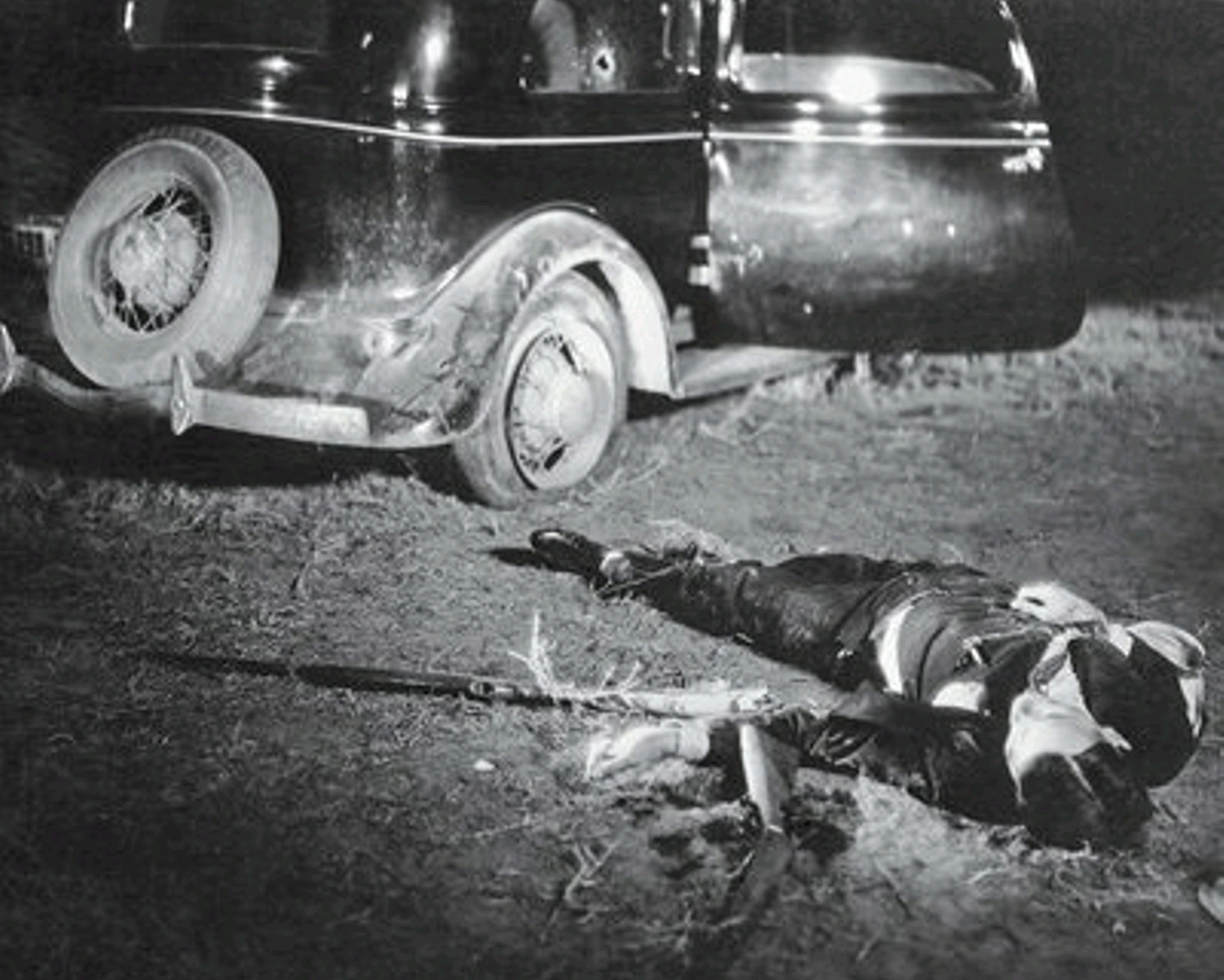
Crime scene of Thompson's police chase
