= Henry Roan =

Osage murder victim (1881–1923)

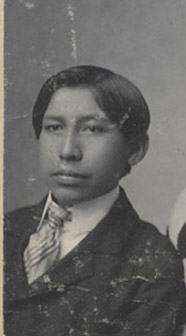
- Roan c. 1900
- Born: E-Stah-mo-sah; 1881; Osage Nation, U.S.
- Died: February 6, 1923 (aged 41–42); Osage County, Oklahoma, U.S.
- Cause of death: Gunshot wound
- Citizenship: Osage Nation
- Education: Carlisle Indian Industrial School
- Spouse: Mollie Kyle (divorced) Addie James (death) Mary Bunch (death)
- Relatives: James Roan Gray (great-grandson)

Henry Roan or E-Stah-mo-sah (1881—February 6/8, 1923) was an Osage man murdered during the Osage Indian murders. William King Hale was convicted as the mastermind of the most notorious of these murders—that of Roan. His murder led to the U.S. Supreme Court case United States v. Ramsey (1926).

William Belleau portrayed Roan in the 2023 film Killers of the Flower Moon.

== Biography ==
Henry Roan was born E-Stah-mo-sah in Indian Territory (which became Oklahoma) and raised in an Osage family from Hominy, Oklahoma. He attended the Carlisle Indian Industrial School between September 21, 1899, and June 21, 1904. Roan married Mollie Kyle in a traditional and arranged Osage marriage when he was 15. Shortly after the marriage he returned to Carlisle Indian Industrial School and they each remarried.

During Roan's lifetime, most Osage people were considered legally incompetent by the United States and required to have a guardian. Roan's guardian was Fred G. Drummond of the Oklahoma Drummond family. Roan owned several 160-acre (65-hectare) parcels of land which were mostly sold to his guardian. Roan was an alcoholic.

Roan married his second wife, Addie James, after returning from Carlisle. Addie died of tuberculosis and he remarried Mary Bunch. He was murdered on February 6 (or 8th), 1923. Roan was found in his Buick, with a gunshot wound to the back of his head. William King Hale held a $25,000 life insurance policy on Roan. Hale had referred to Roan as a "good friend" and served as a pallbearer at his funeral. Hale was convicted in federal court on October 29, 1929, for the murder of Roan and sent to the Leavenworth Penitentiary in Kansas.
