= Ernest Burkhart =

American murderer (1892–1986)

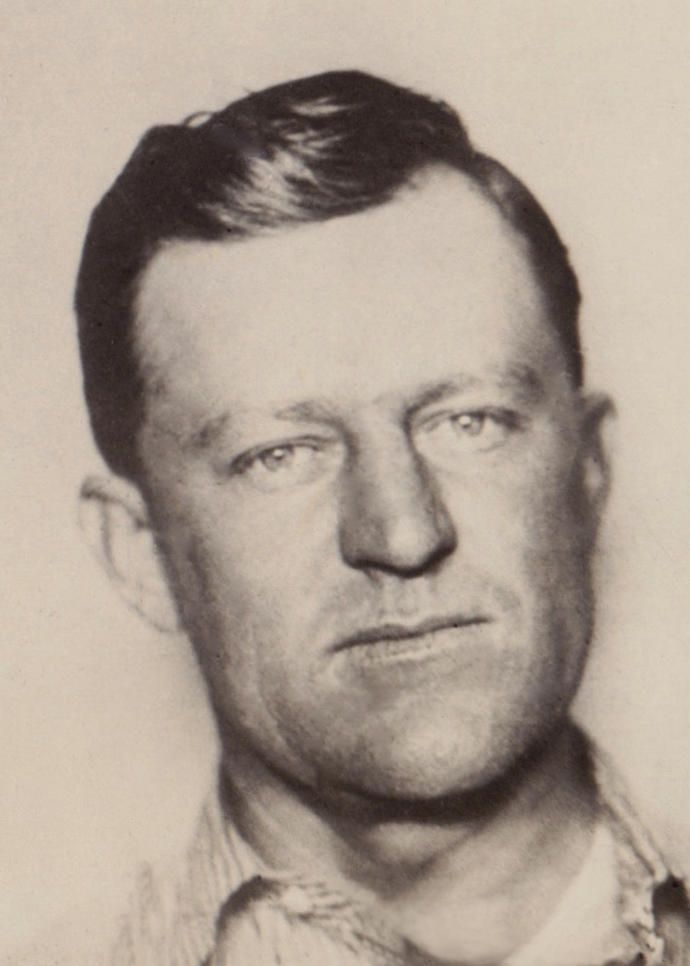
- Burkhart in the late 1920s
- Born: September 11, 1892; Greenville, Texas, U.S.
- Died: December 1, 1986 (aged 94); Cleveland, Oklahoma, U.S.
- Other names: Ernest George Burkhart, Ernest Burkhardt
- Known for: One of the perpetrators of the Osage Indian murders
- Spouse: Mollie Kyle (m. 1917; div. 1926)
- Children: 3
- Relatives: William King Hale (uncle)
- Convictions: Oklahoma; First degree murder Federal; Burglary (18 U.S.C. § 2114)
- Penalty: Oklahoma; Life imprisonment with hard labor (1926); Federal; 7 years imprisonment (1940)

Ernest George Burkhart (September 11, 1892 – December 1, 1986) was an American murderer who participated in the Osage Indian murders as a hitman for his uncle William King Hale's crime ring. He was convicted for the killing of William E. Smith in 1926, and sentenced to life imprisonment. Burkhart was paroled in 1937, but was sent back to prison for burglarizing his former sister-in-law's house in 1940. After being paroled for the final time in 1959, Burkhart was pardoned by Oklahoma governor Henry Bellmon in 1966 for his role in the Osage murders.

== Early life ==
Ernest George Burkhart was born on September 11, 1892, to a poor cotton farmer in Greenville, Texas. He was a nephew of William King Hale. In 1912, aged nineteen, Burkhart moved into his uncle's ranch at Fairfax, Osage County, in search of fortune after the discovery of oil in the region. Five years later in 1917, he married an Osage woman by the name of Mollie Kyle (Molly Kile). Burkhart later plotted to kill her to inherit the Kyle family's headrights and oil money, which was worth $7 million at the time ($176 million in 2025).

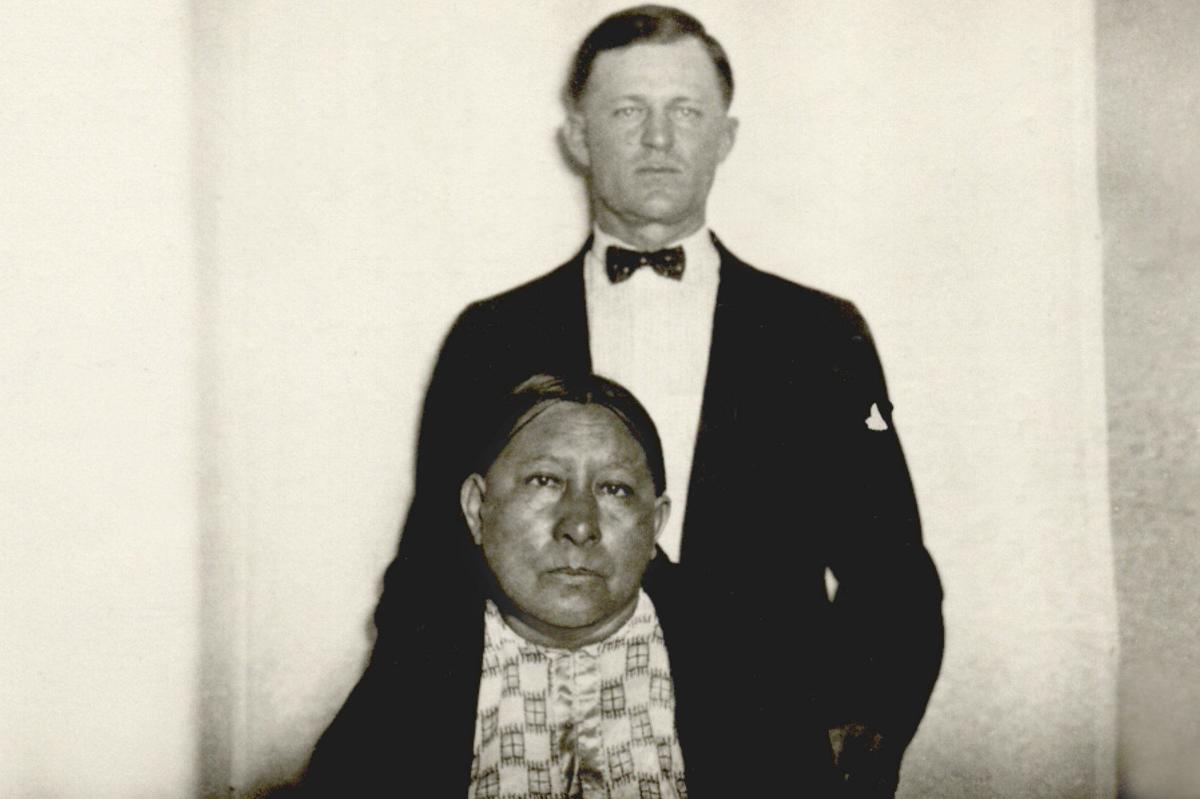
Burkhart and Mollie in 1917

Burkhart had three children with Kyle: Elizabeth (1918–2006), James "Cowboy" (1920–1990), and Anna (1922–1926).

== Murders ==
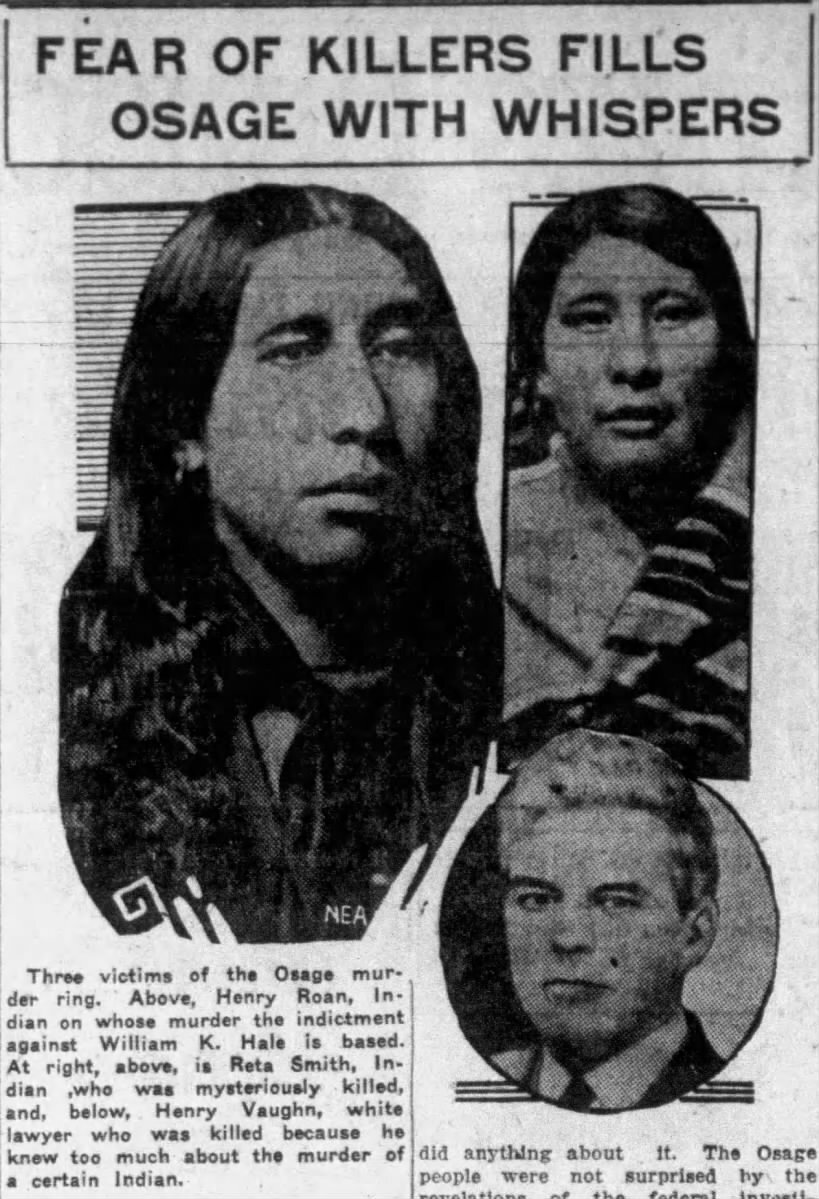
1926 newspaper illustration of Henry Roan, Rita Smith, and William Vaughn

Hale and his nephews Ernest and Byron Burkhart conspired to kill several (Note: While Hale was convicted only for the murder of Henry Roan, his involvement in other murders is widely accepted by historians.) Osage people for their headrights after Ernest married Mollie Kyle, an Osage:

- On May 27, 1921, Hale hired Kelsie Morrison to kill Mollie's sister, Anna Brown; her body was found near a ravine. Morrison later confessed to the murder saying Hale had hired him in exchange for forgiving a $600 debt Morrison owed. Anna's estate was worth $100,000 ($3 million in 2025). Half of Anna's headrights were inherited by her mother Lizzie Q, who died 60 days later. Her other heirs were Mollie, Rita Smith, and Grace Bigheart.

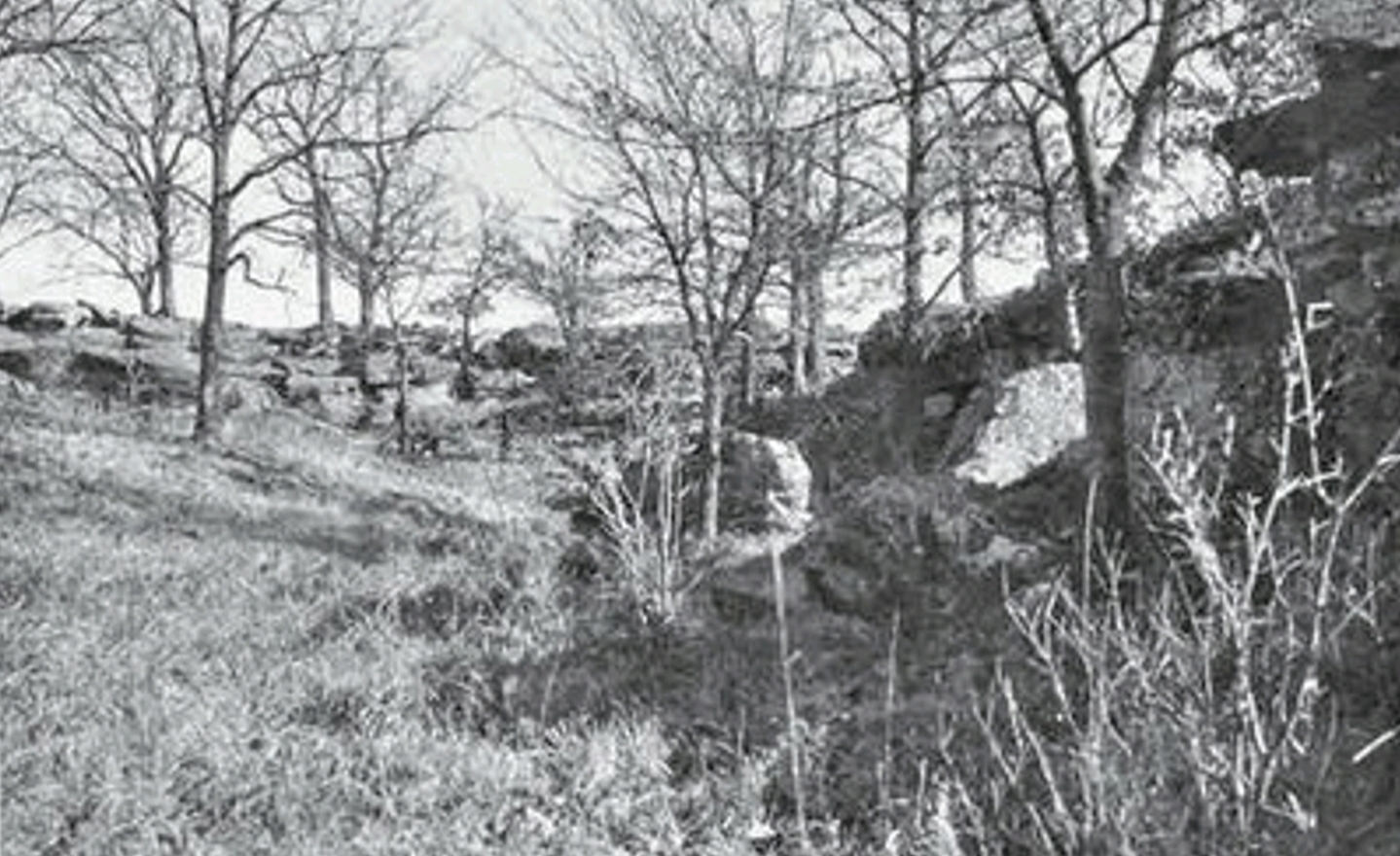
The ravine where Anna Brown's body was found

- A cousin of Mollie's, Charles Whitehorn, was shot dead a few weeks after Anna.
- Approximately two months after Anna's death, her mother, Lizzie Q, died in July 1921 under suspicious circumstances (possibly poisoning) in Burkhart's house. Her estate was worth $250,000 ($6 million in 2025).
- Late in 1921, Joe Grayhorse, an Osage, died immediately after a land deal with Hale, and was found near Pawhuska.
- On March 26, 1922, Anna Sanford died under mysterious circumstances after marrying Tom McCoy. In the aftermath of Sanford's death, McCoy married Hale's niece.
- In 1922, Mollie's sister Minnie Kile died under suspicious circumstances. She was the wife of W. E. Smith.
- On January 15, 1923, another cousin of Mollie's, Henry Roan, was found dead, four miles north-west of Fairfax, shot in the head inside his car. Hale held a $25,000 life insurance policy on Roan ($595,000 in 2023). Hale referred to Roan as a "good friend" and served as a pallbearer at his funeral. Hale was later convicted for the murder of Roan.
- In 1923, George Bigheart was taken to Oklahoma City for treatment after drinking poisoned whiskey. Hale and Ernest took Bigheart to the hospital where he asked to see his attorney William Vaughn. Vaughn was killed on the railroad right-of-way outside Pawhuska, Oklahoma the next day after consulting with Bigheart. Bigheart later died as well.
- On March 10, 1923, Rita Smith (Mollie's sister), her husband (W. E. Smith), and a housekeeper (Nettie Brookshire), were killed when the Smiths' home was bombed; Mollie inherited Rita's headrights.

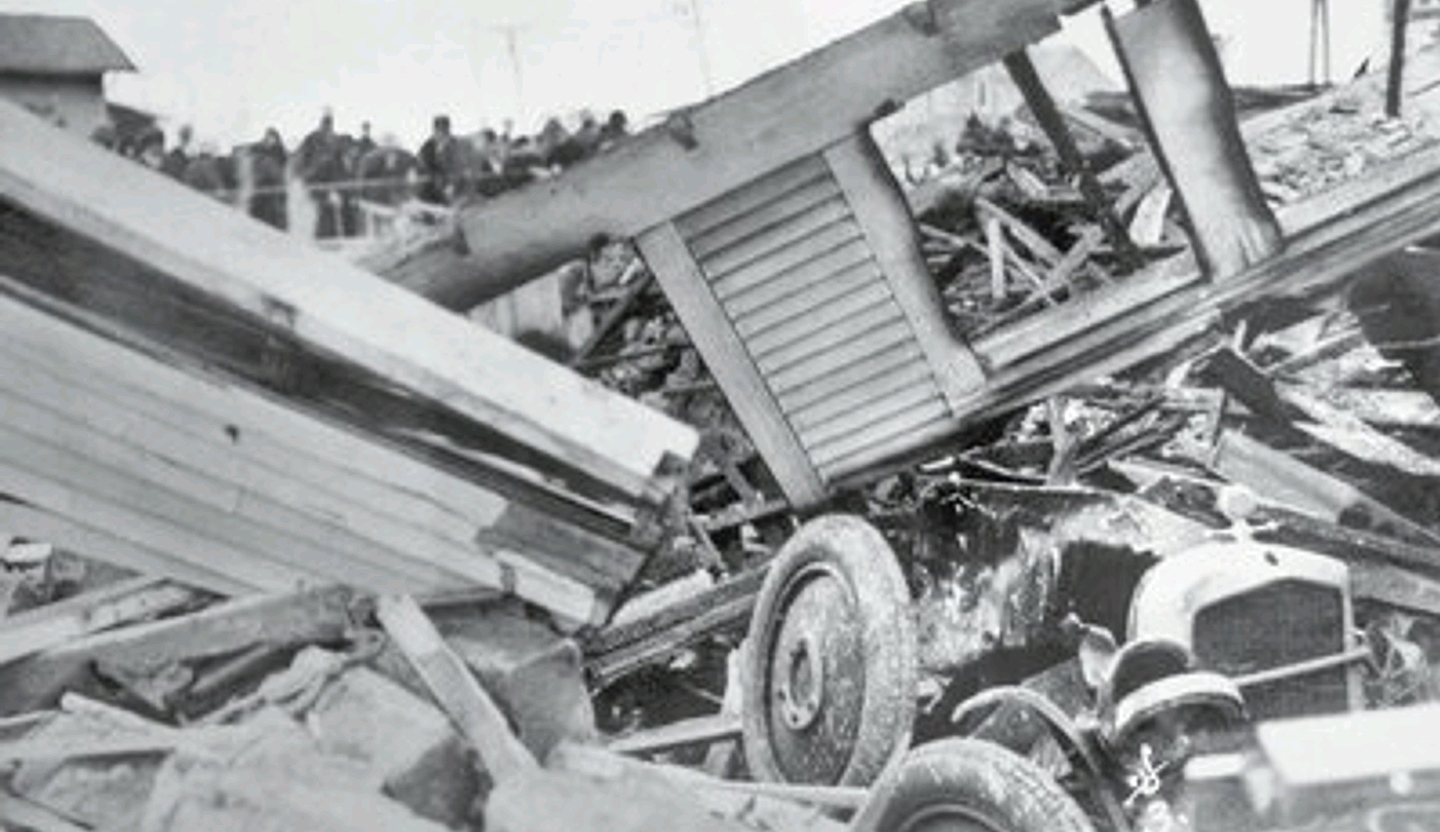
Aftermath of the bombing

Mollie later suffered symptoms of poisoning. She fell ill, but soon discovered that Burkhart was poisoning her. She moved away to Pawhuska after the bombing of her sister's house and made a full recovery. Mollie divorced Ernest in 1926, and their children inherited Mollie's estate. Hale's full plan is suspected to have involved the unrealized murders of Mollie, Ernest, and their children, leaving the Kile-Burkhart estate solely to Hale.

=== Arrest and conviction ===
A warrant for Hale and Ernest's arrest was issued on January 4, 1926, for the murders of Bill and Rita Smith. Ernest was apprehended immediately, but Hale could not be found. According to David Grann, Hale later turned himself in wearing "a perfectly pressed suit, shoes shined to a gleam, a felt hat, and an overcoat with his diamond-studded Masonic lodge pin fastened to the lapel." Hale maintained his innocence, so federal agents focused on interrogating Ernest; he broke and turned state's evidence after being confronted with outlaw Blackie Thompson (who had been in state custody for murdering a police officer) willing to testify that Ernest tried to hire him to do the killings. When confronted with Ernest's testimony, Hale maintained his innocence.

==== Trial ====
Hale was tried alongside John Ramsey, an accomplice in the Osage murders, in July 1926 for the murder of Henry Roan in federal court (after the United States Supreme Court case United States v. Ramsey (1926) held that federal courts had jurisdiction) in Guthrie, Oklahoma. By the time of their first trial, Ernest Burkhart had been sentenced to life imprisonment in Oklahoma courts. While his uncle was sent to Leavenworth Penitentiary in Kansas in October 1929 after being found guilty of murder, Burkhart was sent to the Oklahoma State Penitentiary in McAlester after being found guilty on June 21, 1926.

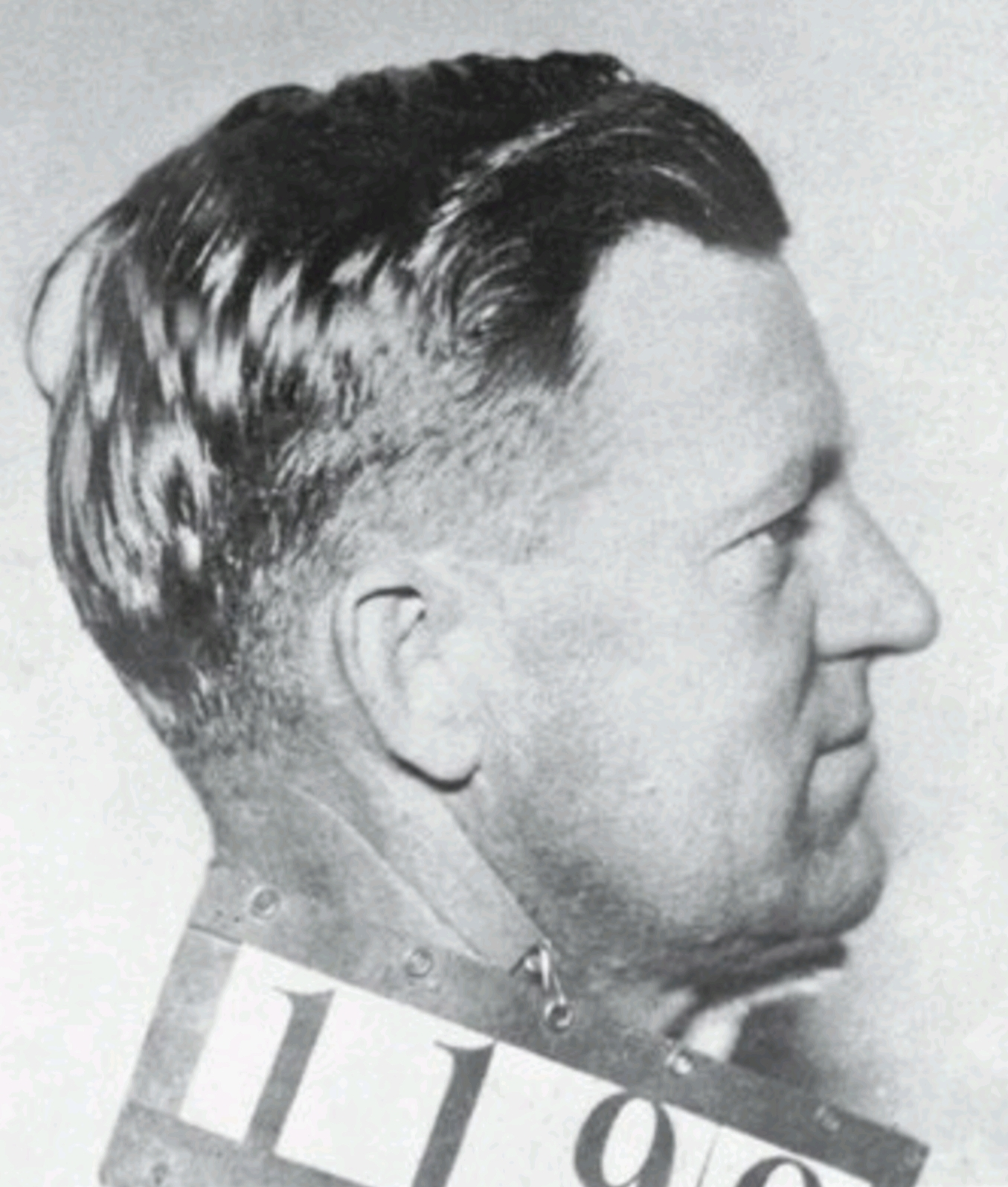
1926 mugshot of Burkhart

== Later life and death ==
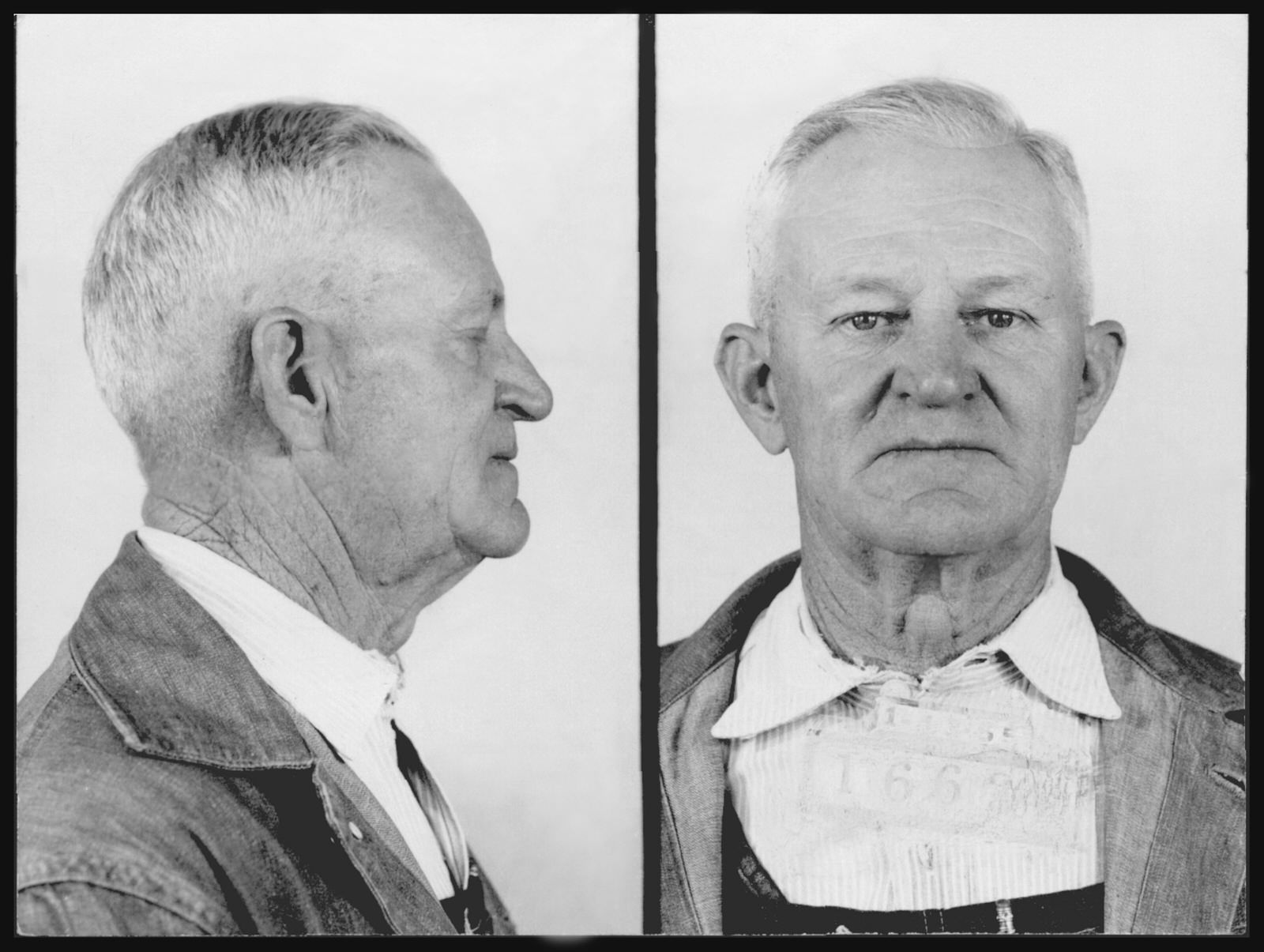
Ernest Burkhart in 1959

Ernest Burkhart was paroled in 1937, after serving 11 years. Only three years later, he and a woman named Clara Mae Goad robbed Burkhart's former sister-in-law's house, stealing $7,000 ($160,867 in 2025). They were arrested and found guilty of federal burglary charges. In 1940, Ernest was sentenced to seven years in prison and had his parole revoked. He was paroled once more in 1959, and later pardoned by Oklahoman governor Henry Bellmon in 1966 for the Osage murders, after a 3-2 ruling in the Oklahoma Pardon and Parole Board.

After his release from prison, Burkhart moved back to Osage County to live with his brother Byron. Later he moved to Cleveland, Oklahoma, living in a "mice-infested" trailer. Burkhart died at the age of 94 on December 1, 1986, in Cleveland. His will stated that he wanted to be cremated and his ashes spread around the Osage Hills. His son James "chucked it over a bridge" instead.

== In popular culture ==
Burkhart is a key figure in David Grann's 2017 nonfiction book Killers of the Flower Moon. In the 2023 film of the same name, directed by Martin Scorsese, Burkhart is portrayed by Leonardo DiCaprio.
