= Henry Grammer =

American cowboy and murderer (1883–1923)

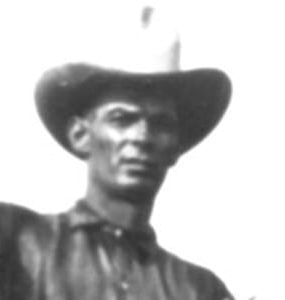
- Born: July 20, 1883; Marlin, Texas, U.S.
- Died: June 14, 1923 (aged 39); Shidler, Oklahoma, U.S.
- Occupations: Cowboy, bootlegger
- Known for: Suspect in the perpetrators of the Osage Indian murders
- Awards: National Rodeo Hall of Fame inductee (posthumous)

Henry F. Grammer (July 20, 1883 – June 14, 1923) was an American cowboy, bootlegger and murderer from Texas. In 1904, he was convicted of murder in Montana. He later moved to Oklahoma, where he is suspected as one of the perpetrators of the Osage Indian murders. In 1920, he was acquitted of killing a ranch hand, but in 1923 he died under suspicious circumstances whilst a federal investigation into the Osage murders was ongoing. For his career as a cowboy, he was posthumously inducted into the National Rodeo Hall of Fame in 2000.

== Early life and conviction ==
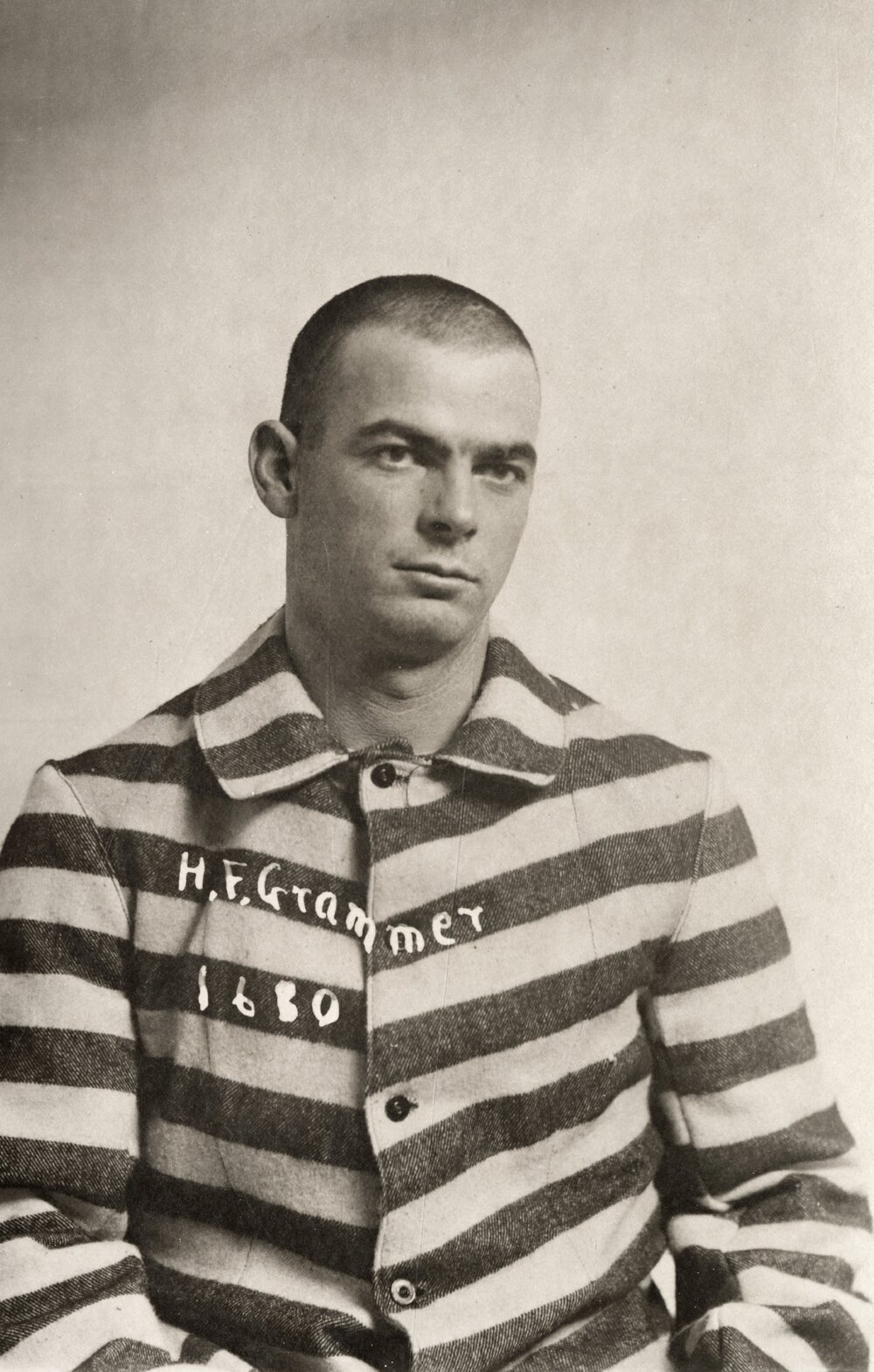
Nov. 29, 1904. Prison portrait of Henry F. Grammer from when he was received as a prisoner at the Montana State Prison in Deer Lodge, Montana.

Henry Grammer was born on July 20, 1883, near Marlin, Texas where he was raised. By age 15 both of his parents had died, and he began working in the Texas rodeo circuit. Around 1901, he first moved to the Osage Nation (later Osage County, Oklahoma after Oklahoma statehood in 1907). In 1904, he was arrested in Montana for murdering sheepshearer L.A. Houtaling in Montana. He was charged with murder, but convicted on a lesser charge of manslaughter and served three years in prison.

== Rodeos ==
After his release, Grammer returned to Osage County. He participated in rodeos from Fort Worth, Texas to Madison Square Garden in New York City. He participated in the annual Dewey, Oklahoma "Dewey Roundup" every year between 1908 and 1922. From 1909 to 1910, he traveled across South America touring with J. Ellison Carroll and the IXL Wild West Show. In 1912, he helped Guy Weadick stage and participated in the first Calgary Stampede. In 1914, he toured in London with the 101 Ranch Wild West Show. In 1916, at Weadick's Sheepshead Bay Stampede, he won the title "World Champion Steer Roper." From 1920 to 1922 he was a judge at the annual Fort Worth Fat Stock Show Rodeo.

== Osage Indian murders ==
In the 1920s Grammer ran the moonshine industry in Osage County. He employed many individuals who were also local thieves, robbers, and cattle rustlers. Writer David Grann alleged in his 2017 book on the murders that Grammer had ties to the Kansas City Mob. His operation included at least five stills and a small power plant to supply electricity. In August 1920, he was acquitted for the killing of Jim Berry, a ranch hand employed by his brother-in-law.

Grammer had met rancher William King Hale in 1909 when they competed in a rodeo together. When Rita and Bill Smith's house was blown up during the Osage Indian murders, Grammer was Hale's alibi, as the pair had traveled to the Fort Worth Fat Stock Show Rodeo during the bombing.

== Death and legacy ==
Grammer died in an automobile accident on June 14, 1923, when his Cadillac spun out and flipped near Shidler, Oklahoma. David Grann alleges William King Hale may have been involved in his death by tampering with the steering wheel and brakes.

In 2000, Grammer was posthumously inducted into the National Rodeo Hall of Fame.

=== Representation in other media ===
He was portrayed by Sturgill Simpson in the 2023 film Killers of the Flower Moon, about the Osage murders.
