= William King Hale =

American cattleman and murderer (1874–1962)

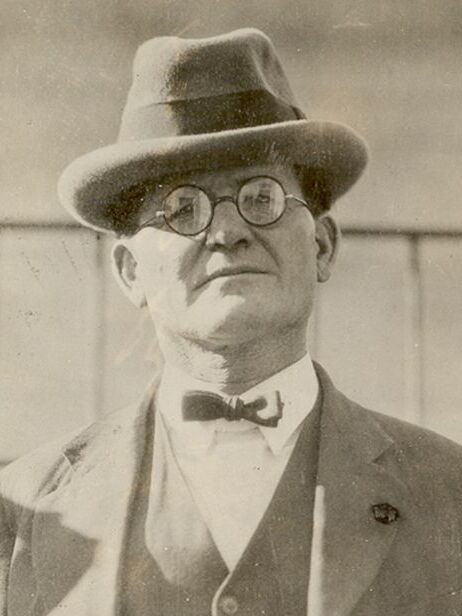
- Hale in 1922
- Born: December 24, 1874; Hunt County, Texas, U.S. (Note: Jason Christian of This Land Press identifies his birthplace as Greenville, and David Grann gives Campbell in Killers of the Flower Moon.)
- Died: August 15, 1962 (aged 87); Phoenix, Arizona, U.S.
- Burial place: Wichita, Kansas
- Occupation: Cattleman
- Known for: Being a major perpetrator of the Osage Indian murders
- Political party: Democratic
- Relatives: Ernest Burkhart (nephew)
- Status: Paroled (1947)
- Conviction: First degree murder
- Penalty: Life imprisonment (1929)

William King Hale (December 24, 1874 – August 15, 1962) was an American murderer and crime boss in Osage County, Oklahoma, who was responsible for the most infamous of the Osage Indian murders. He made a fortune through cattle ranching, contract killings, and insurance fraud before his arrest and conviction for murder.

Born in Hunt County, Texas, Hale worked as a cowboy in Texas and Indian Territory before settling in what would become Osage County around 1900. By the 1920s, he had amassed substantial influence in the county when he ordered the contract killings of Osage woman Mollie Kyle's family in a criminal conspiracy to gain control of their headrights. He was convicted in federal court for ordering the murder of Henry Roan in October 1929, sentenced to life in prison, and released on parole in July 1947. Hale died in Arizona in 1962.

His role in the killings is a major focus of David Grann's 2017 book Killers of the Flower Moon. Robert De Niro portrayed him in Martin Scorsese's 2023 film adaptation of the book.

== Early life ==
William Hale was born in Hunt County, Texas, on December 24, 1874. His mother died when he was three years old. At age sixteen he began working as a cowboy in West Texas, and by 18 was running cattle on the Kiowa-Comanche reservation in Indian Territory. At the turn of the 20th century, he settled in the Osage Nation (then Oklahoma Territory, now Osage County, Oklahoma), and by 1900 his wife had joined him where they lived in a tent and raised cattle. By 1905, he moved to Gray Horse, an Osage town, to manage a ranch, and by 1907 he partnered with local bankers to buy his own ranch. Hale was reportedly uneducated, but amassed a fortune through insurance fraud and unfair trade with the native Osage people. Tom White, the FBI special agent in charge of investigating Hale, wrote in a 1932 memo to FBI Director J. Edgar Hoover:

Eventually (Hale) became a millionaire, who dominated local politics and seemingly could not be punished for any of the many crimes ...His method of building up power and prestige was... by means of gifts and favors.

He proclaimed himself "King of the Osage", owned a controlling interest of the Fairfax bank, and a part interest in the town's general store and funeral home; He also served as a reserve deputy sheriff for Fairfax. In addition, he owned a 5,000-acre (20 km^{2}) ranch (and leased another 45,000 acres (180 km^{2}) from Osage landowners).

== Murders ==
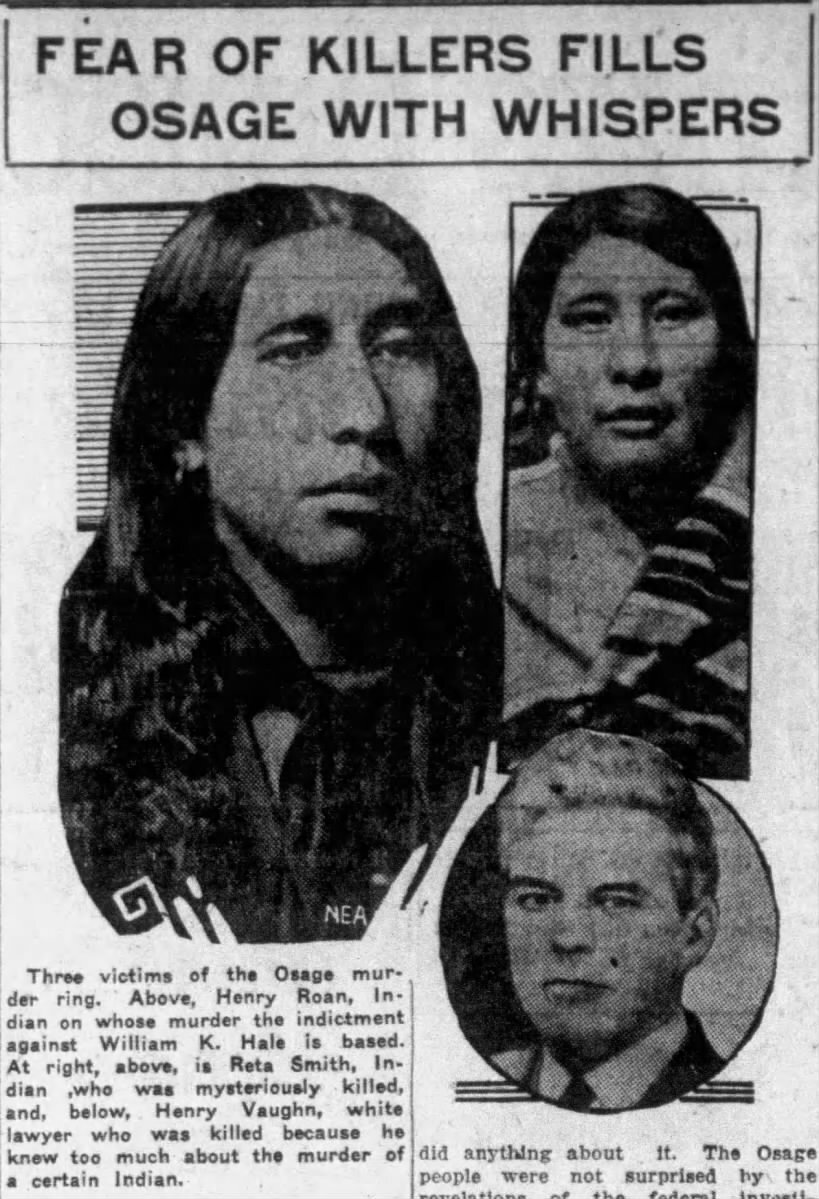
1926 newspaper illustration of Henry Roan, Reta Smith, and William Vaughn

Hale and his nephews, Ernest and Byron Burkhart, conspired to kill several (Note: While Hale was only convicted for the murder of Henry Roan, his involvement in other murders is widely accepted by historians.) Osage people for their Osage headrights after Ernest married Mollie Kyle, a native Osage:

- In May 1921, Hale hired Kelsie Morrison to kill Mollie's sister Anna Brown. Morrison later confessed to the murder saying Hale had hired him in exchange for forgiving a $600 debt Morrison owed. Half of Anna's headrights were inherited by her mother Lizzie Q, who died exactly sixty days later. Her other heirs were Mollie, Reta Smith, and Grace Bigheart.
- A cousin, Charles Whitehorn, was shot and killed a few weeks later.
- In March 1922, Anna Sanford died under mysterious circumstances after marrying Tom McCoy. After Sanford's death, McCoy married Hale's niece.
- In 1923, George Bigheart was taken to Oklahoma City for treatment after drinking poisoned whiskey. Hale and Ernest took Bigheart to the hospital where he asked to see his attorney William Vaughn. Vaughn was killed on the railroad right-of-way outside Pawhuska, Oklahoma the next day after consulting with Bigheart. Bigheart later died as well.
- In February 1923, another cousin, Henry Roan, was found shot dead in his car. Hale held a $25,000 life insurance policy on Roan. Hale referred to Roan as a "good friend" and served as a pallbearer at his funeral. Hale was later convicted for the murder of Roan.
- In March 1923, Reta Smith, her husband, and a housekeeper were killed when the Smiths' home was bombed. Mollie inherited Reta's headrights.

Mollie later suffered symptoms of poisoning. Mollie fell ill, but later discovered the poisoning and recovered when she moved away. She divorced Ernest afterward, and their children inherited Mollie's estate. Hale's full plan is suspected to have involved the unrealized murders of Mollie, Ernest, and their children, leaving the Kyle-Burkhart estate solely to Hale.

=== Investigations ===
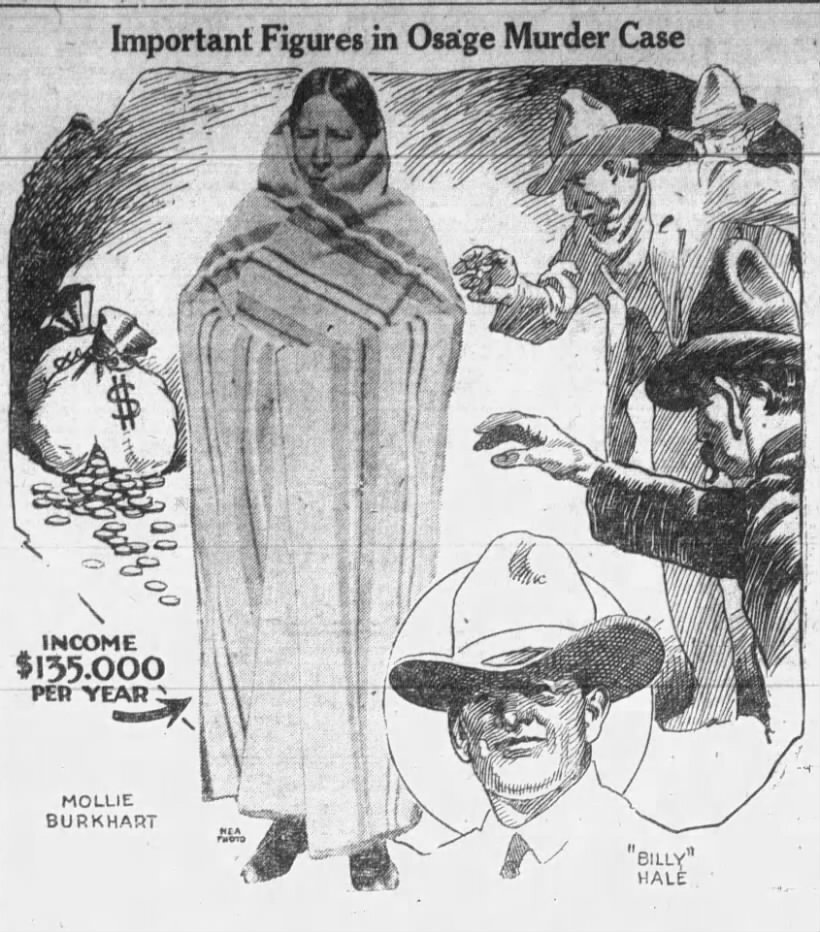
Political cartoon depicting Mollie Kyle and William Hale from the Enid Morning News Sunday edition on February 7, 1926

Hale was a segregationist and an influential member of the Democratic Party in Osage County. He had considerable influence over the local Osage County prosecutor. During his election campaign, the prosecutor sought Hale's endorsement and after receiving it won every precinct near Hale's ranch. Hale used this connection to confer with local investigators during the initial investigation of Anna Brown's murder. After Henry Roan's body was discovered in a ravine, Hale accompanied the deputy and marshal to recover the body. In 1921, Hale hired a private investigator to look into the murders. The investigator later revealed to federal agents that he was hired, not to solve the murders but to manufacture evidence and to coach witnesses to "shape an alibi" for Hale and his accomplices. A Bureau of Investigation (BOI) (Note: Later renamed the Federal Bureau of Investigation (FBI).) report eventually concluded the chief of Ponca City Police, chief of Fairfax Police, Osage County prosecutor and local Office of Indian Affairs agent were all under Hale's influence and would not be able to assist the investigation.

The Osage Nation Tribal Council requested the Bureau of Investigation to examine the murders. The Bureau sent undercover agents to investigate. Investigators initially had trouble finding witnesses with Dick Gregg, a former member of the Al Spencer gang, being the only living witness. Gregg told investigators Hale had attempted to hire the Al Spencer gang to kill Bill and Reta Smith, but Spencer, the leader of the gang, had declined because killing a woman was "not my style". Gregg pointed investigators to Al Spencer, Henry Grammer, and Curley Johnson as having more information, but the three men were already dead. Eventually, a safecracker associated with Grammer named Asa Kirby as the bomber, but before agents could interview Kirby he was shot dead in a "failed jewel heist". Investigators believed that to orchestrate the killing, Hale had tipped off Kirby and the store owner as to a potential heist of a shipment of diamonds. After this revelation, investigators began to believe Hale was possibly murdering witnesses, with some accusations he tampered with Grammer's car brakes and had poisoned Johnson. Eventually, Burt Lawson, a man serving a prison sentence in McAlester, Oklahoma, came forward to testify he was instructed by Hale and Ernest Burkhart to plant the explosive device in the Smiths' home.

Hale generated additional suspicion when he brought suit to collect a life insurance policy for Henry Roan. Hale had bought the life insurance policy in 1921; after his first application had been denied, he reapplied to a second life insurance company with a note signed by Roan certifying that Roan owed Hale $25,000 and was approved. When obtaining the required doctor's evaluation for the policy, Hale was asked by the doctor "Bill, what are you going to do, kill this Indian?" to which he responded "Hell yes".

Agents were also tipped off when they realized the order and methods of the murders appeared to be done in a particular fashion to maximize Mollie's inheritance. For example, Anna Brown was murdered first after her divorce to ensure that her inheritance went to family instead of her former husband and Reta and Bill Smith were killed simultaneously in a bombing to trigger a simultaneous death clause in their will.

=== Arrest and conviction ===
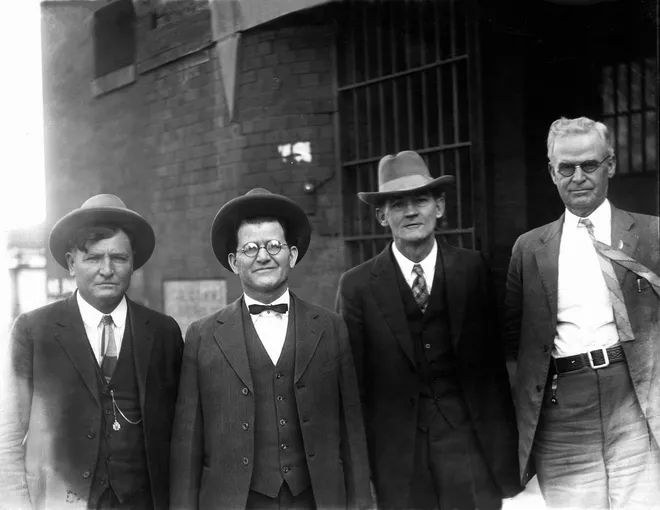
William Hale in 1926 (second from the left) and John Ramsey (third from left) flanked by two U.S. Marshals

A warrant for Hale and Ernest's arrest was issued on January 4, 1926, for the murders of Bill and Reta Smith. Ernest was apprehended immediately but Hale could not be found. According to David Grann, Hale turned himself in wearing "a perfectly pressed suit, shoes shined to a gleam, a felt hat, and an overcoat with his diamond-studded Masonic lodge pin fastened to the lapel". Hale maintained his innocence, so federal agents focused on interrogating Ernest; he broke and turned state's evidence after being confronted with outlaw Blackie Thompson (who had been in state custody for murdering a police officer) willing to testify that Ernest tried to hire him to do the killings. When confronted with Ernest's testimony, Hale maintained his innocence.

The Department of Justice wanted Hale to be tried in federal court, fearing his potential influence over Oklahoma state courts. A federal judge ruled the killing, which took place on an unalienated allotment, fell under the jurisdiction of Oklahoma courts. Hale legal counsel included former attorney general of Oklahoma Sargent Prentiss Freeling. The case was moved to state court and his first hearing was March 12. According to David Grann, he recited a poem to his supporters in the courtroom saying,

Judge Not! The clouds of seeming guilt may dim thy brother's fame

For Fate may throw suspicion's shade upon the brightest name.

While on trial in 1926, Hale sold his ranch to the Drummond family and the Mullendores family. The ranch land was later broken up and sold to smaller ranchers.

==== Trials ====
Hale was tried with John Ramsey in July 1926 for the murder of Henry Roan in federal court (after the United States Supreme Court case United States v. Ramsey (1926) held that federal courts had jurisdiction) in Guthrie, Oklahoma. By the time of their first trial, Ernest Burkhart had been sentenced to life imprisonment in Oklahoma courts. The jury began deliberations on August 20 and five days later Hale and Ramsey's first trial resulted in a hung jury. After the trial, several witnesses were indicted, tried, and convicted for taking bribes or giving threatened testimony. Hale and Ramsey's second trial was scheduled for late October. The trial was transferred to Oklahoma City. Ernest testified that Hale paid Ramsey a new Ford and $500 to kill Roan. Hale denied the allegations and claimed to be in Fort Worth at a livestock show during the bombing at the Smiths' house and that he had no reason to want Roan dead. Jury deliberations began on October 28 and the next morning the jury found them both guilty of first-degree murder and sentenced them to life in prison. Hale appealed and was retried. The case was retried in federal court in Guthrie, Oklahoma but ended in another hung jury. The next trial in Oklahoma City resulted in another guilty sentence, this time for 99 years. Hale appealed to the United States Court of Appeals for the Eighth Circuit and a new trial was ordered. Hale was tried a final time in federal court at Pawhuska, Oklahoma.

==== Leavenworth Penitentiary ====
He was convicted in federal court on October 29, 1929, for the murder of Henry Roan and sent to the Leavenworth Penitentiary in Kansas. The warden during his stay was Tom White, the man who had headed the investigation into the Osage Indian murders. Hale worked in the tuberculosis ward and on a prison farm. During his sentence he never admitted to the murders and a psychological evaluator noted "he has put behind him any feeling of shame or repentance he may have had".

== Parole and death ==
Hale was sentenced to life in prison but was paroled on July 31, 1947. During a visit, Hale's relatives said he once remarked, "If that damn Ernest had kept his mouth shut we'd be rich today." He moved to Phoenix, Arizona around 1950 and died in a nursing home there on August 15, 1962. He was buried in Wichita, Kansas.

== Legacy ==
In 1925, the United States Congress passed a law to bar the inheritance of Osage headrights from Osage people with over 1/2 blood quantum by non-Osage people to curb the Osage Indian Murders. Later, in 1978, Congress amended the 1925 legislation, eliminating the blood quantum requirement and adding language which extended inheritance of Osage mineral headrights to legally adopted children (Osage and non-Osage) of Osage people and the descendants of those adopted children, in addition to their direct lineal heirs.

=== In media ===
David Grann's 2017 book Killers of the Flower Moon reports Hale as a mastermind of murders with detailed evidence. In the 2023 film adaptation, directed by Martin Scorsese, Hale was portrayed by Robert De Niro, who received many awards and nominations, including an Academy Award nomination.
