= Osage Indian murders =

1910s–1930s murders in Oklahoma, US

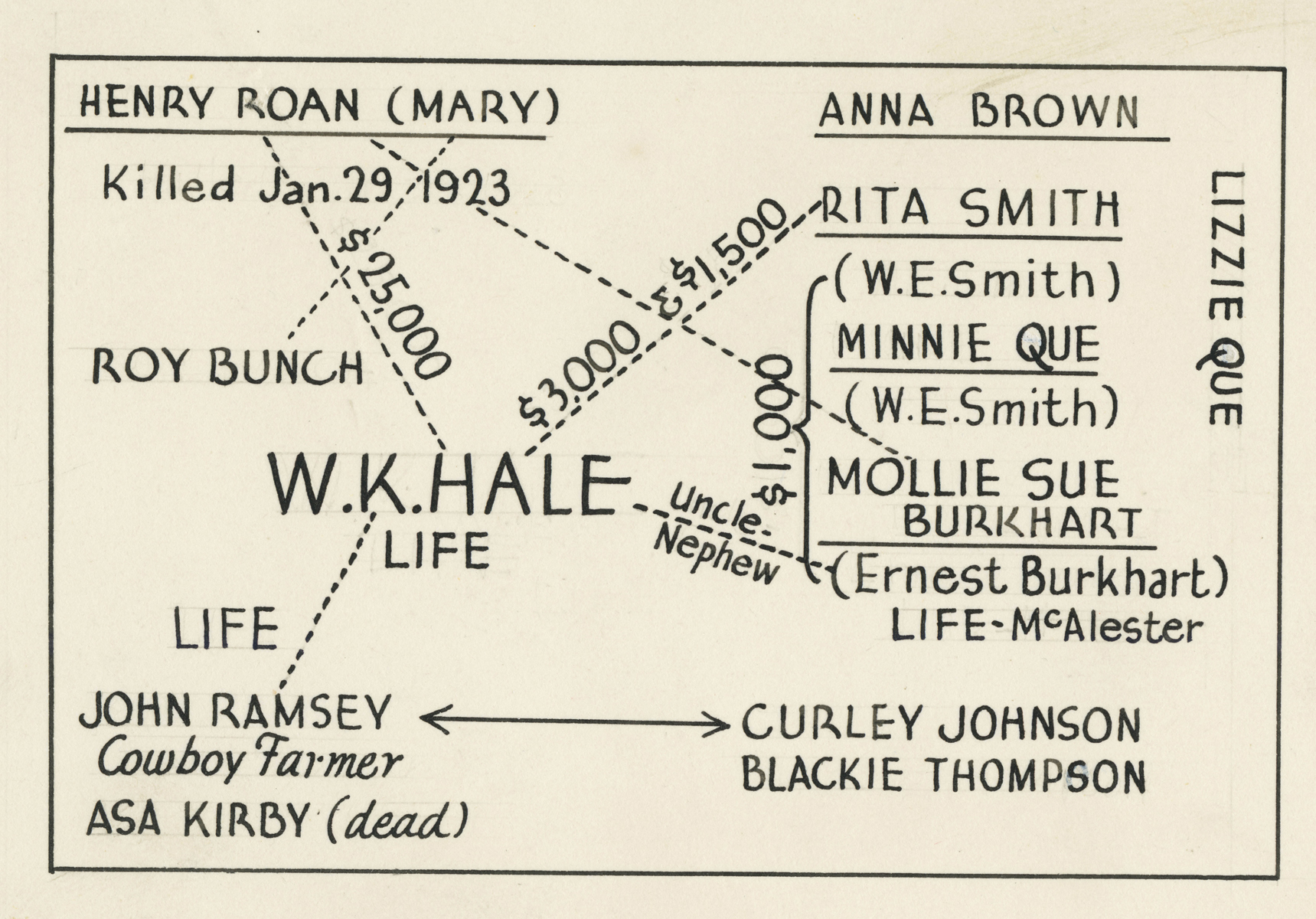
- This document in the "Hale–Ramsey Murder Case" is from the Oklahoman Collection at the Oklahoma Historical Society photo archives.
- Location: Osage County, Oklahoma, United States
- Date: 1918–1931
- Target: Osage people
- Attack type: Shootings, poisonings
- Weapons: Knives, guns, poison, and explosives
- Deaths: 24+ (possibly hundreds)
- Perpetrators: William Hale and others
- Motive: Inheritance of oil rights
- Convicted: William Hale; Ernest Burkhart; John Ramsey; Kelsie Morrison

The Osage Indian murders was a serial killing event that took place in Osage County, Oklahoma, United States, during the 1910s–1930s. Newspapers described the increasing number of unsolved murders and deaths among young adults of the Osage Nation as the "Reign of Terror". Most took place between 1921 and 1926. At least 24 full-blood Osage persons were killed violently or died suspiciously between 1918 and 1931. More recent investigations by journalists indicate that other suspicious deaths during this time could have been misreported or covered-up murders, including those of individuals who were heirs to future fortunes. They suggest that the true death toll could have been significantly higher and may have been in the hundreds.

The tribe had retained mineral rights to its reservation. Each tribal member had what were known as headrights to the mineral rights on communal land. When valuable oil was found on their land and leases were sold for oil production, each member with headrights was paid a share of the lucrative annual royalties for leases by oil companies. In 1906 and subsequent years, US Congress passed a series of laws, ostensibly intended to help the Osage retain wealth, that created a system of guardianship for "minors and incompetents", as determined by and under the jurisdiction of Oklahoma's local county probate courts. The Oklahoma courts routinely found Native Americans to be incompetent without considering mental capacity. For example, a guardian was appointed for one Indian woman on the basis that her savings suggested a lack of spending which was evidence that she did not understand the value of money. Many guardians used their appointment to gain control over the ward's wealth for their own personal benefit. During this period, numerous white men married Osage women to become guardians of their estate.

Some of the murders were committed to enable whites to take over the headrights of Osage members when inheriting property after deaths. The Osage found minimal assistance from local law enforcement to investigate the deaths, as it was dominated by powerful whites working in their own interests. Later investigation, including that of the Bureau of Investigation (BOI, the precursor to the Federal Bureau of Investigation), revealed extensive corruption among local officials involved in the Osage guardian program, including lawyers and judges. Most of the murders were never prosecuted. Nevertheless, several perpetrators were convicted of murder, including William Hale, a powerful rancher who ordered the murders of his nephew's wife and other members of her family to gain control of their headrights and oil wealth. Two other perpetrators implicated with Hale, Henry Grammer and Asa Kirby, died under suspicious circumstances during the BOI investigation. Several others involved were convicted of lesser charges, such as perjury, witness tampering, and contempt of court, for attempting to impede the investigation.

In 1925, the US Congress changed the law to prohibit non-Osage from inheriting headrights from Osage with half or more Native American ancestry, in an effort to protect the Osage. The US government continued to manage the leases and royalties from oil-producing lands. Over decades, the tribe became increasingly concerned about these assets. In 2000, the Osage Nation filed a suit against the US Department of the Interior, alleging that it had not adequately managed the assets and paid people the royalties they were due. The suit was settled in 2011 for $380 million and commitments to improve program management.

== Background ==
The Osage tribe was forcibly relocated by the US government from their home in Kansas to a reservation in Oklahoma in the 1870s. In 1897, oil was discovered on the Osage Indian Reservation, present-day Osage County, Oklahoma. The US Department of the Interior managed leases for oil exploration and production on land owned by the Osage Nation through the Bureau of Indian Affairs and later managed royalties, paying individual allottees. As part of the process of preparing Oklahoma for statehood, the federal government allotted 657 acres (266 ha) to each Osage on the tribal rolls in 1907. Thereafter, they and their legal heirs, whether Osage or not, had headrights to royalties in oil production, based on their allotments of lands. The headrights could be inherited by legal heirs, including non-Osage. The tribe held the mineral rights communally and paid its members money from leases by a percentage related to their holdings.

By 1920, the market for oil had grown dramatically and brought much wealth to the Osage. In 1923 alone, the tribe took in more than $30 million (equivalent to $372 million in 2025). People across the US read about the Osage, called "the richest nation, clan, or social group of any race on earth, including the whites, man for man". Some Osage used their royalties to send their children to private schools. Others bought luxury cars, clothes, jewelry, and travels to Europe, and newspapers across the country covered their activities. Along with tens of thousands of oil workers, the oil boom attracted many white opportunists to Osage County. As the writer Robert Allen Warrior characterizes them, some were entrepreneurial, and others were criminal, seeking to separate the Osage from their wealth by murder if necessary.

Believing the Osage would not be able to manage their new wealth, the US Congress passed a law in 1921 which required that courts appoint guardians for each Osage of half-blood or more in ancestry, who would manage their royalties and financial affairs until they demonstrated "competency". Under the system, even minors who had less than half-Osage blood were required guardians, regardless of living parents. The courts appointed the guardians from local white lawyers or businessmen. The incentives for criminality were overwhelming. Such guardians often maneuvered legally to steal Osage land, their headrights, or royalties. Others were suspected of murdering their charges to gain the headrights.

At that time, eight lawyers were working in Pawhuska, the Osage County seat, which had 8,000 residents. The number of lawyers was said to be the same in Oklahoma City, which had 140,000 residents. In 1924, the Department of the Interior charged two dozen guardians of Osage with corruption in the administration of their duties related to their charges. All avoided punishment by legal settlement out of court. These guardians were believed to have swindled their charges out of millions of dollars. In 1929, $27 million was reported as still being held by the Guardian System, the organization set up to protect the financial interests of 883 Osage families in Osage County.

== Murders in Osage County ==
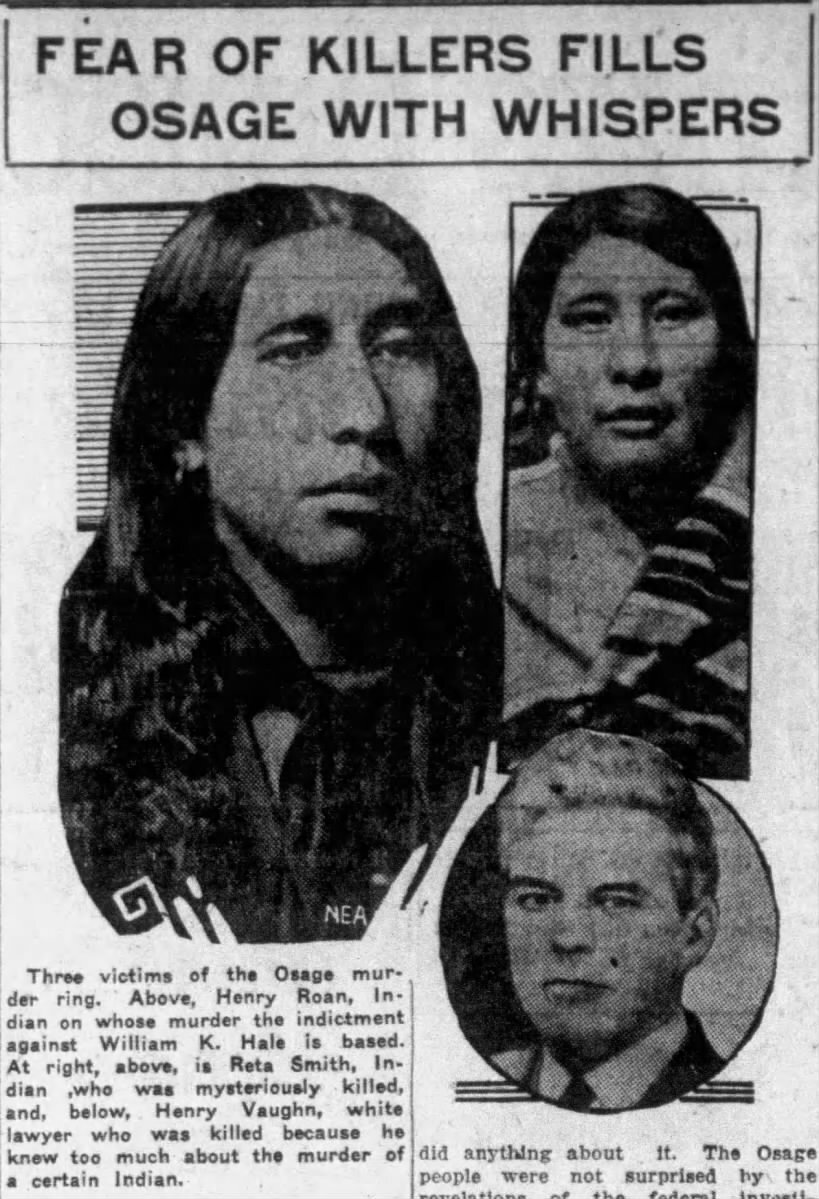
Henry Roan, Rita Smith, and William Vaughan

In the early 1920s, eighteen Osage and three non-Osage people in Osage County were reported murdered within a short period of time. Colorado newspapers reported the murders as the "Reign of Terror" on the Osage reservation. Some murders seemed associated with several members of one family.

On May 27, 1921, local hunters discovered the decomposing body of 36-year-old Anna Brown in a remote ravine of Osage County. Unable to find the killer, local authorities ruled her death as accidental because of alcohol poisoning and put the case aside. An autopsy revealed that the cause of death was not alcohol, but a bullet fired into the back of her head. Brown was divorced, so probate awarded her estate to her mother, Lizzie Q. Kyle. Kelsie Morrison, a petty criminal, later admitted to murdering Brown and testified that William Hale, a prominent local rancher, had asked him to do so.

Along with his admission, Morrison implicated Hale's nephew and Brown's ex-boyfriend, Byron Burkhart, in her murder. Morrison testified that, after meeting Brown earlier at her sister Mollie Kyle's home, he and Burkhart took a heavily intoxicated Brown to Three Mile Creek, where Morrison shot and killed her. Morrison was also responsible for the murders of William Stepson, who died of a suspected poisoning in 1922, and Tillie Powell Morrison, who died of a suspected poisoning in 1923. One of Morrison's associates later said he had confessed to both murders to him.

Morrison received a life sentence in 1926 for his participation in the Brown murder. However, in January 1931, his conviction was overturned because he had been promised immunity in exchange for his testimony for the prosecution against others involved in the murders. He was released from prison on July 16, 1931, after completing a separate sentence for assault with intent to kill. Morrison, 38, was killed in a shootout with police on May 25, 1937.

The body of another Osage, Brown's cousin Charles Whitehorn, also known as Charles Williamson, was discovered near Pawhuska on the same day as hers. Whitehorn had been shot to death. Two months later, Lizzie Q. Kyle was killed. Local authorities had initially ruled that Lizzie's death was due to old age. By that time, Lizzie had headrights for herself and had inherited the headrights from her late Osage husband and two daughters. Her heirs became fabulously wealthy.

In 1922, the Osage approached white oilman Barney A. McBride for help. McBride traveled to Washington, D.C. to enlist the aid of the federal government in investigating the murders. On the night of his arrival at a boarding house in the capital, he received a telegram that told him to be careful. After playing billiards and exiting from a club that same evening, an assailant tied a burlap sack around McBride's head and stabbed him over twenty times. The following morning, McBride's naked body was found in a Maryland culvert. McBride's murder later made the headline of The Washington Times newspaper on August 12, 1922.

On February 6, 1923, Henry Roan, another cousin of Brown's, also known as Henry Roan Horse, was found in his car on the Osage Reservation, dead from a shot in the head. Roan had a financial connection with Hale, having borrowed $1,200 from the cattleman. Hale fraudulently arranged to make himself the beneficiary of Roan's $25,000 (equivalent to $472,000 in 2025) life insurance policy. On March 10, 1923, a bomb destroyed the Fairfax residence of Anna's sister Rita Smith, killing Rita and her servant, Nettie Brookshire. Rita's husband, Bill Smith, sustained massive injuries from the blast and died four days later. Shortly before his death, Bill gave a statement implicating his suspected murderers and appointed his wife's estate. Later investigations revealed that the bomb contained 5 US gallons (19 L) of nitroglycerin.

On June 28, 1923, Hale and Burkhart put George Bigheart on a train to Oklahoma City to be taken to a hospital. George Bigheart was the son of James Bigheart, the last hereditary Osage chief. Hale was Bigheart's neighbor and friend, and had recently been designated by the court as Bigheart's guardian. The hospital doctors suspected that Bigheart had ingested poisoned whiskey. Bigheart called white attorney William Watkins "W. W." Vaughan, (Note: The attorney's name is given as the correct W. W. Vaughan in some sources (such as Fixico) and as the incorrect Vaught in others (such as Farris). He was sometimes called "Will". He was born on May 18, 1869, in Knox County, Kentucky; died on June 29, 1923, in Oklahoma; and was buried in Pawhuska Cemetery in Pawhuska, Osage County, Oklahoma. Killers of the Flower Moon (2017) dedicates one chapter to W. W. Vaughan. It is clear that the correct name is Vaughan, as Grann wrote about interviews with two of Vaughan's grandchildren, Martha and Melville of Pawhuska.) asking him to come to the hospital as soon as possible for an urgent meeting. Vaughan complied, and the two men met that night. Bigheart had said he had suspicions about who was behind the murders and had access to incriminating documents that would prove his claims.

Vaughan boarded a train that night to return to Pawhuska. In the morning, he was missing when the Pullman porter went to wake him. His berth on the train had not been used. Vaughan's naked body was later found with his skull crushed, beside the railroad tracks near Pershing, about 5 miles (8 km) south of Pawhuska. The documents Bigheart had given him were missing. Vaughan's body was so badly disfigured that the coroner could not be certain whether the man had fallen off the train or else been beaten first and then pushed off. The coroner ruled the cause of death was "suspicious", but did not rule that it was murder. Bigheart died at the hospital that same morning.

Thirteen other deaths of full-blooded Osage men and women, who had guardians appointed by the courts, were reported between 1921 and 1923. By 1925, at least twenty-four wealthy Osage had died and their land (and headrights) had been inherited or deeded to their guardians, who were local white lawyers and businessmen. The Bureau of Investigation (BOI), which preceded the Federal Bureau of Investigation (FBI), sent investigators to the reservation and found a low-level market in contract killers to kill the Osage for their wealth. In 1995, writer Robert Allen Warrior wrote about walking through an Osage cemetery and seeing "the inordinate number of young people who died during that time."

In 1925, Osage tribal elders, with the help of local law officer James Monroe Pyle, sought assistance from the BOI when local and state officials could not solve the rising number of murders. Pyle presented his evidence of murder and conspiracy and requested an investigation. The BOI sent Tom White to lead an investigation. Because of the numerous leads and perception that the local police were corrupt, White decided he would be the public face of the investigation, and most of the agents would work undercover. The other agents recruited were: a former New Mexico sheriff; a former Texas Ranger; John Burger, who had worked on the previous investigation; Frank Smith; and John Wren, a member of the Ute Nation who had previously been a spy for the Mexican revolutionaries.

== Investigation ==
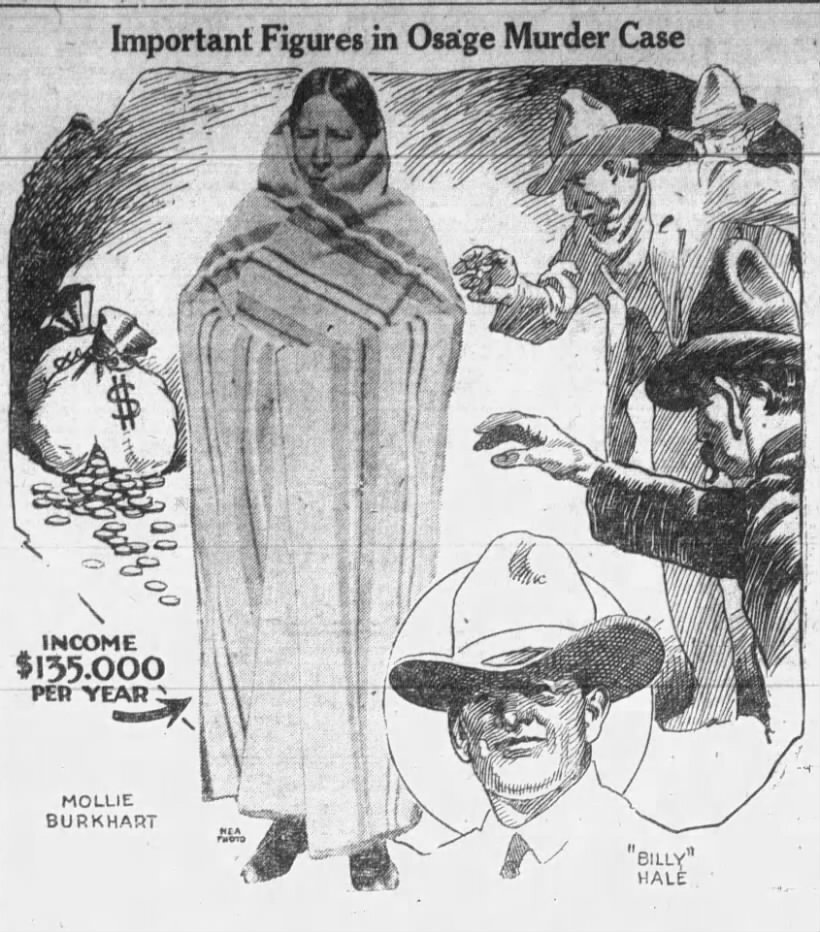
A political cartoon depicts Mollie Burkhart and William King Hale from the Enid Morning News, Sunday edition on February 7, 1926.

The Osage Tribal Council suspected that Hale was responsible for many of the deaths. The Commissioner of Indian Affairs in the Department of the Interior sent four agents to act as undercover investigators. Working for two years, the agents discovered a crime ring led by Hale, known in Osage County as the "King of Osage". Hale and his nephews, Ernest and Byron Burkhart, had migrated from Texas to Osage County to find jobs in the oil fields. Once there, they discovered the immense wealth of members of the Osage Nation from royalties being paid from leases on oil-producing lands. Hale's goal was to gain the headrights and wealth of several tribe members, including those of Mollie Kyle and her family.

To gain part of the wealth, Hale persuaded Ernest to marry Mollie, a full-blooded Osage. Hale then arranged for the murders of Mollie's sisters, her brother-in-law, her mother, and her cousin, Henry Roan, to cash in on the insurance policies and headrights of each family member.

As the BOI investigation of the conspiracy expanded, other witnesses and participants were murdered too. Mollie and Ernest Burkhart inherited all of the headrights from her family. Investigators soon discovered that Mollie was already being poisoned.

Ernest Burkhart's attempt to kill his wife failed. Mollie, a devout Catholic, had told her priest that she feared she was being poisoned at home. The priest told her not to touch liquor under any circumstances. He also alerted one of the BOI agents. Mollie recovered from the poison she had already consumed and divorced Ernest after the trials. She later married again. Mollie Burkhart Cobb died of unrelated causes on June 16, 1937. Her children inherited all of her estate.

== Charges and trials ==
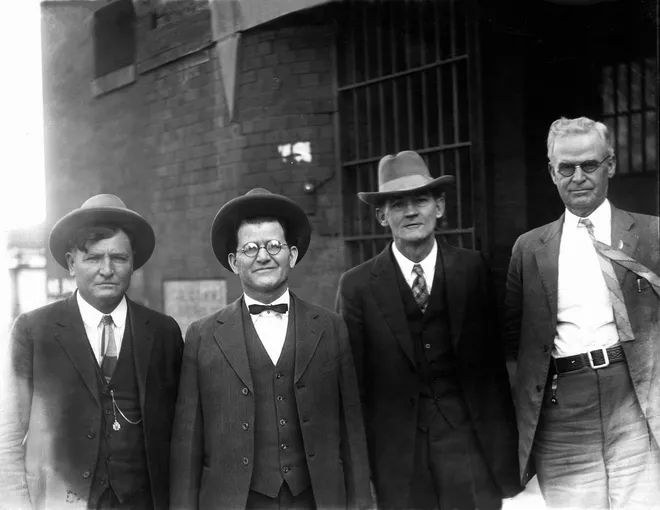
William Hale in 1926, second from the left, and John Ramsey, third from left, are flanked by two US Marshals.

Hale, his nephews, and one of the ranch hands they hired were charged with the murder of Mollie Kyle's family. Hale was charged with the murder of Roan, who had been killed on the Osage Reservation, making it a federal crime. Two of his accomplices, Henry Grammer and Asa Kirby, had died before the BOI investigation was completed. Hale and his associates were convicted in state and federal trials from 1926 to 1929, which had changes of venue, hung juries, appeals, and overturned verdicts. In 1926, Ernest pleaded guilty to being part of the conspiracy.

Several others were prosecuted for trying to impede the investigation. In 1927, a lawyer working in the interest of Hale, William Scheff, was convicted of furnishing whiskey for a witness in an attempt to get her to change her testimony. Scheff was sentenced to one year and one day in prison for federal liquor violations. In 1928, Reverend P. C. Hesser, a member of the grand jury which indicted Hale and Ramsey, was convicted of perjury for lying that Ramsey's confession had not been signed. He was sentenced to two years in prison and fined $100 (equivalent to $1,900 in 2025). In 1929, Irving Claude Hale, a half-brother of Hale, was sentenced to 60 days in prison for contempt of court. Theodore Cavalier, a local farmer, said Irving Hale had approached him and offered him money to sit on the jury and vote for an acquittal.

Various residents of Pawhuska petitioned Oklahoma Governor Jack C. Walton to conduct a full investigation of the deaths of George Bigheart and his attorney, William Vaughan. Walton assigned Herman Fox Davis to the investigation. Shortly after the assignment, Davis was convicted of bribery. Although Walton later pardoned Davis, the investigation of Bigheart and Vaughan was never completed. On November 9, 1923, Davis and three other men, Frank Brumley, Eustace Knight, and Tom Rudolph, robbed and murdered Paul J. McCarthy, a prominent attorney. All four men were found guilty or pleaded guilty to this murder, and were each sentenced to life in prison with hard labor.

In the case of the Smith murders, Ernest suddenly changed his plea to guilty, saying he wanted to tell the truth. He was sentenced to life in prison with hard labor. He turned state's evidence, naming his uncle as responsible for the murder conspiracy. Ernest said that he had used a person named Henry Grammer as a go-between to hire a professional criminal named Asa "Ace" Kirby to perform the killings.

Both Grammer and Kirby were killed before they could testify. Grammer, 39, died in a car crash on June 14, 1923. Kirby, 23, was killed while robbing a store on June 23, 1923. The shopkeeper had been tipped off in advance, and had been waiting for Kirby. It was later discovered that the man who had tipped off the shopkeeper about the upcoming robbery was Hale. After his parole, Hale's relatives said he once remarked, "If that damn Ernest had kept his mouth shut we'd be rich today."

John Ramsey confessed to participation in the murder of Roan as soon as he was arrested. He said that Hale had promised him five hundred dollars, equivalent to $9,400 in 2025, and a new car for killing Roan. Ramsey met Roan on a road outside the town of Fairfax, and they drank whiskey together. Then Ramsey shot Roan in the head. Ramsey changed his story, claiming that the actual killer was Curly Johnson. His accomplice, Byron Burkhart, had turned state's evidence.

The trials received national newspaper and magazine coverage. Sentenced to life imprisonment, Hale, Ramsey, and Ernest Burkhart later received parole despite protests from the Osage. Hale and Ramsey were both paroled in 1947. Hale died in 1962, and Byron died in 1985.

Ernest was paroled in 1937. In 1940, he and a woman named Clara Mae Goad robbed the Osage home of Lillie Morrell Burkhart, his former sister-in-law, stealing $7,000 in valuables, equivalent to $160,000 in 2025. In 1941, Ernest and Clara were both found guilty of federal burglary charges. Clara was sentenced to 5 years in prison. Ernest was sentenced to 7 years in prison and had his parole revoked. US District Judge Franklin Elmore Kennamer granted Ernest's request not to be sent to the USP Leavenworth, where Hale and Ramsey were serving their life sentences.

After completing his federal sentence at the United States Penitentiary in Atlanta, Burkhart was returned to the Oklahoma State Penitentiary to resume his life sentence. Ernest was paroled again in October 1959. During his parole hearing, he downplayed his own involvement in the murders, referring to himself as an "unwitting tool" of his uncle: "All I did was deliver a message. Other than that I'm as innocent as you. I delivered a message from my uncle to John Ramsey and that's all I did."

In 1966, Ernest applied for a pardon. Citing his cooperation with the investigation (White had credited his confession as vital for the convictions of Hale and Ramsey), the Oklahoma Parole Board voted 3–2 in favor of a pardon, which was granted by Governor Henry Bellmon. Ernest Burkhart died in 1986.

In the early 1990s, journalist Dennis McAuliffe of The Washington Post investigated the suspicious death of his grandmother, Sybil Beekman Bolton, an Osage with headrights who died in 1925 at age 21. As a youth he had been told she died of kidney disease, then as a suicide. His doubts arose from a variety of conflicting evidence. In his investigation, McAuliffe found that the BOI believed that the murders of several Osage women "had been committed or ordered by their husbands."

Most murders of the Osage during the early 1920s went unsolved. McAuliffe found that when Bolton was a minor, the court had appointed her white stepfather, attorney Arthur "A. T." Woodward, as her guardian. Woodward, who died in 1950, also served as the federally appointed Tribal Counsel, and he had guardianship of four other Osage charges, each of whom had died by 1923.

McAuliffe learned that his grandmother's murder had been covered up by a false death certificate. He came to believe that Woodward was responsible for her death. His book about his investigation, Bloodland: A Family Story of Oil, Greed and Murder on the Osage Reservation (1994), presents an account of the corruption and murders during this period.

Osage County officials sought revenge against Pyle for his role in bringing the murders to light. Fearing for his life, Pyle and his wife fled to Arizona, where he again served as an officer of the law. He died there in 1942.

== Change in law ==
To try to prevent further criminality and to protect the Osage, in 1925 Congress passed a law prohibiting non-Osage from inheriting headrights from Osage who had half or more Native American ancestry.

== Trust management lawsuit ==
The Department of Interior continued to manage the trust lands and pay fees to Osage with headrights. In 2000, the tribe filed a lawsuit against the department, alleging that federal government management of the trust assets had resulted in historical losses to its trust funds and interest income. This was after a major class-action suit had been filed against the departments of Interior and Treasury in 1996 by Elouise Cobell (Blackfeet) on behalf of other Native Americans, for similar reasons.

In 2011, the US government settled with the Osage for $380 million, $513 million in 2023 dollars. The settlement also strengthened management of the tribe's trust assets and improved communications between the Department of Interior and the tribe. The law firm representing the Osage said it was the largest trust settlement with one tribe in US history.

== Allegations of genocide ==
The events have been characterized as a genocide by some scholars who argue that the perpetrators intended to destroy the Osage Nation. While some scholars label the murders themselves as an instance of genocide, others describe them as part of a longer process of genocide against the Osage Nation. The 1910 United States census recorded 591 members of the Osage Nation who reported being full-blood Osage, 43% of the total Osage population. By the 1930 census, the number reporting as full-blood had fallen to 545, and their percentage as a proportion of the total Osage population had declined to 23%.

== In popular culture ==
- James Young Deer produced a silent film in 1926 called Tragedies of the Osage Hills that mentions the murders, considered a lost film.
- John Joseph Mathews (Osage), set his novel Sundown (1934) in the period of the murders.
- "The Osage Indian Murders", a dramatization of the case first broadcast on August 3, 1935, was the third episode of the radio series G-Men, created and produced by Phillips Lord with cooperation of the FBI.
- Western novelist Fred Grove, part Osage on his mother's side, was 10 years old when he was an "ear" witness to the bombing murders of Bill and Rita Smith and Nettie Brookshire. This incident haunted him. Several of his novels were based on aspects of the case: his first novel, Flame of the Osage (1958), two written in roughly the middle of his career: Warrior Road (1974) and Drums Without Warriors (1976), and one of his last, The Years of Fear (2002).
- The Kyle family murders were featured as a dramatic part of the 1959 film The FBI Story, starring James Stewart as fictional FBI agent Chip Hardesty, a composite character who leads the investigation.
- John Clinton Hunt, step-son of John Joseph Mathews (Osage), portrayed this period in his novel The Grey Horse Legacy (1968).
- Linda Hogan's Mean Spirit (1990) explores a fictional version of the murders.
- Dennis McAuliffe Jr.'s book The Deaths of Sybil Bolton (1994) was the first book to utilize the FBI files on the case for background research. It is an investigation into the death of the author's Osage grandmother who died during the murders. It was republished in 1999 with the title Bloodland: A Family Story of Oil, Greed and Murder on the Osage Reservation. The third edition, The Deaths of Sybil Bolton: Oil, Greed, and Murder on the Osage Reservation contains a foreword by David Grann.
- Charles Red Corn's novel A Pipe for February (2005) is set during the 1920s in the Osage Nation during the murders.
- Tom Holm's novel The Osage Rose (2008) is a fictionalized account of murders on Osage Territory intended to strip Osage members of their headrights and land.
- American journalist David Grann investigated the case for his 2017 non-fiction book Killers of the Flower Moon: The Osage Murders and the Birth of the FBI. The book was adapted by Martin Scorsese and Eric Roth for the 2023 film Killers of the Flower Moon
- American playwright David Blakely adapted Dennis McAuliffe's The Deaths of Sybil Bolton (1994) into the 2018 one-act Four Ways to Die and later the full-length play The Deaths of Sybil Bolton (2019).
- OETA's documentary series Back in Time debuted an episode on the murders in 2021 titled "Osage Murders — The Reign of Terror."

== See also ==
- Osage Nation § Natural resources and headrights
