= Mollie Kyle =

Osage woman (1886–1937)

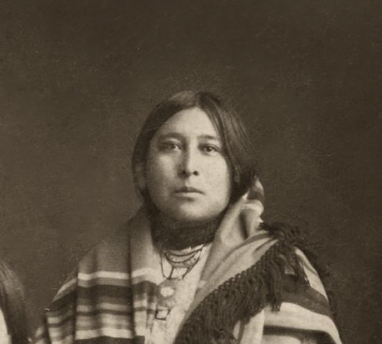
- Kyle in 1917
- Born: December 1, 1886; Osage Nation, Indian Territory
- Died: June 16, 1937 (aged 50); Osage County, Oklahoma, U.S.
- Citizenship: Osage Nation; American
- Known for: Survivor of Osage Indian murders
- Spouses: Henry Roan (m. 1902) Ernest Burkhart (m. 1917; div. 1926) John Cobb (m. 1928)
- Children: 3

Mollie Kyle (also known as Mollie Burkhart and Mollie Cobb; December 1, 1886 – June 16, 1937) was an Osage woman known for surviving the Osage Indian murders. She gained initial prominence in newspaper coverage during the trial of William King Hale and gained renewed prominence in the 21st century when she was portrayed by Lily Gladstone in the film Killers of the Flower Moon (2023).

Kyle was born in the Osage Nation in 1886 and attended Catholic school, eventually converting. She married Ernest Burkhart in 1917 and afterward most of her family was murdered in an inheritance scheme led by Burkhart's uncle. Kyle, a diabetic, survived a poisoning attempt on her life and divorced Ernest in 1926. She remarried in 1928 and died in 1937.

== Early life ==
Mollie Kyle was born on December 1, 1886, in the Osage Nation, Indian Territory (now Osage County, Oklahoma) to James Cue Kyle and Lizzie Q. Kyle. She grew up in Gray Horse and was forced to attend Catholic school in Pawhuska. She was Catholic and spoke both English and Osage. By the 1900s, Mollie was wealthy from her Osage headright, but deemed incompetent due to federal laws regulating Native Americans requiring her to have an appointed legal guardian. Kyle married Henry Roan when she was 15 in a traditional and arranged Osage marriage, but both were sent to boarding school shortly afterward and eventually married other people.

== Osage Indian Murders ==
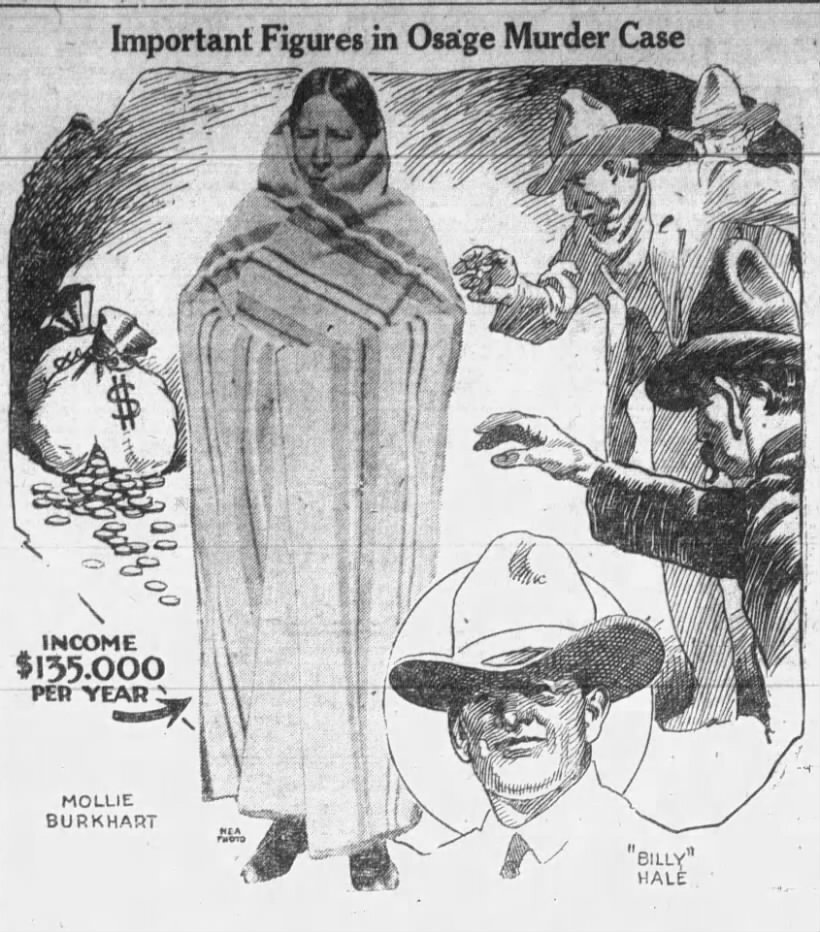
Political cartoon depicting Mollie Kyle and William King Hale from the Enid Morning News Sunday edition on February 7, 1926

In 1917, Mollie married Ernest Burkhart, a nephew of William King Hale. The couple had three children: Elizabeth, James, and Anna. Anna died of whooping cough as a child. After their marriage, Ernest and Hale conspired to kill Mollie's family in order to gain control of their Osage headrights in what would become the most famous of the Osage Indian murders.

In 1918 her sister, Minnie Smith, died of a "wasters illness" now believed to have been poisoning. Anna Brown, another sister, was shot and killed in May 1921. The next month her mother died. Another sister, Rita Smith, was killed in an explosion alongside her husband, Bill Smith, and housekeeper in 1923. Her ex-husband, Henry Roan, was killed the same year. Investigators eventually tied the deaths to Ernest and Hale and the pair were arrested. After her husband's arrest, she recovered from a "wasting illness", now widely believed to have been poisoning. She divorced Ernest in 1926 after he confessed to his role in the murders.

== Later life and death ==
She married John Cobb in 1928. In 1931, Mollie successfully sued to end her guardianship and gained control of her family's wealth. She died on June 16, 1937, and is buried at the Greyhorse Indian Village Cemetery in Osage County.

== In popular culture ==
Mollie is portrayed by Lily Gladstone in Martin Scorsese's 2023 film Killers of the Flower Moon, which focuses on the murders.
