= 2026 Oklahoma Attorney General election =

- November 3, 2026
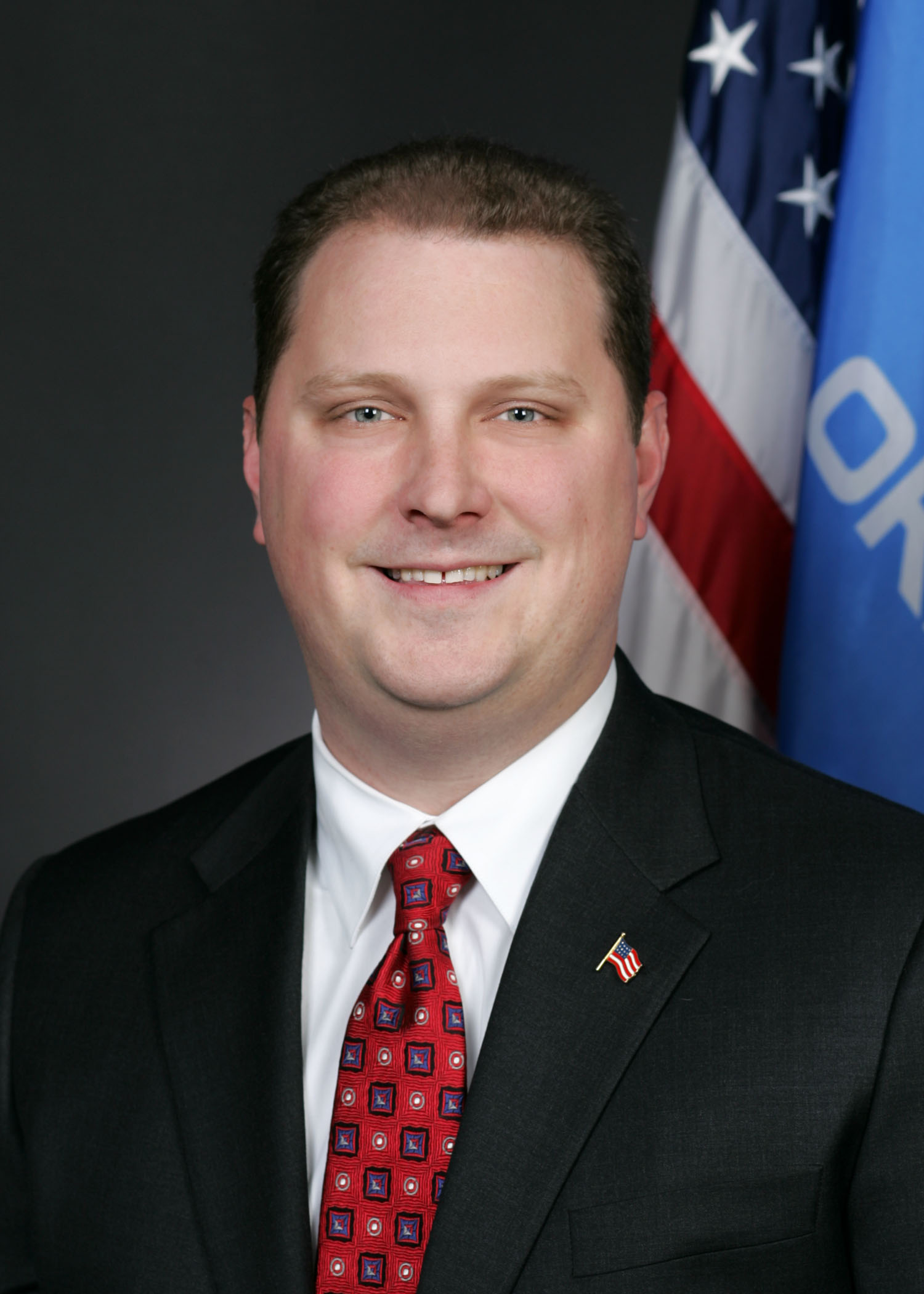

Nominee	Jon Echols	Nick Coffey
Party	Republican	Democratic
Popular vote	617,671	498,671
Percentage	55.3%	44.7%
- Echols: 50–60% 60–70% 70–80% 80–90% >90% Coffey: 50–60% 60–70% 70–80% 80–90% >90% Tie: 50% No votes
Attorney General before election
Gentner Drummond
Republican
Elected Attorney General
Jon Echols
Republican

The 2026 Oklahoma Attorney General election was held on November 3, 2026, to elect the Attorney General of Oklahoma. Incumbent Republican attorney general Gentner Drummond, who was elected in 2022 with 73.8% of the vote, declined to seek re-election and instead ran for governor.

== Republican primary ==
=== Candidates ===
==== Nominee ====
- Jon Echols, state representative from the 90th district (2012–2024)

==== Eliminated in primary ====
- Jeff Starling, Oklahoma Secretary of Energy and Environment (2024–present)

==== Withdrawn ====
- Chris Kannady, state representative from the 91st district (2014–present)

==== Declined ====
- Gentner Drummond, incumbent attorney general (2023–present) (ran for governor)

=== Endorsements ===
Jon Echols

State legislators

- Chris Banning, state representative from the 24th district (2022–present)
- Scott Fetgatter, state representative from the 16th district (2016–present)
- Ross Ford, state representative from the 76th district (2017–present)
- Kyle Hilbert, speaker of the House (2025–present) from the 29th district (2016–present)
- Emily Gise, state representative from the 90th district (2024–present)
- John Kane, state representative from the 11th district (2022–present)
- Mark Lawson, House majority leader (2025–present) from the 30th district (2016–present)
- Mark Lepak, state representative from the 9th district (2014–present)
- Chris Sneed, state representative from the 14th district (2018–present)
- Clay Staires, state representative from the 66th district (2022–present)

Local officials

- 17 county sheriffs

Individuals

- Jordan Sekulow, executive director of the American Center for Law & Justice

=== Polling ===
Poll source	Date(s) administered	Sample size (Note: Key: A – all adults RV – registered voters LV – likely voters V – unclear)	Margin of error	Jon Echols	Jeff Starling	Undecided
Cole Hargrave Snodgrass & Associates	January 26–30, 2026	600 (RV)	± 4.3%	35%	20%	45%

==== Debate ====
2026 Oklahoma Attorney General election Republican primary debate
No.	Date	Host	Moderator	Link	Republican	Republican
Key: P Participant A Absent N Not invited I Invited W Withdrawn						
Key: P Participant A Absent N Not invited I Invited W Withdrawn					Jon Echols	Jeff Starling
1	May 18, 2026	KWTV-DT; NonDoc	Haley Hetrick; Tres Savage	YouTube	P	P

=== Results ===
Primary results by county: Echols: 50–60%; 60–70%; Starling: 50–60%

Republican primary results
Party	Candidate	Votes	%
Republican	Jon Echols	207,832	55.0
Republican	Jeff Starling	170,061	45.0
Total votes		377,893	100.0

== Democratic primary ==
=== Candidates ===
==== Nominee ====
- Nick Coffey, former assistant U.S. Attorney for the Western District of Oklahoma

=== Endorsements ===
Nick Coffey

Individuals

- Gabe Ikard, former NFL player and radio host

== General election ==
=== Predictions ===
Source	Ranking	As of
Sabato's Crystal Ball	Safe R	August 21, 2025

=== Polling ===
Poll source	Date(s) administered	Sample size	Margin of error	Jon Echols(R)	Nick Coffey (D)	Undecided
CHS & Associates	August 3–6, 2026	500 (RV)	± 4.3%	52%	34%	14%

=== Results ===
2026 Oklahoma Attorney General election
Party	Candidate	Votes	%	±%
Republican	Jon Echols	617,671	55.33	−18.43
Democratic	Nick Coffey	498,671	44.67	N/A
Total votes		1,116,342	100.0	
Republican hold				

== See also ==
- 2026 Oklahoma elections
- 2026 United States attorney general elections
- Attorney General of Oklahoma
