= 2022 Oklahoma Attorney General election =

- November 8, 2022
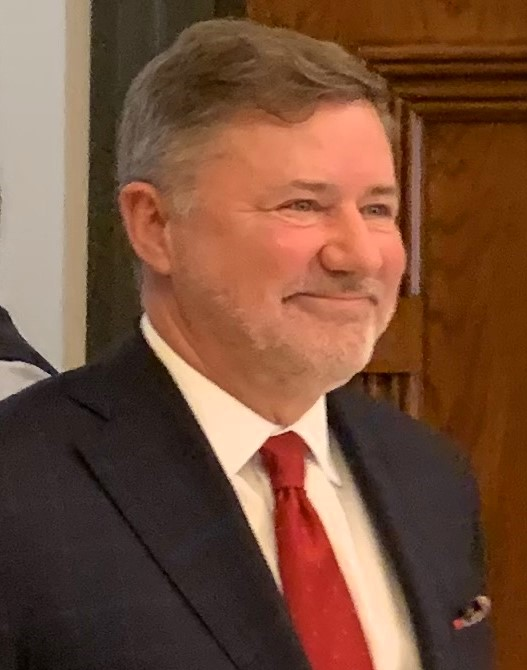

Nominee	Gentner Drummond	Lynda Steele
Party	Republican	Libertarian
Popular vote	792,466	281,923
Percentage	73.76%	26.24%
- Drummond: 50–60% 60–70% 70–80% 80–90% >90% Steele: 50–60% 60–70% 70–80% 80–90% >90% Tie: 50% No votes
Attorney General before election
John O'Connor
Republican
Elected Attorney General
Gentner Drummond
Republican

The 2022 Oklahoma Attorney General election took place on November 8, 2022, to elect the next attorney general of Oklahoma. The primary election was scheduled for Tuesday, June 28, 2022. The candidate filing deadline was April 15, 2022.

Appointed incumbent Republican Attorney General John O'Connor sought election to a full term, but lost his party's nomination to Gentner Drummond. No Democratic candidates filed to run for the position. Lynda Steele was the Libertarian nominee. Drummond won the November general election.

== Republican primary ==
John M. O'Connor was the incumbent attorney general after being appointed by Governor Kevin Stitt. The seat had been vacated after Michael J. Hunter resigned due to an infidelity scandal. Gentner Drummond, who had narrowly lost to Hunter in 2018, challenged O'Connor in the Republican primary. Drummond campaigned as being independent of Governor Stitt. The aftermath of McGirt v. Oklahoma was a dominant issue in the campaign. O'Connor argued that litigation to overturn or winnow the ruling in McGirt was warranted, whereas Drummond advocated compacting and negotiating with tribal nations. The candidates also differed in their opinions on whether Congress should disestablish certain reservations at issue, with Drummond opposing such action. During the June 16 Republican primary debate, O'Connor called Drummond a "Democrat in Republican clothing." O'Connor ran ads attacking Drummond for a donation of $1,000 by Drummond to the Joe Biden Presidential campaign in 2020 as well as Drummond's history of giving to Democratic candidates. Drummond claimed that the donation to Biden's campaign was made by his wife and provided receipts showing the donation was later refunded. The Tulsa World reported that Drummond's last donation to a non-Republican candidate for federal office was to Matt Silverstein's 2014 United States Senate campaign. In the final month of the primary, over $1 million in dark money was spent on ads opposing O'Connor's candidacy. Drummond defeated O'Connor in the primary with 50.9% of the vote.

=== Candidates ===
==== Nominee ====
- Gentner Drummond, attorney, former staffer for U.S. Senator David Boren, and candidate for attorney general in 2018

==== Eliminated in primary ====
- John O'Connor, appointed incumbent Attorney General of Oklahoma (2021–present)

=== Endorsements ===
John O'Connor

U.S. House Representatives

- Barry Goldwater Jr., U.S. Representative from California (1969–1983)

Statewide officials

- Ben Robinson, former Oklahoma Secretary of Military and Veterans Affairs
- Kevin Stitt, Governor of Oklahoma (2019–present)

County officials

- Damon Devereaux, Logan County sheriff
- Corey Rink, Garfield County sheriff
- Tim Turner, Haskell County sheriff
- Scott Walton, Rogers County sheriff
- Chris West, Canadian County sheriff

Individuals

- Jackson Lahmeyer, candidate for the Republican nomination in the 2022 United States Senate election in Oklahoma

Newspapers

- The Oklahoma City Sentinel
- Tulsa Beacon

Organizations

- American Conservative Union
- American Farmers and Ranchers
- National Right to Life Committee
- Oklahoma Cattlemen's Association
- Oklahoma Farm Bureau
- Oklahoma Second Amendment Association
- Oklahomans for Health & Parental Rights
- Susan B. Anthony List
Gentner Drummond

City officials

- Mick Cornett, former mayor of Oklahoma City
- Kirk Humphreys, former mayor of Oklahoma City

Newspapers

- Tulsa World

Organizations

- Oklahoma Fraternal Order of Police

=== Polling ===
Poll source	Date(s) administered	Sample size (Note: Key: A – all adults RV – registered voters LV – likely voters V – unclear)	Margin of error	Gentner Drummond	John M. O'Connor	Other	Undecided
SoonerPoll	June 13–21, 2022	350 (LV)	± 5.2%	47%	18%	–	35%
Amber Integrated (R)	June 6–9, 2022	400 (LV)	± 4.9%	41%	28%	–	30%
SoonerPoll	April 25 – May 11, 2022	306 (LV)	± 5.6%	41%	23%	–	36%
Amber Integrated (R)	March 24–27, 2022	455 (LV)	± 4.6%	37%	16%	–	47%
Amber Integrated (R)	December 15–19, 2021	253 (RV)	± 6.2%	16%	24%	4%	56%
Amber Integrated (R)	September 29 – October 3, 2021	253 (RV)	± 6.2%	16%	33%	8%	43%

=== Debate ===
2022 Republican primary debates
No.	Date	Host	Moderator	Link	Participants	
Key: P Participant A Absent N Non-invitee I Invitee W Withdrawn
Key: P Participant A Absent N Non-invitee I Invitee W Withdrawn					Gentner Drummond	John O'Connor
1	June 16, 2022	Nondoc/New 9/The Frontier	Tres Savage & Storme Jones	Debate	I	I

=== Results ===
Results by county Drummond: 50–60%; 60–70%; 70–80%; O'Connor: 50–60%

Republican primary results
Party	Candidate	Votes	%
Republican	Gentner Drummond	180,338	50.9
Republican	John O'Connor (incumbent)	174,125	49.1
Total votes		354,463	100.00

== General election ==
=== Candidates ===
- Gentner Drummond (Republican)
- Lynda Steele (Libertarian)

=== Predictions ===
Source	Ranking	As of
Sabato's Crystal Ball	Safe R	September 14, 2022
Elections Daily	Safe R	November 1, 2022

=== Polling ===
Poll source	Date(s) administered	Sample size	Margin of error	Gentner Drummond	Lynda Steele	Undecided
–(L) (Note: This poll was conducted in-house by and for Bruno's campaign)	September 15–18, 2022	2,989 (LV)	± 3.2%	52%	27%	21%

=== Results ===
2022 Oklahoma Attorney General election
Party	Candidate	Votes	%	±%
Republican	Gentner Drummond	792,466	73.76%	+9.73%
Libertarian	Lynda Steele	281,923	26.24%	N/A
Total votes		1,074,389	100.00%	
Turnout		1,074,389	46.80%	
Registered electors		2,295,906		
Republican hold				

==== By county ====
County	Getner Drummond Republican		Lynda Steele Libertarian	
County	#	%	#	%
Adair	4,102	83.02%	839	16.98%
Alfalfa	1,500	88.55%	194	11.45%
Atoka	3,271	87.27%	477	12.73%
Beaver	1,529	91.94%	134	8.06%
Beckham	4,598	86.58%	713	13.42%
Blaine	2,387	82.82%	495	17.18%
Bryan	9,040	83.63%	1,770	16.37%
Caddo	5,142	76.57%	1,573	23.43%
Canadian	35,823	75.22%	11,804	24.78%
Carter	10,227	80.72%	2,442	19.28%
Cherokee	8,932	70.75%	3,692	29.25%
Choctaw	3,320	86.21%	531	13.79%
Cimarron	671	94.11%	42	5.89%
Cleveland	54,671	65.58%	28,689	34.42%
Coal	1,559	85.94%	255	14.06%
Comanche	15,289	69.49%	6,714	30.51%
Cotton	1,531	85.96%	250	14.04%
Craig	3,455	80.54%	835	19.46%
Creek	17,356	81.67%	3,896	18.33%
Custer	5,863	80.99%	1,376	19.01%
Delaware	10,621	84.99%	1,876	15.01%
Dewey	1,540	88.97%	191	11.03%
Ellis	1,290	89.21%	156	10.79%
Garfield	12,761	82.14%	2,775	17.86%
Garvin	6,534	83.55%	1,305	16.65%
Grady	14,110	82.66%	2,960	17.34%
Grant	1,336	86.64%	206	13.36%
Greer	1,077	84.21%	202	15.79%
Harmon	536	88.16%	72	11.84%
Harper	1,014	89.34%	121	10.66%
Haskell	2,791	86.57%	433	13.43%
Hughes	2,780	82.44%	592	17.56%
Jackson	4,453	84.58%	812	15.42%
Jefferson	1,338	87.57%	190	12.43%
Johnston	2,446	85.76%	406	14.24%
Kay	9,376	78.91%	2,056	21.09%
Kingfisher	4,135	86.40%	651	13.60%
Kiowa	1,966	83.80%	380	16.20%
Latimer	2,460	84.45%	453	15.55%
LeFlore	9,850	85.24%	1,705	14.76%
Lincoln	8,887	83.27%	1,785	16.73%
Logan	12,788	79.07%	3,384	20.93%
Love	2,198	85.76%	365	14.24%
McClain	11,880	82.23%	2,567	17.77%
McCurtain	6,828	86.27%	1,087	13.73%
McIntosh	4,862	79.94%	1,220	20.06%
Major	2,381	90.12%	261	9.88%
Marshall	3,592	85.24%	622	14.76%
Mayes	9,842	81.69%	2,206	18.31%
Murray	3,334	82.69%	698	17.31%
Muskogee	12,422	74.41%	4,272	25.59%
Noble	2,962	80.36%	724	19.64%
Nowata	2,736	84.97%	484	15.03%
Okfuskee	2,195	79.88%	553	20.12%
Oklahoma	123,851	61.86%	76,353	38.14%
Okmulgee	7,471	75.35%	2,444	24.65%
Osage	10,555	74.49%	3,614	25.51%
Ottawa	5,818	81.14%	1,352	18.86%
Pawnee	3,945	81.51%	895	18.49%
Payne	14,502	71.02%	5,918	28.98%
Pittsburg	9,964	83.11%	2,025	16.89%
Pontotoc	8,077	76.94%	2,421	23.06%
Pottawatomie	14,966	76.49%	4,601	23.51%
Pushmataha	2,709	86.60%	419	13.40%
Roger Mills	1,148	89.41%	136	10.59%
Rogers	26,395	81.79%	5,878	18.21%
Seminole	4,313	77.64%	1,242	22.36%
Sequoyah	8,012	82.76%	1,669	17.24%
Stephens	10,747	85.08%	1,884	14.92%
Texas	3,127	87.32%	454	12.68%
Tillman	1,495	85.38%	256	14.62%
Tulsa	122,374	68.74%	55,646	31.26%
Wagoner	20,407	79.69%	5,200	20.31%
Washington	13,224	81.19%	3,063	18.81%
Washita	3,011	87.20%	442	12.80%
Woods	2,201	84.46%	405	15.54%
Woodward	4,567	87.29%	665	12.71%
Totals	792,466	73.76%	281,923	26.24%

== See also ==
- Oklahoma Attorney General

== Notes ==
Partisan clients
