= Pioneer Woman (disambiguation) =

The Pioneer Woman is a statue created by Bryant Baker in Ponca City, Oklahoma.

Pioneer Woman or Pioneer Women may also refer to:

- Pioneer Woman, a statue created by Leo Friedlander for Texas Woman's University, Denton, Texas
- Pioneer Woman (Littman), a statue in Portland, Oregon
- The Pioneer Woman (TV series), television series that airs on Food Network
  - Ree Drummond, chef and host of the series
- Pioneer Woman (film), a 1973 made-for-TV movie starring Joanna Pettet, William Shatner, and David Janssen
- Pioneer Women, memorial in Atlanta, Georgia
- Pioneer Women (TV series), a 1983 New Zealand television series
- "Pioneer Women", a 1952 episode of I Love Lucy
- Pioneer Women, the US branch of an international women's organization, renamed Na'amat in 1981

== See also ==
- Madonna of the Trail, a series of statues created by August Leimbach
- Pioneer Women's Memorial (disambiguation)
- Pioneer Women's Memorial Garden (disambiguation)
