= Drummond family (Oklahoma) =

American ranching family

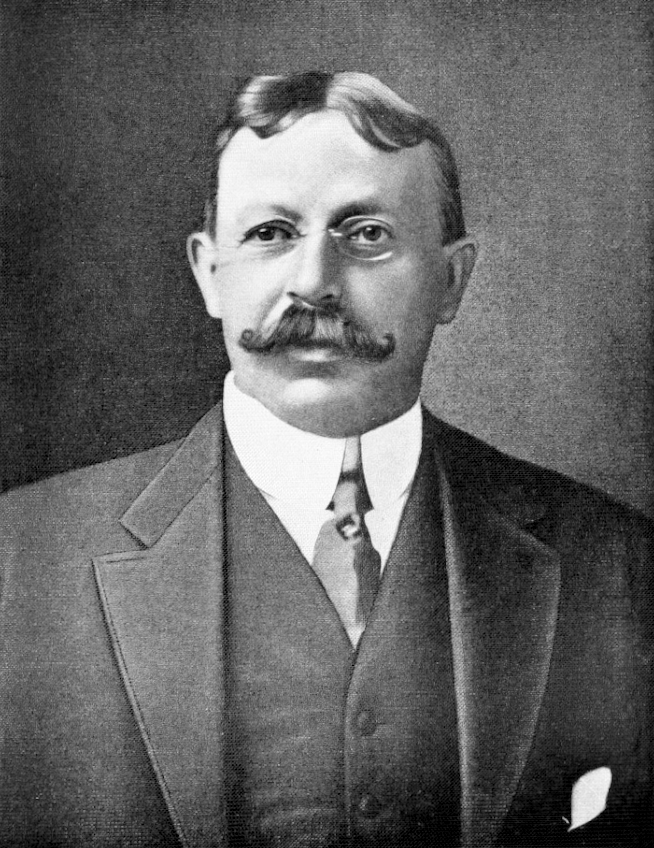
- Frederick Drummond, Scottish emigrant and founding patriarch of the Drummond family
- Current region: Osage Nation (1886–1890); Oklahoma Territory (1890–1907); Oklahoma (1907–present)
- Origin: Scotland
- Members: Gentner Drummond; Ree Drummond

The Drummond family is an American ranching family from Oklahoma. The family is one of the largest land-owning families in the state of Oklahoma and the United States. In 2017, the family owned 433,000 acres according to The Land Report magazine. In 2022, the family was the largest land-owning family in Osage County, owning about 9% of the county.

== 19th century: Settling among the Osage ==
The family's founding patriarch was Frederick Drummond (1864–1913) who moved to Osage County (then the Osage Nation in Indian Territory) in 1886. Frederick had emigrated to the United States from Scotland in 1882. He briefly lived in New York, Texas, and St. Louis before being hired as clerk for the Osage Mercantile Company in the Osage Nation. Frederick would marry his wife, Addie Gentner of Coffeyville, Kansas, on July 6, 1890. Fred and Addie had six children including three sons, Roy Cecil Drummond, Frederick Gentner Drummond, and Alfred Alexander "Jack" Drummond.

== 20th century: Osage controversies and increasing wealth ==
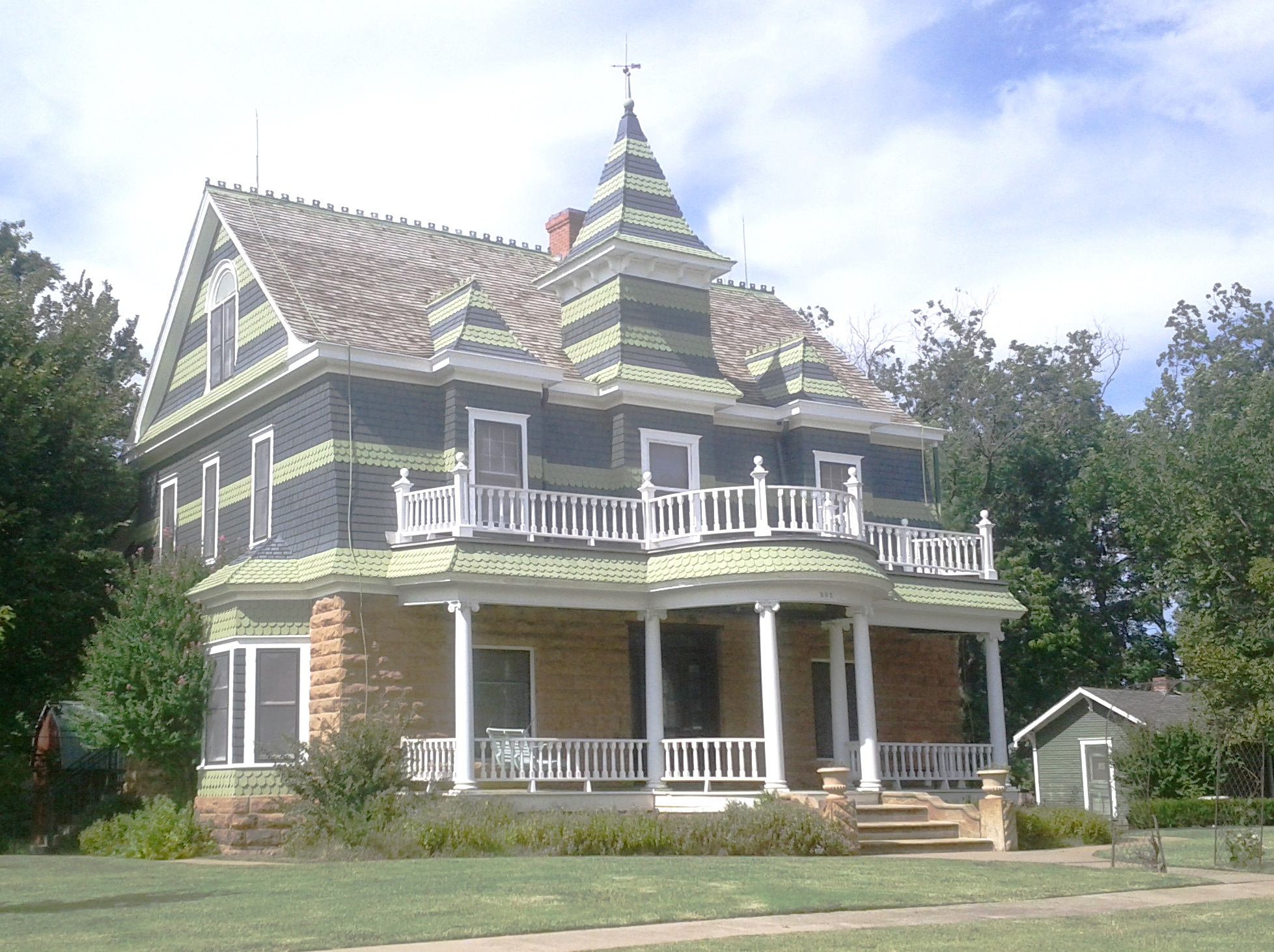
Fred and Adeline Drummond House in 2013

In 1903, the Drummonds moved to Hominy, Oklahoma, where Frederick founded the Hominy Trading Company. The Victorian-style Fred and Adeline Drummond House was built in 1905 in Hominy, Oklahoma, by Frederick and Addie. In 1908, Frederick Drummond became the first mayor of Hominy. Frederick and his son Frederick Gentner both spoke the Osage language. During the Reign of Terror in Osage County the Drummonds were creditors against and administrators for Osage estates. They also owned a funeral home that performed funerals for the deceased that would be paid for by the estate. Some families sold their allotments to the Drummonds to cover the costs of their debt to the Hominy Trading Company. In 1910, Fred G. Drummond was appointed Henry Roan's guardian and he purchased parts of Roan's land.

Frederick Drummond died in 1913, at which time he was claimed by his son Jack Drummond to own about 1,200 acres. After their father's death in 1913, Jack and Cecil Drummond founded Drummond Cattle Co., which over the next 50 years grew into a 200,000-head operation. Frederick Gentner Drummond took over running the Hominy Trading Company since he spoke Osage. Michael Snyder, a professor at Oklahoma State University, argues that the Drummond's various business meant "they were kind of pulling money from the Osage in a lot of different ways" and that the three brothers “definitely made a lot of money” acting as guardians. Terry Hammon, Jack Drummond's biographer, wrote "the Osage Indians became wealthy overnight, but their money passed through their fingers like water, and a lot of it drained into the Hominy Trading Company."

Jack worked at the store starting in about 1920 and overcharged Osage customers, saying "those shirts would cost us maybe $6 or $8 a shirt and I'd get $50 or $60 a shirt." Strained relationships with family members and neighbor resentment towards Jack Drummond as an Osage County "land hog" led him in 1924 to start buying land in the opposite part of the state in Marshall County, Oklahoma. In 1925, during the Reign of Terror in Osage County, Jack Drummond acquired one-half of an Osage headright for $20,050. He later acquired another one-fourth of a headright in 1928 for $11,250. He purchased the headright from O.V. Pope, a white rancher who had inherited one and a half headrights after his Osage wife Nah-me-tsa-he (who was thirty years his senior) died. In 1926, the Drummonds partnered with the Mullendores ranching family to buy William Hale's ranch.

In the 1930s Jack Drummond helped form a statewide cooperative marketing association so ranchers in the state could take advantage of government-backed loans. He was considered a leader of the livestock industry and was an innovator in herd improvement. Jack was a strong supporter of the Federal Land Bank. In 1934, Jack partnered with Henry Duncan to reopen the Sand Springs Packing Plant with support from a United States Department of Agriculture program to provide food for the Federal Emergency Relief Administration.

In 1941, Frederick Gentner, Cecil, and Jack were sued in the Northern District of Oklahoma for "conspir[ing] and devis[ing] a scheme to defraud." Judge Franklin Elmore Kennamer dismissed the case for lack of evidence.

The Drummond house was deeded to the Oklahoma Historical Society in 1980 and placed on the National Register of Historic Places in 1981.

== 21st century: Reality television and public office ==
In the 21st century, the Drummond family gained national attention due to the popularity of Ree Drummond's blog and television show The Pioneer Woman. The show brought tourism to Pawhuska, Oklahoma, where sales tax revenue increased by 30–50% after the opening of Ree Drummond's Mercantile store. The Drummonds donated for the creation of a new high school football stadium for Pawhuska High School and for the building of an animal shelter in town.

In 2017, the family owned 433,000-acre (175,000 ha) according to The Land Report magazine. In 2022, the family was the largest landowner in Osage County, owning about 9% of the county.

In 2022, two Drummond family members clashed with the Osage Nation over a Drummond-led plan to privatize a road near the Drummond Family Ranch: the Drummond group claimed that the road was used by people causing mischief and that Ree Drummond's celebrity was attracting too much traffic, whereas the Osage Nation argued the road was important for tribal citizens to access land owned by Osage Nation which is also on the road. The Osage County Board of Commissioners voted unanimously that the Drummonds' petition did not merit a hearing.

In 2023, Gentner Drummond became the Attorney General of Oklahoma.

== Family tree ==
- Frederick Drummond (1864–1913), m. Addie Gentner
  - Roy Cecil Drummond (1892–1981)
    - Frederick Alexander Drummond m. Ruth Thatcher
      - Charles "Chuck" Robert Drummond (March 12, 1943 – November 4, 2022) m. Nan Olsen
        - Todd Drummond, eldest brother of Ladd and Tim Drummond who died in a car accident at 18
        - Tim Drummond
        - Ladd Drummond (AKA "Marlboro Man") m. Ree Drummond, blogger, and media personality
          - Alex Drummond, daughter of Ladd and Ree Drummond
          - Bryce Drummond, son of Ladd and Ree Drummond
          - Paige Drummond, daughter of Ladd and Ree Drummond
          - Todd Drummond, son of Ladd and Ree Drummond
    - Gentner Drummond
      - Leslie Drummond m. Carol Ann Drummond
        - Gentner Drummond, m. Catherine Drummond (divorced); m. Wendy Drummond
          - Cate Drummond
          - Alexander Drummond
  - Frederick Gentner Drummond (1895–1958), m. Grace Ford
    - Frederick Ford Drummond (1931–2020)
      - Ford Drummond
  - Alfred Alexander "Jack" Drummond (1896–1989) m. Madeline Russell
    - Madeline Drummond (1921-)
    - Jim Drummond (adopted)

== Works cited ==
- Hammon, Terry (1982). Ranching from the Front Seat of a Buick: The Life of Oklahoma's A. A. Jack Drummond. Oklahoma Historical Society. ISBN 0-941498-57-3.
