= Frederick Drummond =

Oklahoma man (1846–1913)

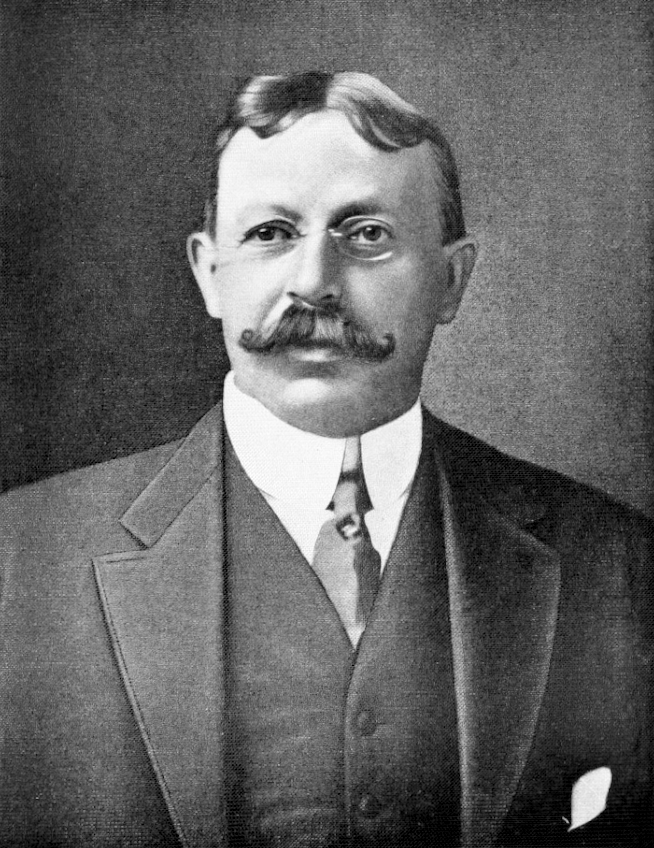

1st Mayor of Hominy, Oklahoma
- In office 1908–1910
- Preceded by: office established

Personal details
- Born: May 2, 1864 Ardrossan, Scotland
- Died: August 22, 1913 (aged 49) Stillwater, Oklahoma, U.S.
- Party: Republican
- Relatives: Gentner Drummond (great-great-grandson)
- Known for: Founding patriarch of the Drummond family; first mayor of Hominy, Oklahoma

Frederick Drummond (May 2, 1864 – August 22, 1913) was a Scottish-born American businessman and politician and the founding patriarch of the Oklahoma Drummond family.

== Early life ==
Frederick Drummond was born on May 2, 1864, in Ardrossan, Scotland, to Alexander Drummond and Henrietta Henry. His father was a lawyer and Frederick was one of 11 children. He immigrated to the United States from Scotland in 1882 and lived in New York. He moved to St. Louis in 1884 and to Pawhuska, Oklahoma (then part of the Osage Nation in Indian Territory) in 1887. During this time he obtained a license to trade on the Osage Nation and started ranching near Ponca City.

== Settlement in Hominy ==
In 1903, the Drummonds moved to Hominy, Oklahoma where Frederick founded the Hominy Trading Company after buying out the Price Mercantile Company. The Victorian-style Fred and Adeline Drummond House was built in 1905 in Hominy, Oklahoma by Frederick and Addie; the same year he became the first vice-president of Hominy's first national bank. He later operated a 3,000 acre ranch near Hominy with his son Cecil.

=== Political career ===
Prior to Oklahoma statehood, he was a founder of Hominy Public Schools and the first secretary of the school board in 1905. He was re-appointed to the school board for the following year. He was a county commissioner in 1907 before statehood. The last territorial governor, Frank Frantz, appointed him to attend the Trans-Mississippi Commercial Congress in 1907.

In 1908, Frederick Drummond became the first mayor of Hominy and served for two years. He was a Republican candidate for Osage County's 2nd county commissioner district in 1910, but he lost the election.

=== Osage Reign of Terror ===
Frederick and his son Frederick Gentner both spoke the Osage language. During the Reign of Terror in Osage County the Drummonds were creditors against and administrators for Osage estates. They also owned a funeral home that performed funerals for the deceased that would be paid for by the estate. Some families sold their allotments to the Drummonds to cover the costs of their debt to the Hominy Trading Company.

== Personal life and death ==
Frederick would marry his wife, Addie Gentner of Coffeyville, Kansas on July 6, 1890. Fred and Addie had six children including three sons, Roy Cecil Drummond, Frederick Gentner Drummond, and Alfred Alexander "Jack" Drummond. One of their children, Conrad Hubert Drummond, died as an infant in 1910 of pneumonia. He was sometimes referred to as "Colonel" Fred Drummond. Drummond was a member of the Freemasons and Presbyterian. Frederick Drummond died on August 22, 1913, in Stillwater, Oklahoma.
