= Pioneer Women's Memorial =

Pioneer Women's Memorial may refer to:

- Pioneer Women's Memorial (Sydney), memorial in Sydney, Australia
- Pioneer Women's Memorial (Perth), memorial in Perth, Australia
- Canterbury Pioneer Women's Memorial aka Pioneer Women's Memorial, memorial near Christchurch, New Zealand

== See also ==
- Category:Monuments and memorials to pioneer women
- Pioneer Woman (disambiguation)
- Pioneer Women's Memorial Garden (disambiguation)
