= Fred and Adeline Drummond House =

- U.S. National Register of Historic Places
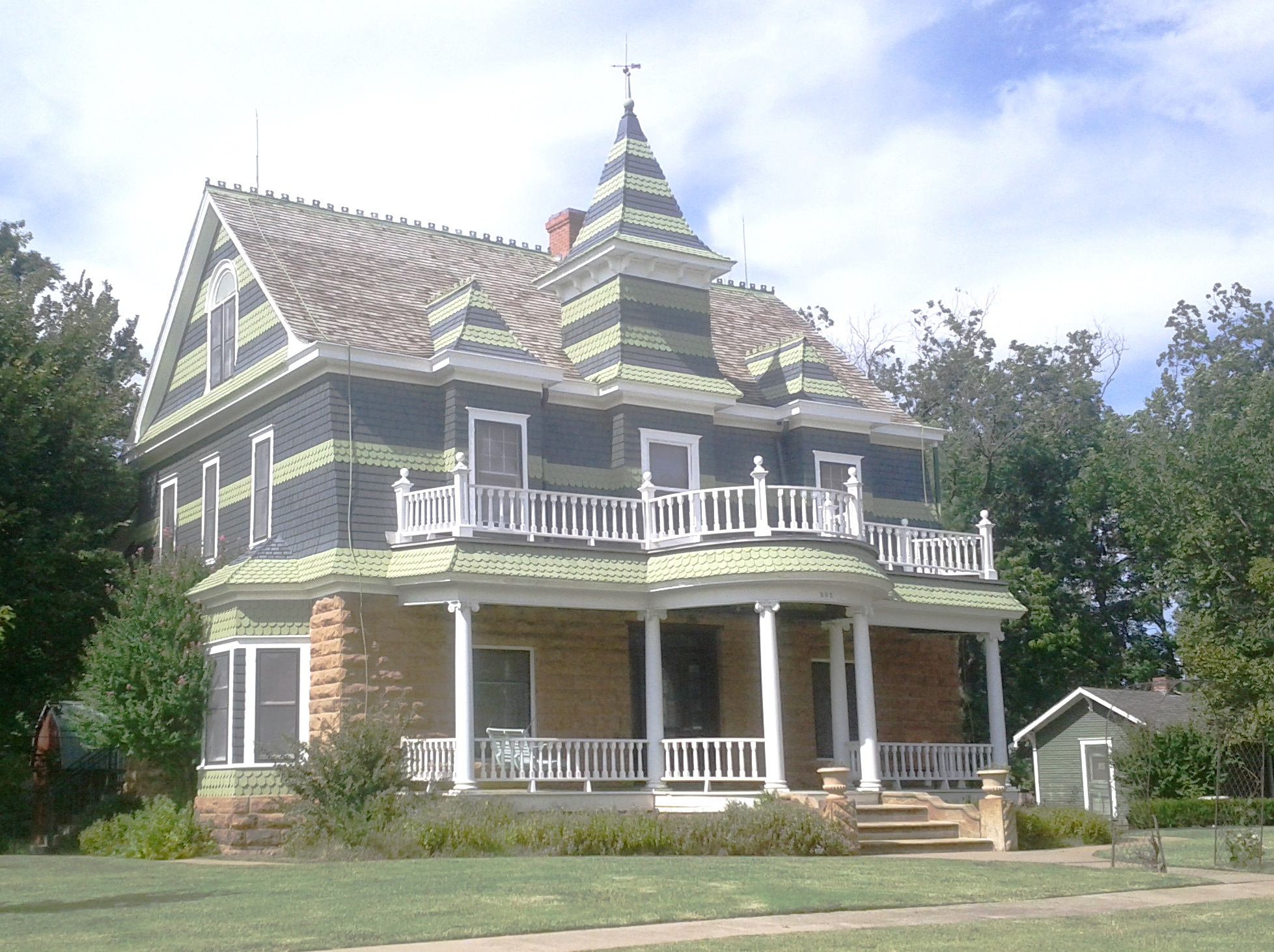
- Drummond home in 2013

- Location within Oklahoma
- Location: 305 N. Price Ave., Hominy, Oklahoma
- Coordinates: 36°25′04″N 96°23′39″W
- Area: less than one acre
- Built: 1905
- Architectural style: Shingle Style
- NRHP reference No.: 81000466
- Added to NRHP: April 16, 1981

The Fred and Adeline Drummond House is a home built in Hominy, Oklahoma in 1905 for Frederick Drummond and his wife Adeline Gentner. The home was given to the Oklahoma Historical Society in 1980 and added to the National Register of Historic Places in 1981. The listing included three contributing buildings, including the main house and a tiny home termed the "Moses House". The property is operated as a historic house museum by the Oklahoma Historical Society.

== History ==
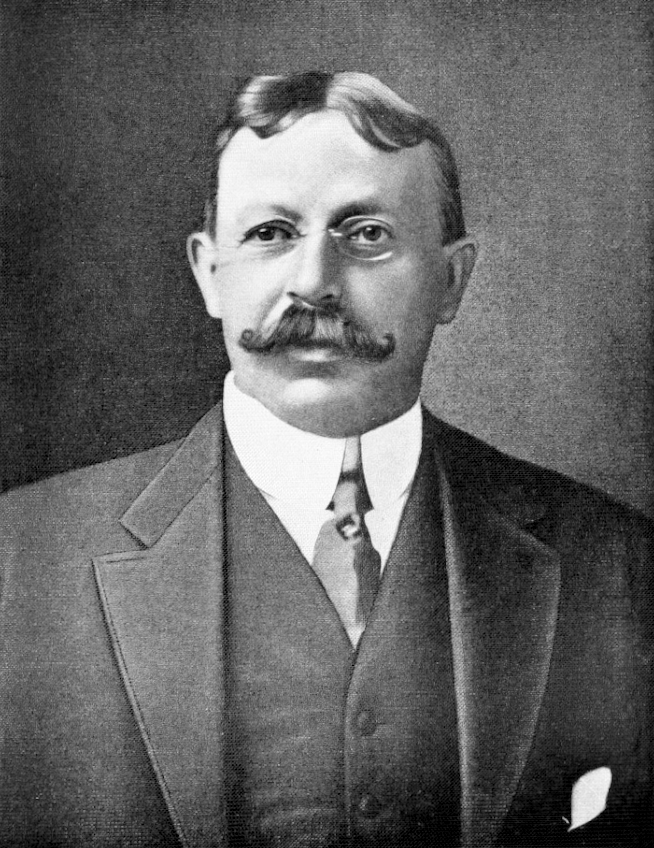
Frederick Drummond

Frederick Drummond, a Scottish emigrant, moved to the Osage Nation in 1886. There he met Adeline Gentner from Coffeyville, Kansas and they married in 1890. In 1903 they moved to Hominy, Oklahoma.

The house was constructed in 1905 and served as the home of Frederick Drummond and the Drummond family. The home was given to the Oklahoma Historical Society in 1980 and added to the National Register of Historic Places in 1981. The Oklahoma Historical Society operates the home as a historic house museum.

== Design ==
The house is built in a late Victorian style with a central square tower, balcony, and false dormers. It is the only residence in the Hominy area with the Victorian Shingle Style. The first story is made of sandstone and the upper floors are a wood frame covered with green painted shingles. The home was built with a basement that contained a gas-generating unit and water cistern that provided the home with running water.

The listing included three contributing buildings. Besides the main house, there is a 13 by 14 feet (4.0 m × 4.3 m) tiny home termed the "Moses House". This was home to a black man named Moses who did handyman work for the family.
