= Pawhuska Osages =

1922 American minor league baseball team

The Pawhuska Osages were a minor league baseball team that played in the Western Association for part of the 1922 season.

They were based in Pawhuska, Oklahoma and managed by Johnny Wuffli, Clyde Wren, and Otis Stucker; the latter two also played for the team.

The Osages replaced the Pawhuska Huskers, who played in the Western Association in 1920 and 1921. The Osages only played part of the 1922 season before folding on August 16.
