= Jon Echols =

American politician

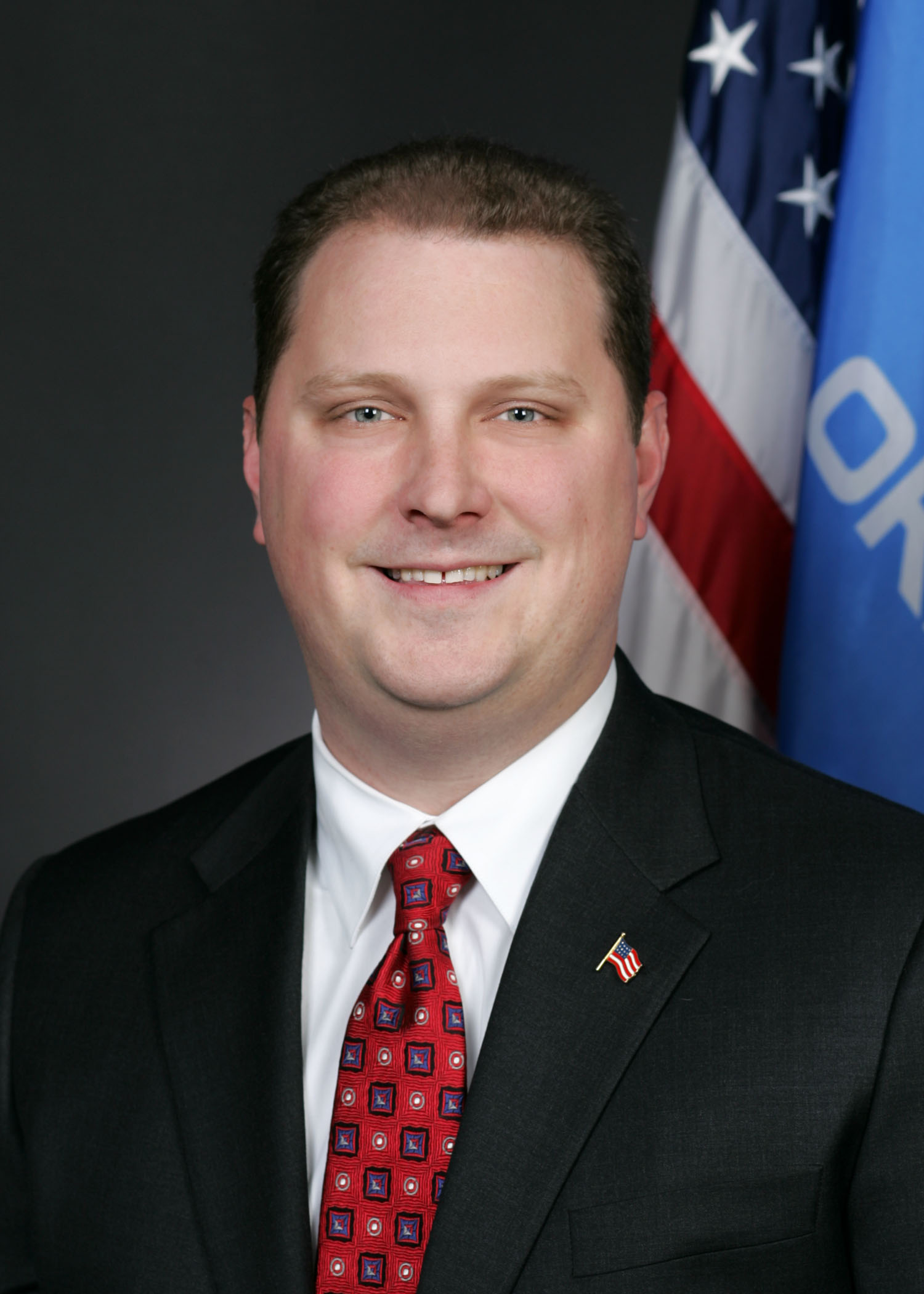
- Official portrait, 2013

Attorney General-elect of Oklahoma
- Assuming office January 2027
- Governor: Mike Mazzei (elect)
- Succeeding: Gentner Drummond

Member of the Oklahoma House of Representatives from the 90th district
- In office November 14, 2012 – November 20, 2024
- Preceded by: Charles Key
- Succeeded by: Emily Gise

Personal details
- Born: Jonathan David Echols; December 3, 1979 (age 46)
- Party: Republican
- Education: University of Oklahoma (BA); Oklahoma City University (JD)

Jonathan David Echols (born December 3, 1979) is an American lawyer and politician who is the Attorney General of Oklahoma-elect. He served in the Oklahoma House of Representatives representing the 90th district from 2012 to 2024.

== Early life, education, and career ==
Jon Echols was born on December 3, 1979, and grew up in Oklahoma City. His mother was an attorney and special education teacher, while his father, David Echols, is an attorney and a member of the Oklahoma City Community College Board of Regents. He graduated from the University of Oklahoma with a bachelor's degree in political science and graduated at the top of his class from Oklahoma City University School of Law with a Juris Doctor.

Echols co-founded Turn Key Health Clinics in 2009 and is the company's president. Echols has said that "he works for the company’s CEO mostly outside of Oklahoma to minimize perceived conflicts of interest."

Echols worked at the law firm Crowe and Dunlevy in Oklahoma City before joining his family’s law firm, Echols & Associates.

As a private attorney, Echols entered an appearance on behalf of the Oklahoma Republican Party in federal court to defend President Trump from an attempt to remove him from the Presidential ballot in Oklahoma in 2024.

== Oklahoma House of Representatives ==
Echols ran for the 90th district of the Oklahoma House of Representatives in 2012 to succeed Charles Key. He won the election and was reelected until he was term limited in 2024. From 2016 to 2024, he served as the majority floor leader of the house and he holds the record for longest serving majority leader.

=== Tenure ===
Echols received the 2015 Distinguished Service Award for Higher Education from the Oklahoma State Regents for Higher Education and the Council of College and University Presidents. He would go on to receive the award in 2020 and 2021 as well.

In 2016, Echols asked Sheriff Vic Regalado's office to change a bid requirement on a medical contract for the Tulsa County jail so his company, Turn Key Health Clinic, could bid. Echols said he asked for the change so that in-county companies would have a fair opportunity to make bids.

In 2019, Echols was the House author of House Bill 2597, also known as “Constitutional Carry,” and successfully led efforts to get it passed and signed. In 2019, as Floor Leader, Echols ran the bill on the House floor which created the Legislative Office of Fiscal Transparency (LOFT). LOFT provides oversight of state agencies to ensure that taxpayer dollars are spent wisely.

In 2023, Echols was the House author on Senate Bill 840 (co-authored by Sen. Greg McCortney, R-Ada), a bill that "deals with name, image, likeness — the new endorsements phenomenon known as NIL." Echols marked it as "high-priority." In 2023, as Floor Leader, Echols supported and ran legislation to ban transgender surgeries on minors in the state of Oklahoma.

In October 2023, Echols voiced support for Israel in the Gaza war, calling Hamas a terrorist organization and saying that Israel is in its rights to "wipe" Hamas out, but pointing out that Hamas is "not our Muslim brothers and sisters" and differentiating between Hamas and Palestinian civilians in Gaza.

In 2024, Echols introduced House Bill 4156, a state immigration law creating the crime of "impermissible occupation." Attorney General Gentner Drummond helped draft the bill.

In 2024, Echols was the House author to the Senate Bill co-authored by Greg Treat for the Oklahoma Survivors Act. Oklahoma was the first republican-led Southern state to pass survivor justice act legislation.

== 2026 attorney general campaign ==
On February 26, 2025, Echols officially launched a campaign for Attorney General of Oklahoma. He made an official announcement for his campaign in February 2025. He won the November election.

=== Controversy regarding ties to carceral health industry ===
During the 2026 attorney general campaign, controversy has arisen regarding Echols cofounding of and continued connections with private healthcare contractor TK Health that provides medical services at 143 Oklahoma jails as well as jails in several other states. The company faces numerous lawsuits alleging failure to provide adequate care, and there are concerns that if Echols were elected attorney general, his office would not properly investigate TK Health.

== Personal life ==
Jon and his wife, Kristen, have three children together. Jon and his family attend Capitol Hill Baptist Church in OKC.

Party political offices
Preceded by Gentner Drummond	Republican nominee for Attorney General of Oklahoma; 2026	Most recent
