= Randy Randleman =

American politician

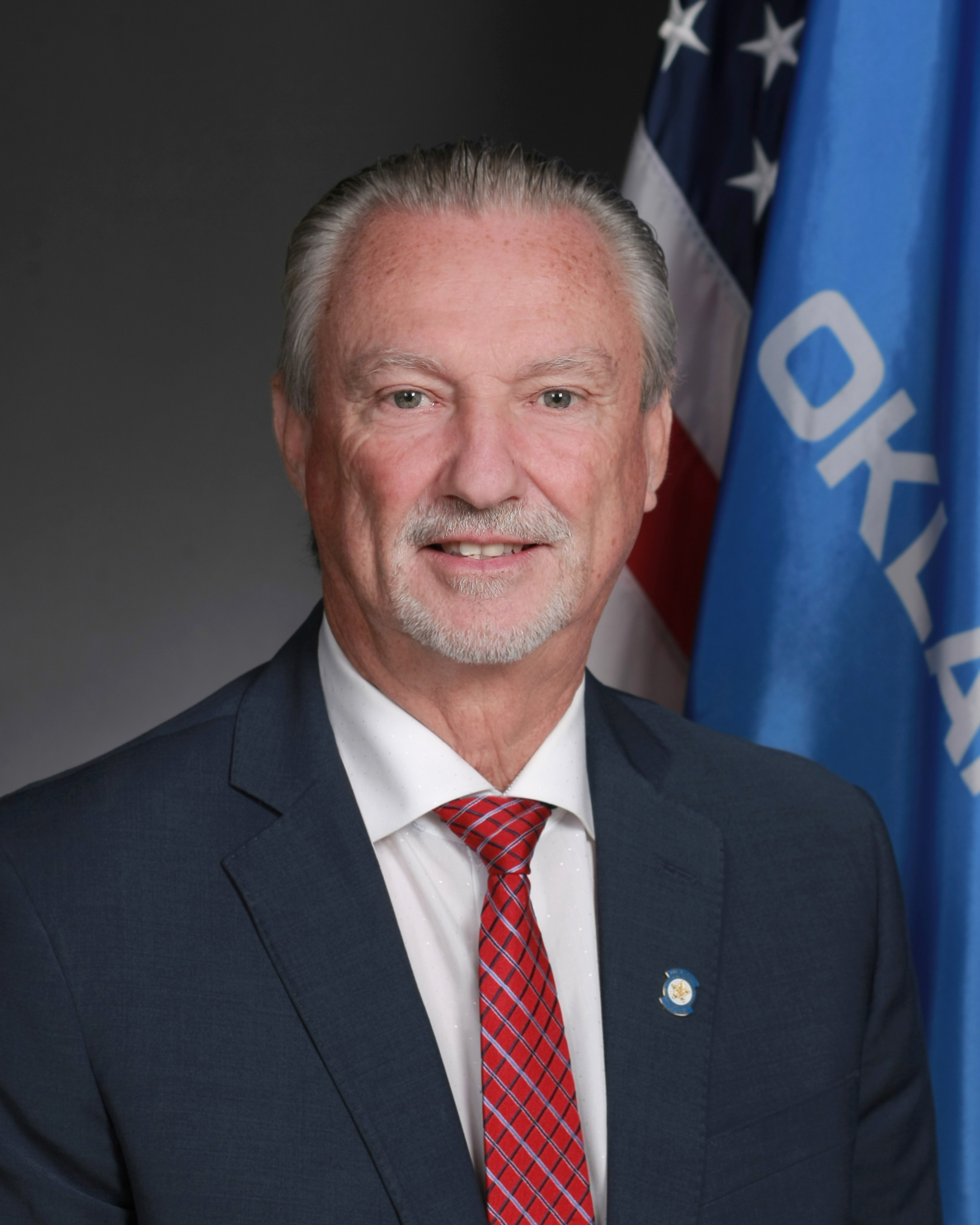

Member of the Oklahoma House of Representatives from the 15th district
- In office November 15, 2018 – November 20, 2024
- Preceded by: Ed Cannaday
- Succeeded by: Tim Turner

Personal details
- Born: January 25, 1954 (age 72)
- Party: Republican

Randy Randleman (born January 25, 1954) is an American politician who served in the Oklahoma House of Representatives representing the 15th district from 2018 to 2024.
