= Pioneer Women's Memorial Garden =

Pioneer Women's Memorial Garden may refer to:

- Pioneer Women's Memorial Garden (Adelaide)
- Pioneer Women's Memorial Garden (Melbourne)

== See also ==
- Pioneer Woman (disambiguation)
- Pioneer Women's Memorial (disambiguation)
