= Ed Cannaday =

American politician

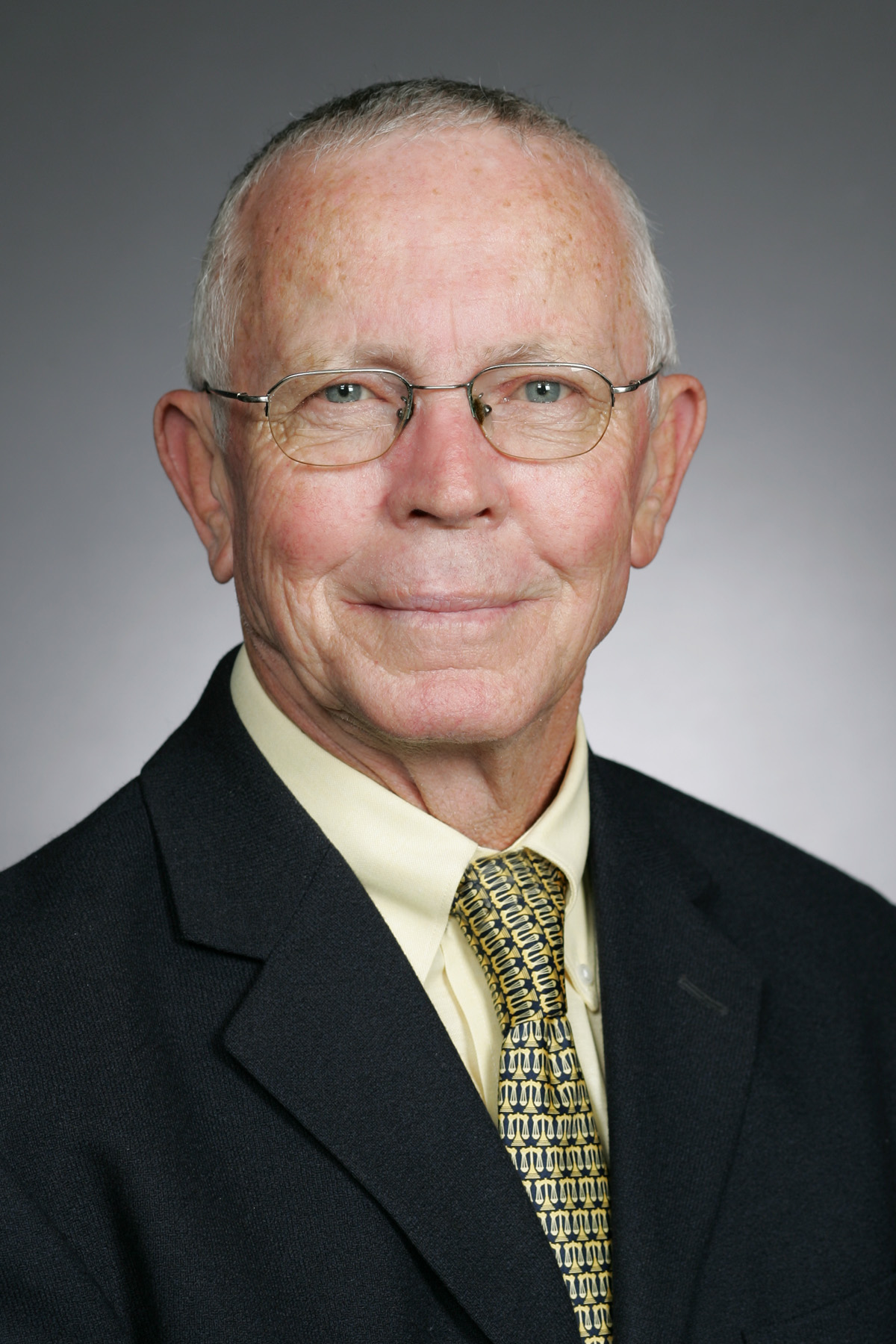
- Official portrait

Member of the Oklahoma House of Representatives from the 15th district
- In office November 16, 2006 – November 15, 2018
- Preceded by: Ray Miller
- Succeeded by: Randy Randleman

Personal details
- Born: October 31, 1940 (age 85) Radisson, Wisconsin
- Party: Democratic

Ed Cannaday (born October 31, 1940) is an American politician who served in the Oklahoma House of Representatives from the 15th district from 2006 to 2018.

== Biography ==
Cannaday was born in Radisson, Wisconsin. He served in the United States Army from 1959 to 1962, rising to the rank of sergeant. He earned his bachelor's and master's degrees in education and history from the University of Tulsa in 1968 and 1969, respectively. Additionally, he received an associate degree from Cameron University. Cannaday taught school in both Oklahoma and Wisconsin. He also owned a dairy farm and a meat processing plant in Porum, Oklahoma. From 1980 to 1988, he served on the Porum Board of Education.
