= Ray Miller (Oklahoma politician) =

American politician

Member of the Oklahoma House of Representatives from the 15th district
- In office November 2000 – November 2006
- Preceded by: Bobby Frame
- Succeeded by: Ed Cannaday

Personal details
- Born: February 5, 1950 (age 76) Quinton, Oklahoma, U.S.
- Party: Democratic Party
- Education: Oklahoma State University (MSEd)

Ray Miller is an American politician who served in the Oklahoma House of Representatives representing the 15th district from 2000 to 2006.

== Biography ==
Ray Miller was born on February 5, 1950, in Quinton, Oklahoma, and graduated from Oklahoma State University with a Master of Science in education in 1979. He previously worked as the director of the Kiamichi Technology Center. In 2000, he defeated Tim Pendley in the Democratic Party primary to represent the Oklahoma House of Representatives' 15th district. Since no non-Democratic candidates filed, he won the election to succeed Bobby Frame. He served in office until 2006. He is Baptist.
