= Emily Gise =

American politician

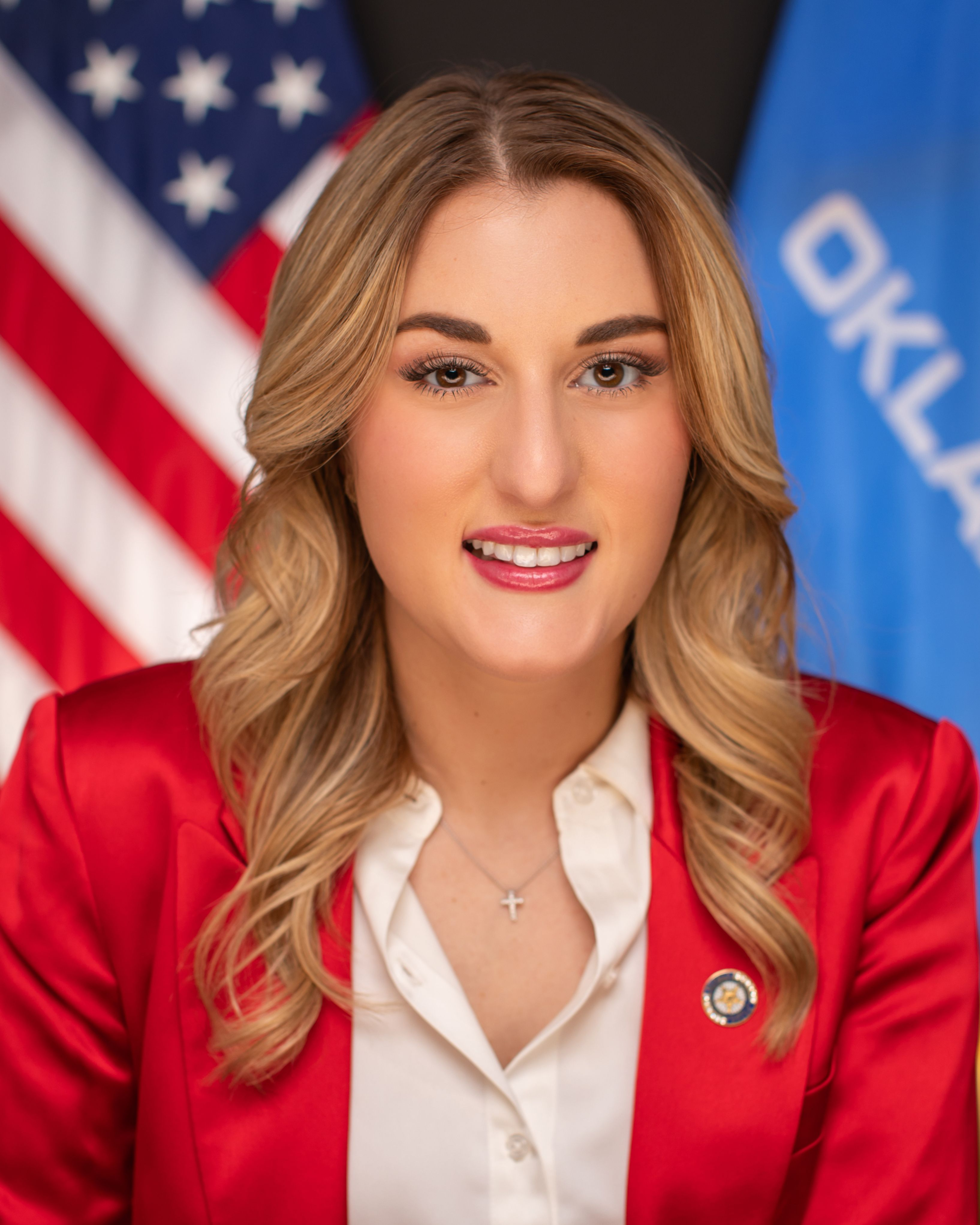
- Gise in 2024

Member of the Oklahoma House of Representatives from the 90th district
- Incumbent
- Assumed office November 20, 2024
- Preceded by: Jon Echols

Personal details
- Born: Tulsa, Oklahoma, U.S.
- Party: Republican
- Education: University of Oklahoma

Emily Gise is an American politician who has served in the Oklahoma House of Representatives representing the 90th district since 2024.

== Biography ==
Emily Gise was born in Tulsa, Oklahoma, and graduated from the University of Oklahoma. She worked for the Oklahoma Department of Human Services.

In 2024, Gise ran for the 90th district of the Oklahoma House of Representatives to succeed Jon Echols. She defeated Matt Echols, Jon's brother, in the Republican primary with over 53% of the vote. She defeated Democratic candidate Nana Dankwa in the general election with over 66% of the vote. She was sworn in on November 20, 2024.
