= Tim Turner (politician) =

American law enforcement officer and politician

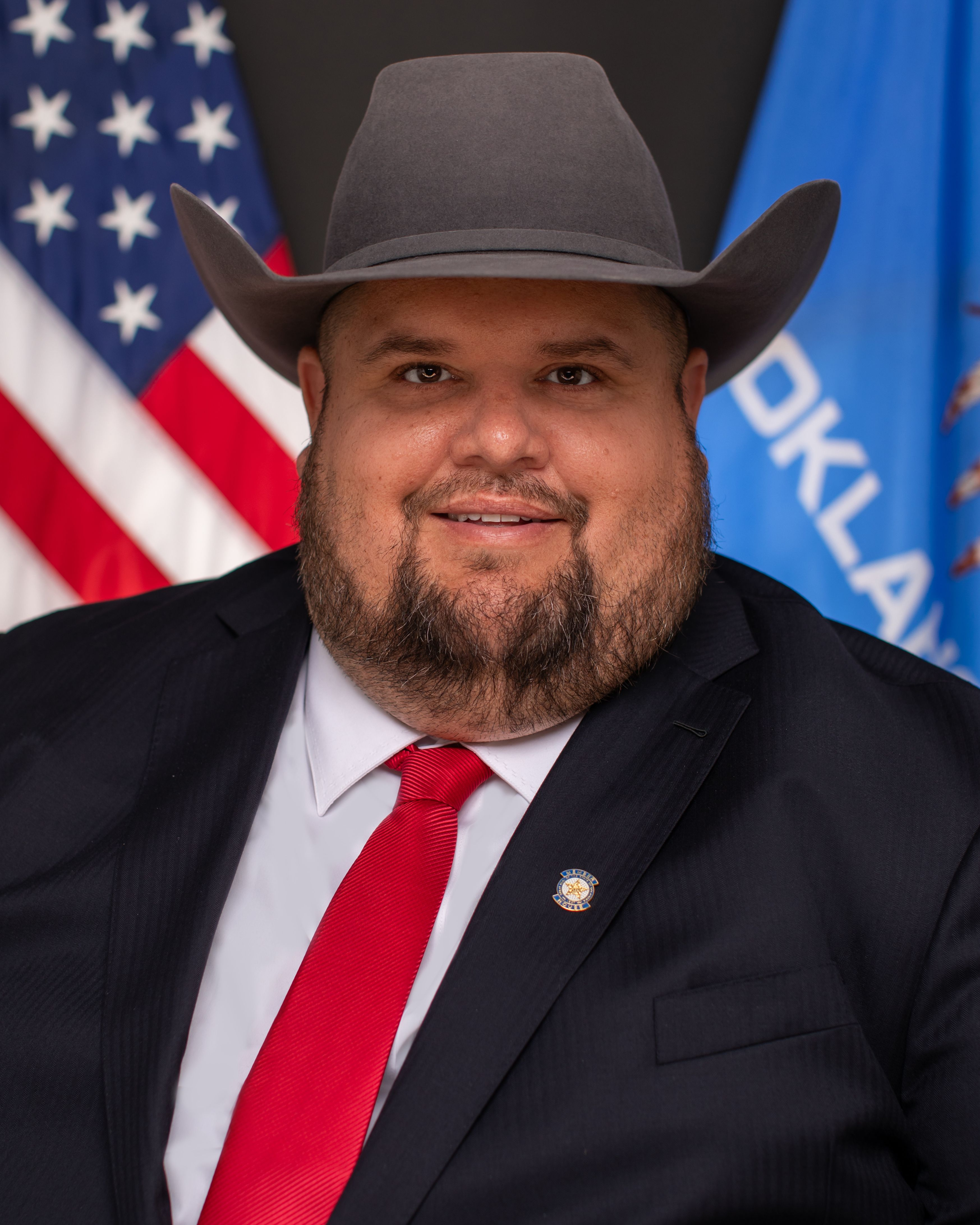
- Turner in 2024

Member of the Oklahoma House of Representatives from the 15th district
- Incumbent
- Assumed office November 20, 2024
- Preceded by: Randy Randleman

Haskell County Sheriff
- In office January 2017 – November 2022
- Preceded by: Brian Hale
- Succeeded by: Terry Garland

Personal details
- Party: Republican Party (since 2024)
- Other political affiliations: Democratic Party (before 2024)

Timothy Wayne Turner is an American politician and police officer who has represented the 15th district in the Oklahoma House of Representatives since November 2024. He previously served as Haskell County Sheriff.

== Early career ==
Tim Turner started his career as a 911 dispatcher in 2003, became a reserve deputy in 2005, and was a police chief from 2006 to 2007. He briefly worked as a deputy for the McIntosh County Sheriffs Department in 2007 before becoming a district attorney's taskforce officer with the United States Drug Enforcement Agency from 2007 until 2016.

== Haskell County Sheriff ==
Turner was elected Haskell County Sheriff in 2016 and re-elected in 2020 as a member of the Democratic Party, despite President Donald Trump carrying the county both years. While sheriff, he focused on stopping cattle rustling and closing illegal marijuana farms. In 2021 he was the Oklahoma Sheriffs Association's Sheriff of the Year. In March 2022, he was appointed to the Oklahoma State Bureau of Investigation Commission and in November 2022 he resigned as sheriff. After leaving the sheriff's office he worked for the Oklahoma Department of Corrections and later district attorney Jack Thorp.

== Oklahoma House ==
Turner ran for the Oklahoma House of Representatives 15th district in 2024 after incumbent Randy Randleman announced his retirement. He faced Gail Jackson, Casey Johnson, Spring Morrow, and Paul Palmer in the June Republican primary. He was endorsed by Choctaw Nation Chief Gary Batton and described himself as "conservative MAGA," opposing illegal immigration and COVID-19 vaccine mandates. He won the election outright with 52.64% of the vote.
