= Gentner Drummond =

American attorney and politician (born 1963)

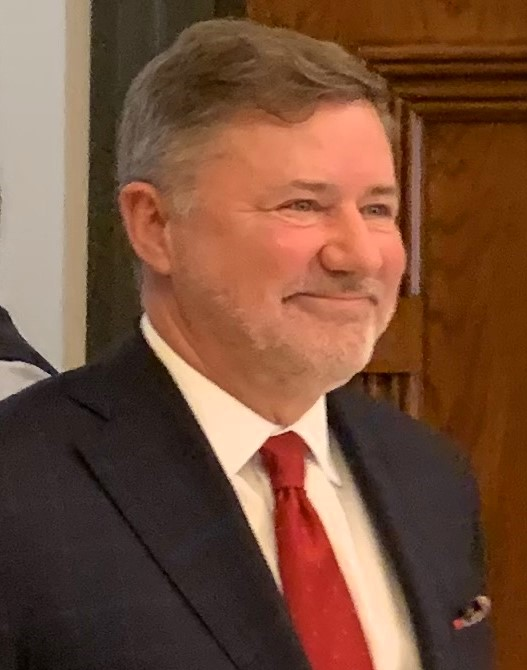
- Drummond in 2024

20th Attorney General of Oklahoma
- Incumbent
- Assumed office January 9, 2023
- Governor: Kevin Stitt
- Preceded by: John M. O'Connor

Personal details
- Born: Gentner Frederick Drummond; October 1, 1963 (age 63) Stillwater, Oklahoma, U.S.
- Party: Republican
- Spouse: Wendy Drummond (m. 2010)
- Children: 1
- Relatives: Drummond family
- Education: Oklahoma State University (BS); Georgetown University (JD)

Military service
- Branch/service: United States Air Force
- Years of service: 1985–1993
- Rank: Captain
- Battles/wars: Persian Gulf War; Air Campaign
- Awards: Distinguished Flying Cross

Gentner Frederick Drummond (born October 1, 1963) is an American attorney, businessman, rancher, politician, and former Air Force officer serving as the 20th attorney general of Oklahoma. He is a member of the Republican Party.

Born to the prominent Drummond family, he grew up in Hominy, Oklahoma, and graduated from Oklahoma State University in 1985 before joining the U.S. Air Force. He served in the Gulf War and left the military as a captain. He later worked as a staffer for Senator David Boren before returning to Oklahoma to practice law, also serving as an assistant district attorney in Pawnee and Osage counties. He later worked in banking and communications.

Drummond has built a reputation as a moderate Republican who often breaks with the party's right flank. He was elected in 2022 after narrowly defeating incumbent John M. O'Connor in the Republican primary, running as an independent Republican willing to oppose Governor Kevin Stitt and drawing support from some Democrats during his tenure. He has opposed religious charter school plans, slowed executions, and pushed reviews of high-profile convictions.

Drummond was a candidate for the Republican nomination for Governor of Oklahoma in the 2026 election. Despite coming in first place during the first round, he was narrowly defeated in the runoff by Trump endorsed candidate Mike Mazzei.

== Early life, education, and military career ==
Named after his great-great-grandmother, Gentner Frederick Drummond was born to Leslie and Carol Ann Drummond on October 1, 1963, in Stillwater, Oklahoma. He is part of the fifth-generation of Oklahoma's Drummond banking and ranching family. Drummond bought his first piece of land at age 14 and later graduated valedictorian from Hominy High School in Hominy, Oklahoma in 1981. He then attended Oklahoma State University–Stillwater, was a member of the Air Force ROTC, and received a bachelor's degree in agriculture economics in December 1984.

Drummond was commissioned in the United States Air Force in March 1985, served for eight years, reached the rank of captain, and flew F-15C Eagles. During the Gulf War, he took part in the first combat mission of Operation Desert Storm on January 17, 1991, and was one of the first three pilots interviewed by pool reporters after the mission. Drummond said during the war he ignored orders to shoot down an unidentified plane and was arrested by military police. The plane was later identified as a "Saudi Arabian prince" and Drummond was released with commendations. He earned a Distinguished Flying Cross for "superb situational awareness, airmanship and understanding of the established rules of engagement", three Air Medals, and four Aerial Achievement Medals during his service. Drummond completed 32 missions with 190 hours of flight time during the conflict.

After his military service, Drummond then worked as a staffer for U.S. Senator David Boren, the last Democratic senator from Oklahoma, between 1993 and 1994. He then attended the night program at the Georgetown University Law Center where he earned a Juris Doctor degree in 1995.

== Business and legal career ==
After returning to Oklahoma in the early 1990s, Drummond worked for the law firm Boone, Smith, Davis, Hurst and Dickman in Tulsa, Oklahoma, as well as serving as an assistant district attorney for Pawnee and Osage Counties. Drummond later founded Drummond Law, a law firm focused on banking law with his second wife Wendy Drummond. Drummond's legal ethics have attracted criticism from jurors, former clients, opposing counsel and their clients, and The Oklahoman, including in connection with his representation of other Drummond family members and a bank. Drummond is also a principal owner of Blue Sky Bank (formerly Citizens Bank of Oklahoma, NBC Bank, and the National Bank of Commerce), as well as Drummond Communications, a store agency for U.S. Cellular under the trade name Premier Locations. He also owns the 1,100-acre (450 ha) event location Post Oak Lodge. He also operates a 25,000-acre (10,000 ha) ranch near Pawhuska, Oklahoma.

In 2019, the United States federal government sued Drummond, two of his businesses (Drummond Ranch LLC and Drummond Cattle LLC), and Regier Flying Service (which he had engaged) for allegedly spreading herbicide that killed more than 40,000 trees on United States Army Corps of Engineers land near Skiatook Lake and Birch Lake. However, the case was later settled and dismissed without prejudice after Regier Flying Service agreed to pay a $240,000 settlement. Drummond defended spraying the herbicide saying the federal government's position was "contrary to wildlife management and natural range development" and the public lands in question had been "formerly ours."

During the COVID-19 pandemic, Drummond's cattle ranch, US Cellular stores, and law firm received $3.6 million in Paycheck Protection Program funds over the course of two years; in the second year, the three businesses applied for and were approved for their loans from Blue Sky Bank, a bank which is also owned by Drummond.

== Political aspirations ==
In a 2013 interview before running for office, Drummond described his politics as aligning with the "business class ... which translates to mean that there is a little Republican and a little Democrat in everyone" and noted the importance of the Democratic Party in helping Oklahoma in the 1920s and 1930s, and he also noted the prosperity brought by the Republican Party in the 1980s and 1990s.

=== Political donations ===
Drummond's prior political donations have been a topic of criticism during his Republican primary campaigns. The Tulsa World reported Drummond donated over $80,000 to state candidates in Oklahoma from 2016 to 2025, with a donation to John Waldron in 2017 appearing to be his last donation to a Democratic candidate. In federal races, Drummond donated $147,750 to candidates for federal offices between 1999 and 2025, as well as $70,000 to a committee associated with President Donald Trump and $38,400 to the Republican National Committee.

During his 2022 campaign for attorney general, John M. O'Connor ran ads attacking Drummond for a donation of $1,000 by Drummond to the Joe Biden Presidential campaign in 2020 as well as Drummond's history of giving to Democratic candidates. Drummond claimed that the donation to Biden's campaign was made by his wife and provided receipts showing the donation was later refunded. The Tulsa World reported that Drummond's last donation to a non-Republican candidate for federal office was to Matt Silverstein's 2014 United States Senate campaign.

During his 2026 campaign for governor, Charles McCall criticized Drummond for a 2017 donation of $500 to the recently elected chair of the Oklahoma Democratic Party, John Waldron, during Waldron's first state house campaign.

=== 2018 Attorney General campaign ===
Drummond ran for Attorney General of Oklahoma as a Republican in the 2018 election. Michael J. Hunter led the first round with 44.5 percent of the vote while Drummond finished in second with 38.5 percent, with both advancing to a runoff election. Hunter defeated Drummond in the runoff by 271 votes. Drummond campaigned as a reform-oriented political outsider with more experience, maintaining that Hunter had never tried a case. Drummond attacked Hunter as a "career lobbyist" who was overly reliant on outside counsel and challenged Hunter's residency in Oklahoma, while Hunter characterized Drummond as dishonest and unethical. During the race, controversies from Drummond's legal career provided fodder for news coverage.

Oklahoma Senator James Lankford, Congressman Tom Cole, and Oklahoma City Mayor David Holt criticized Drummond's campaign for an ad claiming that Hunter supported jobs for illegal immigrants and that such support led to the murder of Mollie Tibbetts. Tibbetts's family denounced the campaign ad as racist and an attempt to politicize the murder.

== Attorney General of Oklahoma ==
=== 2022 Attorney General campaign ===
Drummond ran for attorney general again in the 2022 election, despite speculation he may instead run for Oklahoma's open senate seat. In the primary, Drummond faced incumbent John M. O'Connor and at the outset Drummond announced he would be willing to spend another $2,000,000 of his own money to support his second bid. He campaigned as a candidate independent of Governor Kevin Stitt, who had appointed O'Connor after Michael J. Hunter's resignation. The aftermath of McGirt v. Oklahoma was a dominant issue in the campaign: both candidates criticized the ruling, but O'Connor argued that litigation to overturn or winnow the ruling in McGirt was warranted, whereas Drummond championed a less litigious approach (the candidates also differed in their opinions on whether Congress should disestablish certain reservations at issue, with Drummond opposing such action). During the June 16 Republican primary debate, O'Connor called Drummond a "Democrat in Republican clothing." In the final month of the primary, Drummond's campaign benefited from over $1 million in dark money spending on ads opposing O'Connor's candidacy in the final month of the race. During the primary campaign, Drummond met with Osage Nation Chief Geoffrey Standing Bear and Standing Bear offered to support his candidacy if he promised to never bring a case affecting the Osage Mineral estate. Drummond refused and his campaign was not supported by the Osage Nation.

Drummond defeated O'Connor in a close Republican primary election, winning 180,338 votes compared to O’Connor's 174,125 (less than 1.8% of votes cast). As no Democrats filed to run for attorney general, Drummond faced Libertarian Lynda Steele in the November general election. He defeated Steele with 74% of the vote, the largest election win for a statewide candidate that year in Oklahoma. (Note: The Tulsa World rounded up Drummonds 73.8% to 74% in their reporting.)

=== Tenure ===
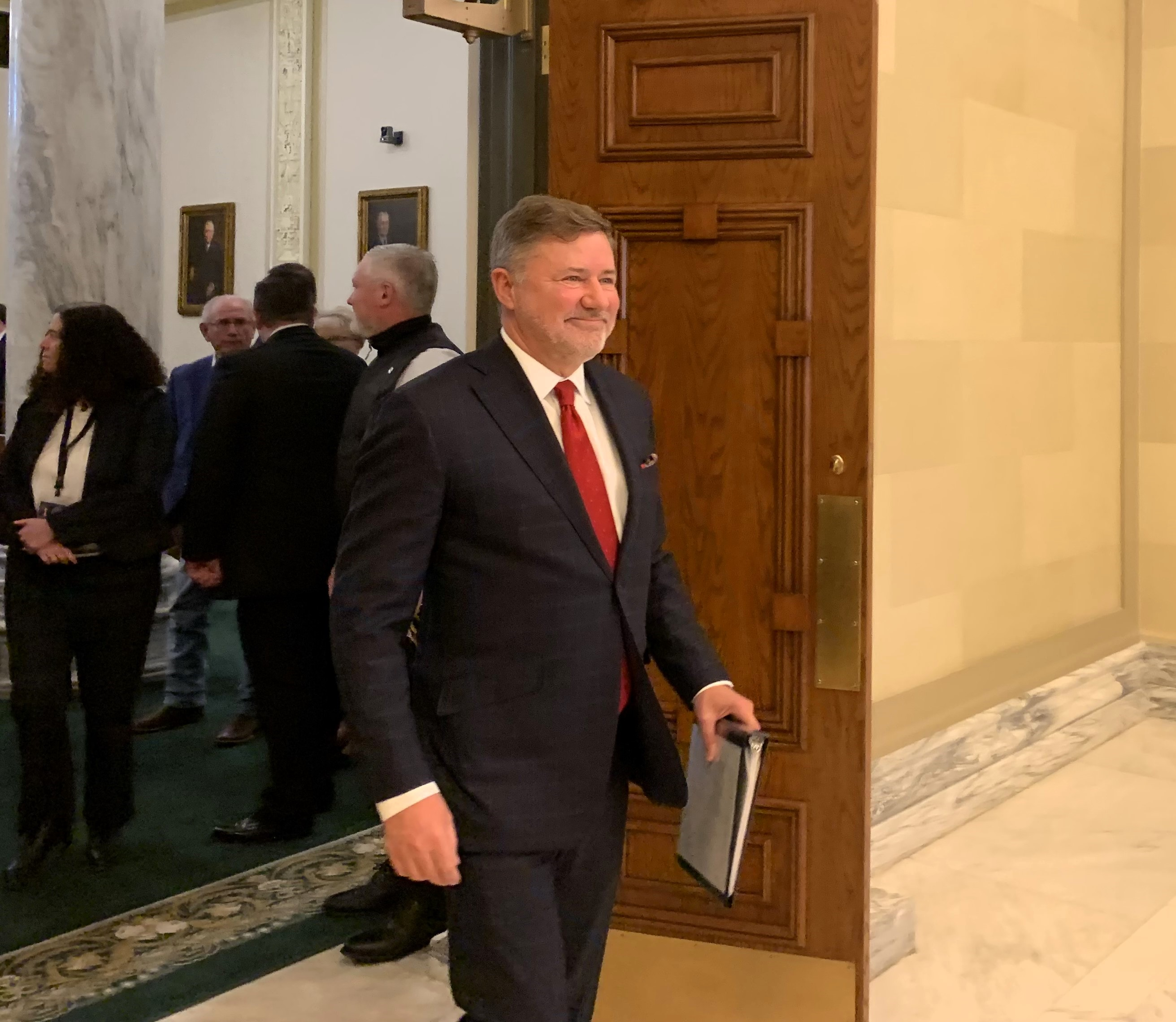
Drummond leaving the Oklahoma Supreme Court's chamber in the Oklahoma State Capitol after oral arguments for Drummond v. Oklahoma Statewide Virtual Charter School Board on April 2, 2024.

In January 2023, Drummond announced one of his early priorities in office would be to investigate the misuse of COVID-19 relief funds. That month, the attorney general's office took over the Swadley's Bar-B-Q investigation, the prosecution of the founders of Epic Charter Schools, and an investigation into the Oklahoma Commissioners of the Land Office. On the last day of January, his office dropped the case against Classwallet filed by former attorney general John M. O'Connor for mishandling parts of a $31 million federal education grant.

The next month his office took control of the corruption case against Terry O'Donnell from the newly elected Oklahoma County district attorney Vicki Behenna's office; his office later dismissed the charges against O'Donnell saying he was "guilty," but wrongly targeted for prosecution. He was cited as wanting to fill the "role of bridge-builder between the state and Oklahoma's Native American tribes, a responsibility no attorney general has attempted to take on since the relationship between Stitt and tribal leaders first began to sour in 2019."

In 2023, Drummond supported resentencing efforts for domestic violence victims like April Wilkens. He said he "grew up in the Osage" and was exposed to "battery and violence" in that community, saying that it is not an ethnic issue but one that affects everyone.

He is a member of the Oklahoma District Attorney's Council. However, he has had criticism from the council's members. District Attorney Jason Hicks criticized Drummond for sharing his views on Richard Glossip’s clemency case. In other communications revealed, district attorneys referred to Drummond as a “douche” and "complained among themselves that the attorney general had turned Glossip’s clemency hearing into a 'circus'" and accused Drummond of vying for a run for governor.

In December 2024, Gentner dismissed excessive force charges filed against Oklahoma City Police Department sergeant Joseph Gibson by Oklahoma County District Attorney Vicki Behenna. Gibson was charged after body camera footage showed him throw a 71-year-old man to the floor causing his hospitalization for a brain bleed as well as face and spine fractures. The injured 71-year-old is a member of Oklahoma City's Vietnamese American community and community leaders objected to the dismissal of charges. The Oklahoma Fraternal Order of Police was later the first endorsement of Drummond's 2026 Oklahoma gubernatorial campaign.

In August 2025, Drummond took over the prosecution of State Representative Ty Burns after Burns was charged with domestic assault and assault involving family members. Burns’s offending included an incident in November 2024 in which he tried to gouge his wife’s eye, as well as in April 2025 attempting to run his daughter’s vehicle off the road with a minor passenger. Burns pleaded guilty to one misdemeanor count of domestic abuse and two misdemeanor counts of assault and received a one-year suspended sentence. The plea-deal drew sharp public criticism because the charges were reduced to misdemeanors despite serious allegations, raising concerns about prosecutorial leniency and the integrity of equal treatment under his watch.

In 2026, Drummond filed lawsuits against Allstate and State Farm, alleging that the companies established racketeering schemes to systematically deny and underpay home insurance policyholders whose roofs were damaged during severe storms.

In May 2026, Drummond filed a lawsuit against Roblox, alleging that Roblox had consistently placed corporate profits over the safety of its underage users. Drummond stated that the platform had been allowed to become a "hunting ground for child predators." Drummond joined a list of 10 other state attorney's general, alongside several local county and municipal governments in suing the platform over online safety concerns.

==== Capital punishment ====
Drummond attended the execution of Scott Eizember on January 12, 2023, and afterward he announced a slowdown to Oklahoma's execution schedule citing the stress the schedule caused on Oklahoma Department of Corrections staff. In March, he announced his office would seek to stay the execution of Richard Glossip until 2024 to allow an independent counsel to review the case. After the independent review was released, his office filed a motion to vacate the murder conviction of Mr. Glossip in April 2023. The Black Wall Street Times advocated Julius Jones, a black man who has also maintained his innocence, should be afforded an independent counsel review of his case as well.

==== Education ====
In February 2023, Drummond withdrew his predecessor John M. O'Connor's opinion allowing funding for religious charter schools and encouraged members of the Statewide Virtual Charter School Board to reject the Archdiocese of Oklahoma City's charter school application. Drummond argued he was protecting religious freedom and “there will be a day in America where Christianity is a plurality, and not a majority.” He argued there is "this Christian nationalism... that is giving oxygen to this attempt to eviscerate the Establishment Clause." In June 2023, the school board approved an application for St. Isidore of Seville Catholic Virtual School and Drummond sued in the Oklahoma Supreme Court to block the application. In July 2024, the court ruled funding the school violated the Oklahoma Constitution and the Establishment Clause of the U.S. Constitution.

In April 2023, his office issued an opinion saying the law does not give the State Board of Education the ability to make administrative rules without proper direction from the state Legislature," meaning Ryan Walters's "rules regarding pornography in library books, sex education, parents rights and inappropriate materials" were unenforceable. Drummond also said he was not "taking a stance" on Walter's rules.

In March 2026, Drummond sued the Oklahoma Statewide Charter School Board over its rejection of a Jewish charter school (Ben Gamla) on nonsectarian grounds. Drummond alleged "the Board has improperly engineered a record that omits independent bases for rejection" in "a deliberate decision designed to avoid issues of state law when Ben Gamla files a lawsuit seeking to overturn the Oklahoma Supreme Court's decision in Drummond v. Oklahoma Statewide Virtual Charter School Board".

==== Environmental issues ====
In February 2023, Drummond joined other Republican attorneys general in opposing the proposed designation of the lesser prairie-chicken as an endangered species pursuant to the Endangered Species Act. He also joined other Republicans in opposing the Biden Administration's efforts to make changes to the term “waters of the United States” under the Clean Water Act which would partially restore protections that had been rolled back during the Trump Administration. (Note: The protections were rolled back during the period where the EPA was led by Drummond's predecessor Scott Pruitt.) In March, he joined other Republican state attorneys general in suing the Environmental Protection Agency after that agency rejected Oklahoma's ozone reduction plan, calling the federal plan "burdensome regulations" and "federal overreach".

== 2026 Oklahoma gubernatorial campaign ==
On January 13, 2025, Drummond launched a 2026 campaign for Governor of Oklahoma at a rally in Pawhuska, Oklahoma. He was endorsed by the Oklahoma Fraternal Order of Police at his campaign launch. Despite a 1st place finish in the first round of the primary on June 16, Drummond narrowly lost the August 25 runoff to former state senator Mike Mazzei, who went on to win the general election.

== Personal life ==
Drummond was married to Catherine Drummond. He married Wendy Poole in 2010. In 2014, Drummond and his wife, Wendy Drummond, bought the McBirney Mansion for $2.03 million to be their personal residence. Reality television star and entrepreneur Ree Drummond is married to Drummond's second cousin. Drummond has an interest in fashion that he credits to his wife.

Drummond is an Eagle Scout. He received a 2018 Outstanding Eagle Scout Award. In 2022, Drummond was inducted into the Osage County Historical Society's list of "Heroes and Legends."

In March 2022, Drummond's son, Oklahoma Air National Guard Major Alexander Drummond, survived the crash of an F-16 he was piloting in Beauregard Parish, Louisiana, during a routine training mission out of Ellington Field Joint Reserve Base in Texas after he erroneously ejected from the plane.

== Electoral history ==
=== 2018 ===
Republican primary results June 26, 2018
Party	Candidate	Votes	%
Republican	Michael J. Hunter	191,324	44.5
Republican	Gentner Drummond	165,479	38.5
Republican	Angela Bonilla	73,514	17.1
Total votes		430,317	100.00

Republican primary runoff results August 28, 2018
Party	Candidate	Votes	%
Republican	Michael J. Hunter	148,419	50.1
Republican	Gentner Drummond	148,148	50.0
Total votes		296,567	100.00

=== 2022 ===
Republican primary results June 28, 2022
Party	Candidate	Votes	%
Republican	Gentner Drummond	180,338	50.9
Republican	John O'Connor (incumbent)	174,125	49.1
Total votes		354,463	100.00

2022 Oklahoma Attorney General election
Party	Candidate	Votes	%	±%
Republican	Gentner Drummond	792,466	73.8%	+9.7%
Libertarian	Lynda Steele	281,923	26.2%	N/A
Total votes		1,074,389	100%	
Turnout		1,074,389	46.80%	
Registered electors		2,295,906		
Republican hold				

== Works cited ==
=== Journals ===
- Rostron, Allen (2024). "Saints, Satanists, and Religious Public Charter Schools". Tulsa Law Review. 59 (2).

Party political offices
Preceded by Michael J. Hunter	Republican nominee for Attorney General of Oklahoma; 2022	Succeeded by Jon Echols
Legal offices
Preceded by John M. O'Connor	Attorney General of Oklahoma; 2023–present	Incumbent
