= John M. O'Connor =

American lawyer (born 1954)

John O'Connor
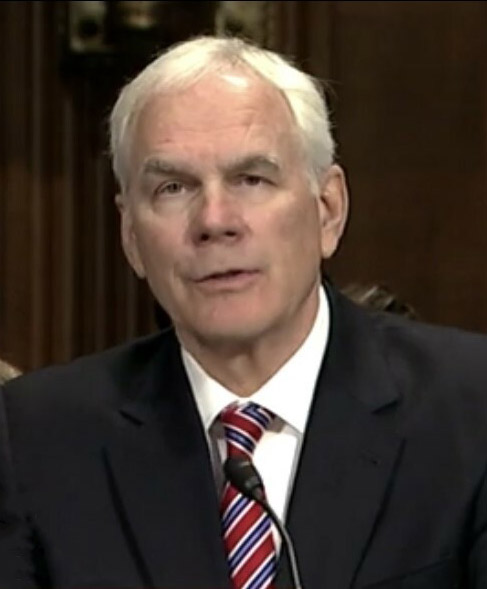

19th Attorney General of Oklahoma
- In office July 23, 2021 – January 9, 2023
- Appointed by: Kevin Stitt
- Governor: Kevin Stitt
- Preceded by: Michael J. Hunter
- Succeeded by: Gentner Drummond

Personal details
- Born: John Michael O'Connor; December 5, 1954 (age 71) Tulsa, Oklahoma, U.S.
- Party: Republican
- Children: 4
- Education: Oklahoma State University, Stillwater (BA); University of Tulsa (JD)

John Michael O'Connor (born December 5, 1954) is an American attorney and politician who served as the 19th attorney general of Oklahoma between 2021 and 2023. O'Connor was previously a shareholder of Hall Estill and a nominee to be a United States district judge of the United States District Court for the Eastern District of Oklahoma, the United States District Court for the Northern District of Oklahoma, and the United States District Court for the Western District of Oklahoma.

== Early life and education ==
A Tulsa native, O'Connor was born one of six children of parents Joseph, who worked on the Frisco railroad, and Mary O'Connor. He attended Oklahoma State University between 1973 and 1977, where he was student body president and earned a Bachelors of Arts. He then went to attend University of Tulsa College of Law between 1977 and 1980, where he was elected president of the student bar association and earned his Juris Doctor. He was awarded a Rotary International fellowship to study law at University of Bonn in Bonn, Germany between 1980 and 1981.

== Private practice ==
=== Early career ===
O'Connor has spent the majority of his career in private practice. While attending law school, he worked as a law clerk for Kothe, Nichols and Wolf from 1978 to 1979 and interned at Rosenstein, Fist and Ringold from 1979 to 1980. After finishing his year abroad in Germany, he returned to Rosenstein, Fist and Ringold as an Attorney from 1981 to 1983, before settling down to practice at Newton, O'Connor, Turner & Ketchum from 1983 to 2018.

O'Connor was appointed to numerous positions before his nomination for federal judgeship. He was first appointed to serve on the Oklahoma Dispute Resolution Advisory Board from 1984 to 1986 after being appointed by the administrative director of the Oklahoma Courts. He later served as the City of Tulsa Human Rights Conciliator from 1985 to 1988 after being appointed by the city. He was then appointed by the Oklahoma Legislature to the Oklahoma Adoption Law Reform Committee where he served from 1995 to 1998.

In 2015, Governor Mary Fallin appointed O'Connor to serve on the board of trustees for Oklahoma State University. O'Connor served on the City of Tulsa's Ethics Advisory Committee from March 2015 to December 2020 after being appointed by Mayor Dewey F. Bartlett Jr. and then being reappointed by Mayor G.T. Bynum.

In 2017, O'Connor was appointed to the Agency Performance and Accountability Commission by the Oklahoma State Senate President Pro-Tempore Mike Schulz. He was then elected vice-chair by the commission.

In 2018, Newton, O'Connor, Turner & Ketchum merged with the larger firm Hall Estill. O'Connor remained an attorney at Hall Estill until his appointment as Attorney General of Oklahoma.

=== Federal judicial nomination ===
In 2006, O'Connor was one of several attorneys who made the short list for consideration by the George W. Bush White House to serve as the federal District Court Judge for the United States District Court for the Northern District of Oklahoma, along with Judge Jerome Holmes, Judge Gregory Kent Frizzell, and T. Lane Wilson (who later served as a U.S. Magistrate Judge before returning to private practice).

On April 10, 2018, President Donald Trump nominated O'Connor to serve as a United States district judge for the United States District Courts of Northern, Eastern, and Western districts of Oklahoma. He was nominated to the seat vacated by Judge James H. Payne, who assumed senior status on August 1, 2017. On July 11, 2018, a hearing on his nomination was held before the Senate Judiciary Committee. During his hearings Senator Kamala Harris said the Judiciary Committee should not have moved forward with O'Connor's nomination before the ABA released its rating. Although O'Connor had received the highest Martindale-Hubbell anonymous peer review ratings for ethics and competence since 1995 and had been included on the "legal dream team" chosen by anonymously surveyed leading regional lawyers, judges and business leaders, the American Bar Association's Standing Committee on the Federal Judiciary unanimously rated O'Connor "not qualified" on August 21, 2018, citing the ABA committee's concerns about professional competence (on the specific basis that he lacked experience trying criminal law matters and citing time elapsed since he had last litigated a federal jury trial) and integrity (mentioning a dismissed lawsuit over fees). The ABA assessment was based on a process involving more than fifty interviews conducted and analyzed by two ABA committee reviewers (the ABA letter does not break out the results of such interviews quantitatively, but specifically the opinion of one anonymous interviewee). On January 3, 2019, his nomination was returned to the President under Rule XXXI, Paragraph 6 of the United States Senate. He withdrew from consideration for renomination, despite the support of both of Oklahoma's Senators.

== Political career ==
=== Attorney General of Oklahoma ===
On July 23, 2021, following the resignation of Michael J. Hunter, Governor Kevin Stitt appointed O’Connor as the 19th attorney general of Oklahoma.

O'Connor emphasized in his first statement as Attorney General of Oklahoma that he would ask the Supreme Court of the United States to overturn McGirt v. Oklahoma. An initial request by the state to overturn McGirt was withdrawn after a lower-court decision, but O'Connor has said he would continue to file other cases seeking to overturn it.

O'Connor joined an amicus brief in July 2021 by Republican attorneys general in Dobbs v. Jackson Women's Health Organization before the U.S. Supreme Court. The amicus brief asked the Court to overturn Roe v. Wade and Planned Parenthood v. Casey. O'Connor stated "The time has come to return the question of abortion to where it belongs- with the states."

O'Connor joined the bipartisan coalition of attorneys general demanding that the Federal Trade Commission enact a national rule targeting impersonation scams.

O'Connor favors the death penalty and has voiced his intent to resume executions in Oklahoma. In late August 2021, O'Connor requested the Oklahoma Court of Criminal Appeals to set the execution date for seven death-row inmates. The death penalty had not been used in Oklahoma since the botched executions of Clayton Lockett and Charles Warner.

O'Connor has spoken about the need to stop the black market cannabis industry in Oklahoma, where cannabis may be legally used for medical purposes.

O'Connor sued the federal government over COVID-19 vaccine requirements for members of the Oklahoma National Guard.

On June 10, 2022, O'Connor asked the Oklahoma Court of Criminal Appeals to set execution dates for 25 death row inmates. He requested the executions occur every four weeks on Thursdays, commencing on August 25. In January 2023, he announced a $226 million settlement with Allergan Pharmaceuticals, Walgreens, CVS and Walmart for their contribution to the opioid epidemic.

On June 27, 2022 O'Connor announced a $250 million settlement recovery from three opioid manufacturers operating in the state, with the settlement money to be used to prevent and treat opioid addiction. In August 2022, 61 lawmakers urged O'Connor to support death row inmate Richard Glossip's request for a new hearing. "Without support from O'Connor, the Court of Criminal Appeals is expected to reject Glossip's claims of innocence, as it has done before."

In December 2022, O'Connor issued an attorney general's opinion concluding "it was very likely" the U.S. Supreme Court would strike down Oklahoma laws preventing the funding of a religious charter school based on Zelman v. Simmons-Harris. The opinion was later withdrawn by Attorney General Gentner Drummond in 2023.

=== 2022 Attorney General election ===
O'Connor ran for election to a full term as attorney general in 2022. He faced Tulsa attorney Gentner Drummond in a primary race. Drummond narrowly defeated O'Connor for the Republican Party's nomination.

== Personal life ==
He and his wife Lucia have four children and ten grandchildren. O'Connor is Catholic.

== See also ==
- Donald Trump judicial appointment controversies

Legal offices
Preceded by Dawn Cash; Acting	Attorney General of Oklahoma; 2021–2023	Succeeded by Gentner Drummond
