= Pioneer Women's Memorial (Sydney) =

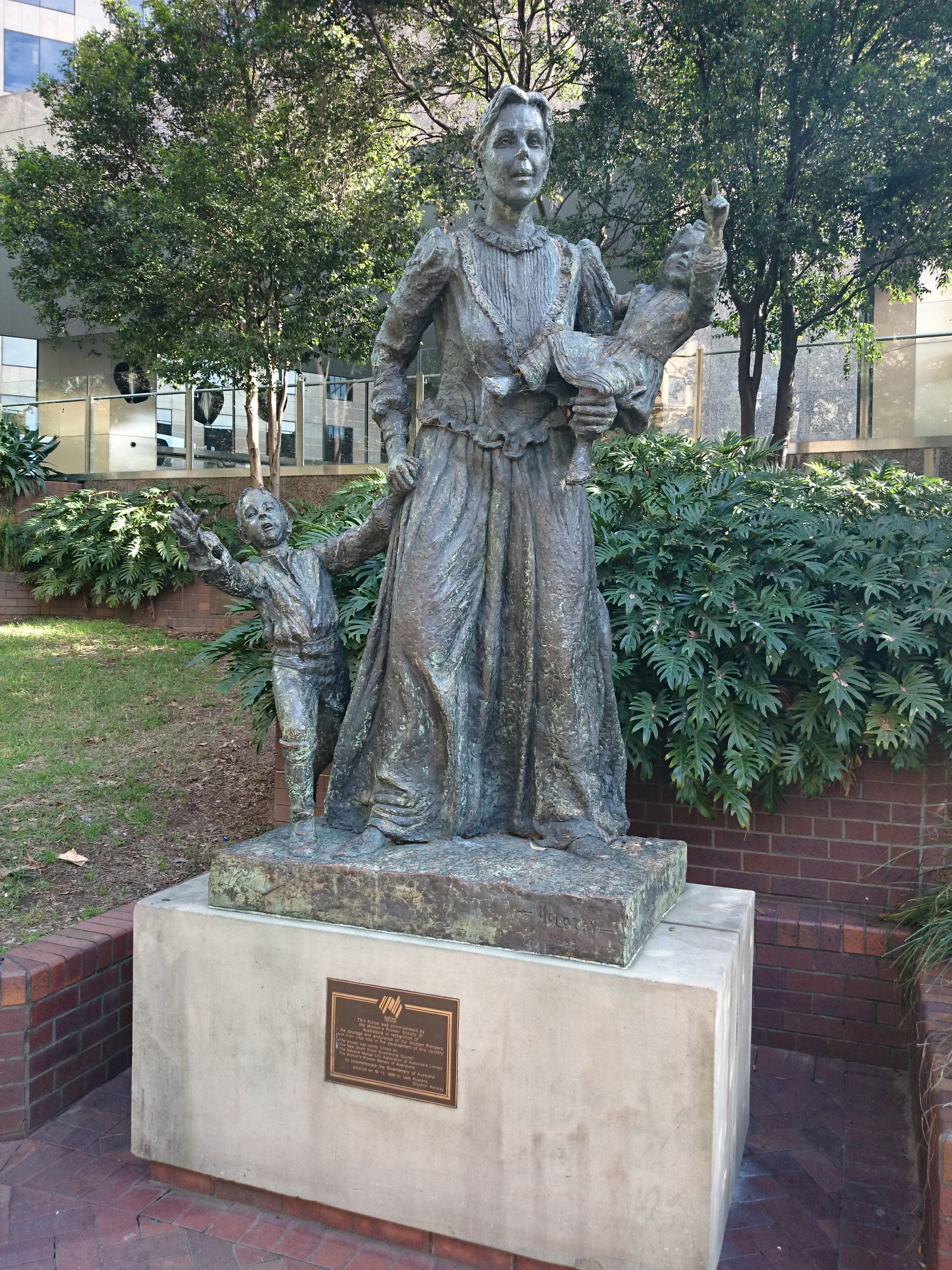
- Artist: Alex Koloszy
- Year: 1988
- Type: bronze
- Location: Sydney, New South Wales, Australia

The Pioneer Women's Memorial is situated in the Jessie Street Gardens in Sydney, New South Wales, Australia. It honours the contribution of women to the colonisation of Australia.

The memorial was commissioned by the Women's Pioneer Society of Australasia as part of Australia's bicentenary celebrations. It was designed and constructed by sculptor Alex Kolozsy. The sculpture is of a bronze statue of a woman carrying a baby in her left arm while pulling a young child alongside her on her right. It is 3.5 metres tall.

The memorial was unveiled on 19 November 1988, by Lady Rowland, the spouse of the governor of New South Wales at the time.
