= Michael J. Hunter =

American politician (born 1956)

Mike Hunter
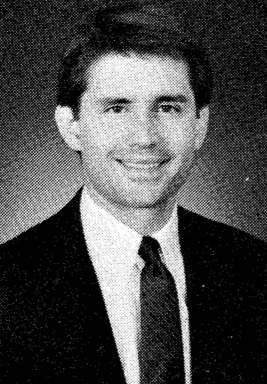
- Hunter in 1989

18th Attorney General of Oklahoma
- In office February 20, 2017 – June 1, 2021
- Appointed by: Mary Fallin (Note: Elected to a full term in 2018.)
- Governor: Mary Fallin; Kevin Stitt
- Preceded by: Scott Pruitt
- Succeeded by: John M. O'Connor

Secretary of State of Oklahoma
- In office November 1, 2016 – February 20, 2017
- Governor: Mary Fallin
- Preceded by: Chris Benge
- Succeeded by: Dave Lopez
- In office March 16, 1999 – October 16, 2002
- Governor: Frank Keating
- Preceded by: Tom Cole
- Succeeded by: Kay Dudley

Secretary of the Oklahoma Commissioners of the Land Office
- In office August 3, 2009 – September 1, 2010
- Governor: Brad Henry
- Preceded by: Clifton Scott
- Succeeded by: Doug Allen (acting)

Member of the Oklahoma House of Representatives from the 85th district
- In office January 8, 1985 – January 8, 1991
- Preceded by: Porter Davis
- Succeeded by: Mary Fallin

Personal details
- Born: July 2, 1956 (age 69) Garfield County, Oklahoma, U.S.
- Party: Republican
- Spouse(s): Cheryl Plaxico (formerly) Kim Bailey (m. 2022)
- Children: 2
- Education: Oklahoma State University (BA); University of Oklahoma (JD)

Michael J. Hunter (born July 2, 1956) is an American politician from the state of Oklahoma. Hunter served as the Secretary of State of Oklahoma from 1999 to 2002, having been appointed by Governor of Oklahoma Frank Keating. On November 1, 2016, he was appointed to the same post by Governor Mary Fallin. He also served as Special Counsel to the Governor. On February 20, 2017, Hunter was appointed Attorney General of Oklahoma to replace Scott Pruitt who resigned to become the Administrator of the Environmental Protection Agency. On November 8, 2018, Hunter won election as Attorney General.

On May 26, 2021, Hunter announced he was resigning effective June 1.

== Early life and education ==
Hunter was born on July 2, 1956, to Chester and Phyllis Hunter. He grew up on a farm in Garfield County, Oklahoma and is a fourth generation Oklahoman. He received his undergraduate degree from Oklahoma State University in 1978. He graduated from the University of Oklahoma College of Law in 1982. In law school he was the president of the Student Bar Association. Upon graduation Hunter entered private practice, specializing in energy, real property, public employment law and utility regulation.

== Oklahoma politics ==
In 1984, Hunter was elected to the Oklahoma House of Representatives. While in the House, he served as Chairman of the Republican Caucus and Vice Chairman of the House Criminal Justice Committee. In 1988, he was one of the eight lawmakers recognized by the Daily Oklahoman as Oklahoma's Best Legislators. That same year he was the recipient of the Oklahoma District Attorneys' Legislative Appreciation Award for his work in criminal justice. Hunter remained in the House until 1991.

After leaving the Oklahoma Legislature, Hunter returned to private practice until 1993. From 1993 to 1994, Hunter served as the General Counsel of the Oklahoma Corporation Commission, the state's regulatory authority for public utilities, oil and gas, transportation and pipelines companies.

In 1994, Hunter was the Republican nominee for Attorney General of Oklahoma. He lost the election to Democratic Muskogee County District Attorney Drew Edmondson.

== Federal politics ==
Following the election of J. C. Watts as the Congressman for Oklahoma's 4th congressional district, Hunter was appointed as Watts' chief of staff in 1995, serving until 1999. As Watts' chief of staff, Hunter managed his offices in Washington, D.C., Norman, Oklahoma and Lawton, Oklahoma. He also served as legal counsel to Congressman Watts in his work on the National Security and the Transportation and Infrastructure Committees.

== Keating administration ==
In 1998, incumbent Republican Governor of Oklahoma Frank Keating was reelected to second four-year term. Keating's first Secretary of State Tom Cole stepped down to return to the private sector. On March 16, 1999, Keating appointed Hunter to serve as the 29th Oklahoma Secretary of State. In addition to his duties as Secretary of State, Hunter served as Governor Keating's chief liaison to the Oklahoma Legislature and to the state's Congressional delegation in Washington, D.C.

== Private sector ==
Hunter resigned as Secretary of State in October 2002 to become the executive vice president and chief operating officer of the American Council of Life Insurers under president and CEO Frank Keating. He managed the organization's $47 million budget and 135 member staff. The ACLI is the advocacy, legal and research arm of the life insurance industry.

In 2011, after serving as Secretary of the Commissioners of the Oklahoma Land Office, Hunter was named chief operating officer of the American Bankers Association, serving again under Keating as president and CEO. Hunter oversees the ABA's government relations, public policy, legal, and communications activities.

== Return to Oklahoma 2009-10 and 2015 ==
In August 2009, Democratic Governor of Oklahoma Brad Henry appointed Hunter the 47th Secretary of the Commissioners of the Land Office. The Commissioners of the Land Office is charged with managing the lands the U.S. Congress granted to Oklahoma at statehood to help benefit public education. The office also administers the trust funds and proceeds derived from selling and renting the public lands. Hunter resigned from the Land Office effective September 1, 2010. Douglas Allen, the Assistant Secretary of the Commissioners of the Land Office under Hunter, was appointed interim Secretary, and later Secretary, by the Commissioners.

In June 2015, Hunter was appointed First Assistant Attorney General of the State of Oklahoma by Attorney General Scott Pruitt.

== Oklahoma Attorney General ==
On February 17, 2017, Oklahoma Attorney General Scott Pruitt resigned to become Administrator of the Environmental Protection Agency under President Donald Trump. To fill the vacancy caused by Pruitt's resignation, Governor Mary Fallin appointed Hunter as Attorney General to fill the remainder of Pruitt's unexpired term on February 20, 2017. In the 2018 Oklahoma state elections, Hunter ran for a full term. In the Republican primary election, Hunter led the first round with 44.5 percent of the vote, while Gentner Drummond finished in second with 38.5 percent to advance to a runoff election. Hunter defeated Drummond in the runoff by 271 votes. Hunter then defeated Mark Myles, the Democratic Party nominee, in the November general election.

On May 26, 2021, five days after filing for divorce, Hunter announced he was resigning effective June 1 because "certain personal matters that are becoming public will become a distraction for this office".

=== Lawsuits against opioid manufacturers ===
Early in his term as Attorney General, Hunter was named the chair of the Oklahoma Commission on Opioid Abuse, following the passage of Senate Concurrent Resolution 12. Hunter, along with legislative leaders and experts worked on a plan to intended to address the increases in addiction and overdoses from opioids. The full plan was released in January 2018, and included 31 policy recommendations, eight of which later became law.

Hunter filed a series of lawsuits against opioid manufacturers and associated companies. In a case filed in April 2017, the state of Oklahoma under Attorney General Hunter accused Purdue Pharma, Allergan, Cephalon and Janssen Pharmaceuticals of deceptive marketing practices, contributing to over-prescribing of opioids in the state. In March 2019, a settlement was announced, with Purdue Pharma agreeing to pay $270 million, with the Oklahoma State University Health Sciences initially negotiated to receive the largest share of the funds ($177 million) to increase treatment of addiction medicine. After the announcement, members of the Oklahoma state legislature raised concerns about the nature of the settlement, and the potential for it to circumvent the traditional legislative appropriations process. Additional opioid makers agreed to pay settlements in May 2019.

In 2018, Hunter filed suit against multinational consumer products manufacturer Johnson & Johnson, seeking $17.2 billion in damages. Under Hunter's direction, the state pursued a litigation strategy applying a public nuisance framework to the negative impacts of opioid abuse on the state of Oklahoma. The case began trial in the summer of 2019, and gained national attention, as the potential ruling was thought to be an indicator of the prospects for other states and localities aiming to also address the opioid epidemic.

On August 26, 2019, Judge Thad Balkman of the Cleveland County District Court announced a $572 million verdict against Johnson & of Johnson, finding the company liable for opioid-related harms, but not at the level proposed by the state's legal team. Judge Balkman later reduced the verdict by $107 million due to erroneous calculations. Both the state of Oklahoma and Johnson and Johnson have appealed the verdict, as of April 2020. The Oklahoma Supreme Court overturned the judgment against Johnson and Johnson in November 2021. https://www.pbs.org/newshour/amp/nation/oklahoma-court-overturns-465m-opioid-ruling-against-jj

In May 2020, Hunter filed lawsuits against three more opioid manufacturers (AmerisourceBergen Corp., Cardinal Health, and McKesson) in Bryan County District Court. The lawsuits allege that the companies were irresponsible and helped fuel the opioid crisis in Oklahoma. Bryan County has seen a large number of opioid overdoses and deaths. According to Health Crisis Alert, "According to the suits, in 2017, the three companies provided enough opioids to Bryan County that every adult resident there could have had 144 hydrocodone tablets."

== Personal life ==
Hunter was married to Cheryl Plaxico Hunter. She is a practicing lawyer who served as a member of the Oklahoma State Regents for Higher Education from 2000 to 2009, appointed by Governor Frank Keating. They have two sons, Barrett and Brock. On May 21, 2021, Michael Hunter filed for divorce, reportedly because he had an extramarital affair with a state government employee. Hunter later remarried in March 2022 to Kim Bailey, in a ceremony performed by J. C. Watts.

== Election history ==
August 23, 1994, Attorney General of Oklahoma Republican primary election results
Candidates	Party	Votes	%
Mike Hunter	Republican Party	104,962	58.15%
Mark Gibson	Republican Party	75,547	41.85%
Total		180,509	100%
Source: 1994 Primary Results

November 8, 1994, Attorney General of Oklahoma election results
Candidates	Party	Votes	%
Drew Edmondson	Democratic Party	507,039	52.16%
Mike Hunter	Republican Party	465,031	47.84%
Total		972,800	100%
Source: 1994 General Results

June 26, 2018, Attorney General of Oklahoma Republican primary election results
Candidates	Party	Votes	%
Angela Bonilla	Republican Party	73,514	17.08%
Mike Hunter	Republican Party	191,324	44.46%
Gentner Drummond	Republican Party	165,479	38.46%
Total		430,317	100%
Source: 2018 Primary Results

August 28, 2018, Attorney General of Oklahoma Republican runoff election results
Candidates	Party	Votes	%
Mike Hunter	Republican Party	148,418	50.05
Gentner Drummond	Republican Party	148,148	49.95
Total		296,567	100.00
Source: 2018 Primary Results

November 8, 2018, Attorney General of Oklahoma general election results
Candidates	Party	Votes	%
Mike Hunter	Republican Party	750,769	64.03%
Mark Myles	Democratic Party	421,699	35.97%
Total		1,172,468	100%
Source: 2018 General Election Results

== Notes ==
Party political offices
Vacant Title last held by Brian Griffin	Republican nominee for Attorney General of Oklahoma; 1994	Vacant Title next held by Denise Bode
Preceded by Scott Pruitt	Republican nominee for Attorney General of Oklahoma; 2018	Succeeded by Gentner Drummond
Political offices
Preceded by Tom Cole	Secretary of State of Oklahoma; 1999–2002	Succeeded by Kay Dudley
Preceded by Clifton Scott	Secretary of the Oklahoma Commissioners of the Land Office; 2009–2010	Succeeded by Doug Allen; Acting
Preceded by Chris Benge	Secretary of State of Oklahoma; 2016–2017	Succeeded by Tod Wall; Acting
Legal offices
Preceded by Cara Rodriguez; Acting	Attorney General of Oklahoma; 2017–2021	Succeeded by Dawn Cash; Acting
