= Ree Drummond =

American author known as "The Pioneer Woman"

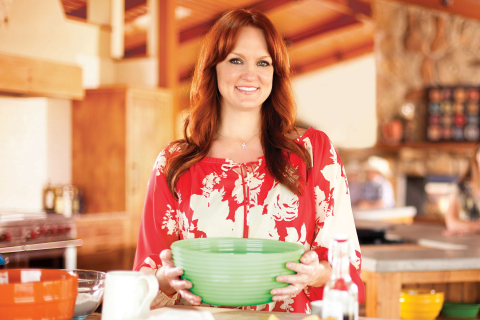
- Drummond in 2014
- Born: Anne Marie Smith; January 6, 1969 (age 57); Bartlesville, Oklahoma, U.S.
- Other name: Ree
- Education: University of Southern California
- Occupations: Blogger, author, television personality
- Spouse: Ladd Drummond (m. 1996)
- Children: 5
- Writing career
- Pen name: The Pioneer Woman
- Period: 2006–present
- Genres: Biography, cookbook
- Subjects: Cooking, photography, home and garden, entertainment
- Notable awards: Weblog of the Year 2009, 2010 (Bloggies)
- Website: thepioneerwoman.com

Anne Marie "Ree" Drummond (née Smith, born January 6, 1969) is an American blogger, author, food writer, and television personality. Drummond became known for her blog, The Pioneer Woman, which documented her life in rural Oklahoma.

Capitalizing on the success of her blog, Drummond stars in her own television program, also titled The Pioneer Woman, on The Food Network which began in 2011. She has also written cookbooks, a children's book, and an autobiography. In 2015, Drummond launched a "homey lifestyle" product line of cookware, cutlery, appliances, clothing and outdoor living products.

== Early life and education ==
Drummond, nicknamed "Ree", grew up in a home overlooking the grounds of a country club in the oil town of Bartlesville, Oklahoma, with two brothers and a sister. Drummond was raised Episcopalian.

Drummond graduated from Bartlesville High School in 1987, after which she left Oklahoma to attend college in Los Angeles, California. She graduated from the University of Southern California in 1991, having first studied journalism before switching to gerontology. After graduation, she hoped to attend law school in Chicago, but her plans changed unexpectedly when she met and married her husband, Ladd Drummond. Her husband is a member of the wealthy Drummond ranching family.

== Career ==
=== Blog at ThePioneerWoman.com ===
Drummond began blogging in May 2006, initially using the subdomain pioneerwoman.typepad.com within the Typepad blogging service. She registered her own domain thepioneerwoman.com on October 18, 2006. Drummond's blog, The Pioneer Woman, was originally titled Confessions of a Pioneer Woman. The site is hosted by Rackspace.

Drummond writes about topics such as ranch life and homeschooling. About a year after launching her blog, she posted her first recipe and a tutorial on "How to Cook a Steak". The blog became popular and won Weblog of the Year in the 2010 Bloggies.

As of September 2009, Drummond's blog reportedly received 13 million page views per month. On May 9, 2011, the blog's popularity had risen to approximately 23.3 million page views per month and 4.4 million unique visitors. According to an article in The New Yorker, "This is roughly the same number of people who read The Daily Beast". An article in the Toronto newspaper The Globe and Mail described it as "[s]lickly photographed with legions of fans ... arguably the mother of all farm girl blogs." Estimates for her site's income suggest it earns $1 million or more per year from display (advertisement) income.

=== Food community ===
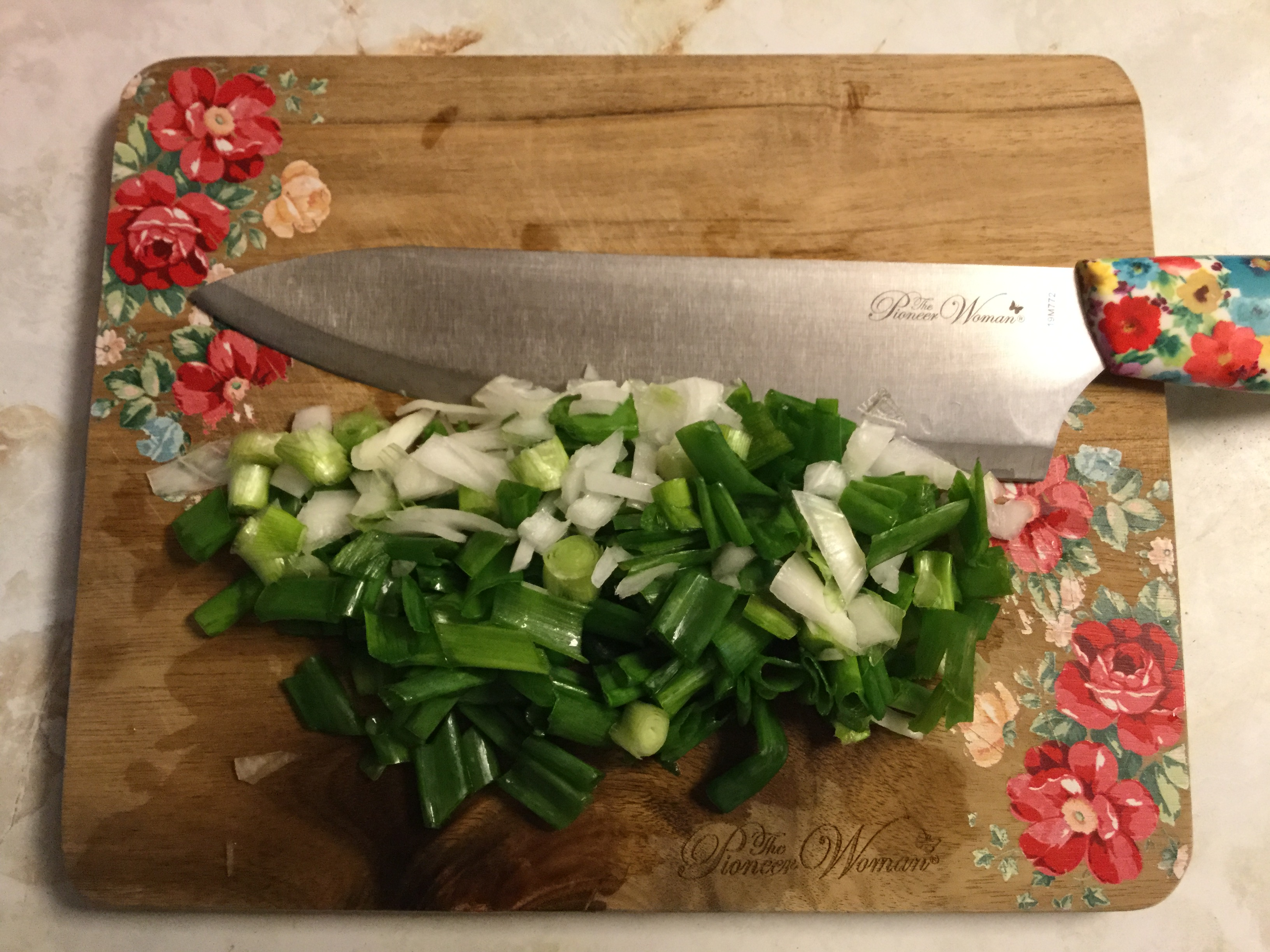
Floral design chef knife and cutting board are products marketed by Drummond's Pioneer Woman company

In April 2008, Drummond held a giveaway contest in the cooking section of her blog The Pioneer Woman in which she asked readers to share one of their favorite recipes; the response inspired her to create a recipe sharing site. In 2009, Drummond launched TastyKitchen.com – community recipe-sharing site.

=== Television ===
Drummond made her television debut on an episode of Throwdown! with Bobby Flay in 2010. In April 2011, the Food Network announced that Drummond would host her own daytime television series on the network. The Pioneer Woman premiered on Saturday, August 27, 2011.

=== Film ===
On March 19, 2010, Drummond confirmed media reports that Columbia Pictures had acquired the film rights to her book From Black Heels to Tractor Wheels. The production company was reported to be in talks with Reese Witherspoon to star as Drummond in a motion picture based on the book. As of 2023, no further information has been released about this project.

== Personal life ==
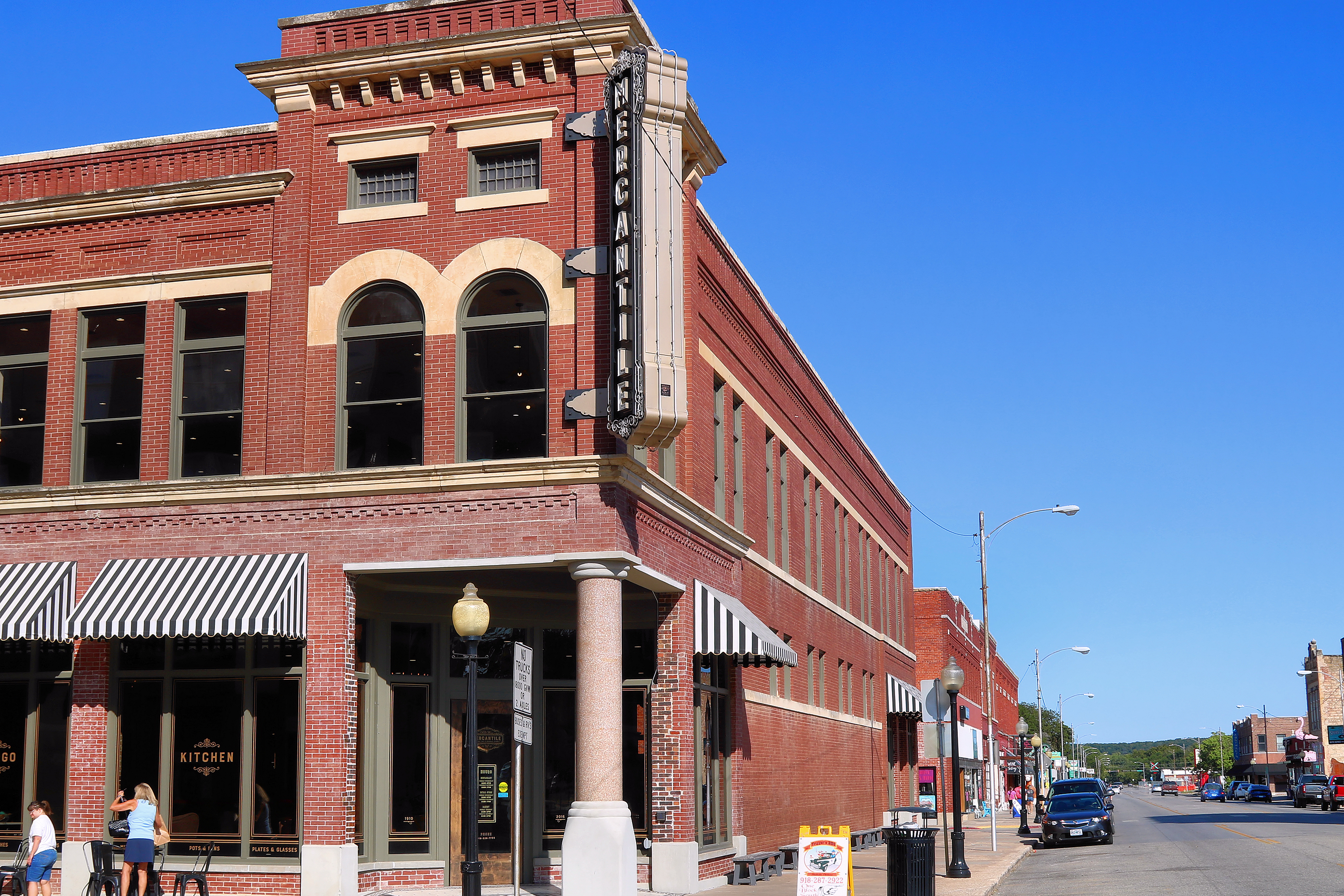
The Mercantile in Pawhuska, Oklahoma

On September 21, 1996, Drummond married Ladd Drummond (born January 22, 1969), a fourth-generation member of the prominent Osage County cattle ranching Drummond family whom she refers to as "the Marlboro Man" in her books and her blog. They spent their honeymoon in Australia and live on a remote working cattle ranch approximately 8 miles west of Pawhuska, Oklahoma. They have five children.

In late 2016, the Drummonds opened The Mercantile, a restaurant retail store located in a 100-year-old downtown Pawhuska building that they bought and began renovating in 2012.

In 2018, the Drummonds opened a bed and breakfast in downtown Pawhuska, "The Boarding House", as well as a pizzeria, "P-Town Pizza". The Drummonds opened "Charlie's Sweet Shop", an ice cream and candy shop, in 2020. The shop was named after their basset hound dog Charlie, who died in 2017.

== Bibliography ==
- The Pioneer Woman Cooks: Recipes from an Accidental Country Girl: Drummond's first cookbook, published in October 2009. A New York Times reviewer described Drummond as "funny, enthusiastic and self-deprecating."
- Black Heels to Tractor Wheel: published in February 2011 by William Morrow, an imprint of HarperCollins.
- Charlie the Ranch Dog: a children's book published in April 2011 featuring her family's beloved Basset Hound Charlie. According to Publishers Weekly, "Adult readers will recognize in Charlie's voice the understated humor that has made Drummond's blog so successful; kids should find it irresistible." The book was illustrated by Diane deGroat, an illustrator of more than 120 children's books.
- The Pioneer Woman Cooks: Food from My Frontier: Drummond's second cookbook, released in March 2012.
- Charlie and the Christmas Kitty: Drummond's second children's book about the family's dog, released in December 2012.
- The Pioneer Woman Cooks: A Year of Holidays: 140 Step-by-Step Recipes for Simple, Scrumptious Celebrations: released October 29, 2013.
- Charlie and the New Baby: Drummond's third children's book about the family's basset hound; released on April 29, 2014.
- Charlie the Ranch Dog: Charlie Goes to the Doctor: released June 17, 2014.
- Charlie the Ranch Dog: Stuck in the Mud: released January 6, 2015.
- Charlie Plays Ball: released March 24, 2015.
- The Pioneer Woman Cooks: Dinnertime: a cookbook featuring 125 dinner recipes. Released October 20, 2015.
- Charlie the Ranch Dog: Rock Star: released November 17, 2015.
- Little Ree: Released March 28, 2017.
- The Pioneer Woman Cooks: Come and Get It!: a cookbook featuring 120 recipes. Released October 24, 2017.
- Little Ree: Best Friends Forever!: released March 27, 2018
- The Pioneer Woman Cooks: Super Easy!: released October 19, 2021.
- Ree's Best Family Meals: released online August 2, 2022.
