= The Pioneer Woman (TV series) =

American cooking television series

- Genre: Food reality television
- Directed by: Olivia Ball
- Starring: Ree Drummond
- Country of origin: United States
- Original language: English
- No. of seasons: 40
- No. of episodes: 500+

Production
- Executive producer: Rachel Purnell
- Producer: Pacific Productions
- Production locations: Pawhuska, Oklahoma, United States
- Running time: 22:00

Original release
- Network: Food Network
- Release: August 27, 2011 – present

The Pioneer Woman is an American cooking show that has aired on Food Network since 2011. It is presented by Ree Drummond, whose blog was the namesake for the show. The series features Drummond cooking for her family and friends, primarily in the lodge at the Drummond Ranch near Pawhuska, Oklahoma.

== Gallery ==
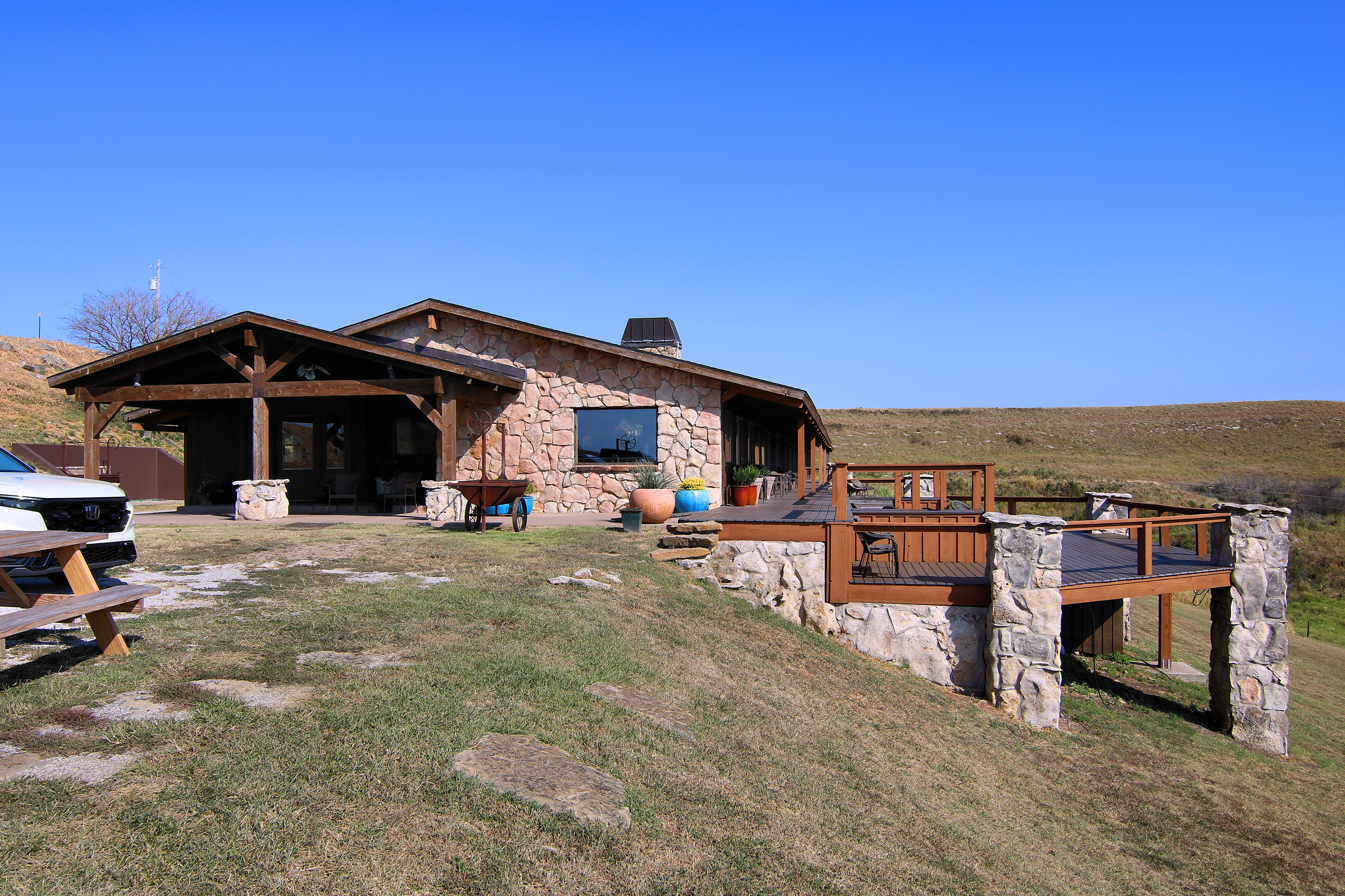
The lodge at the Drummond Ranch.

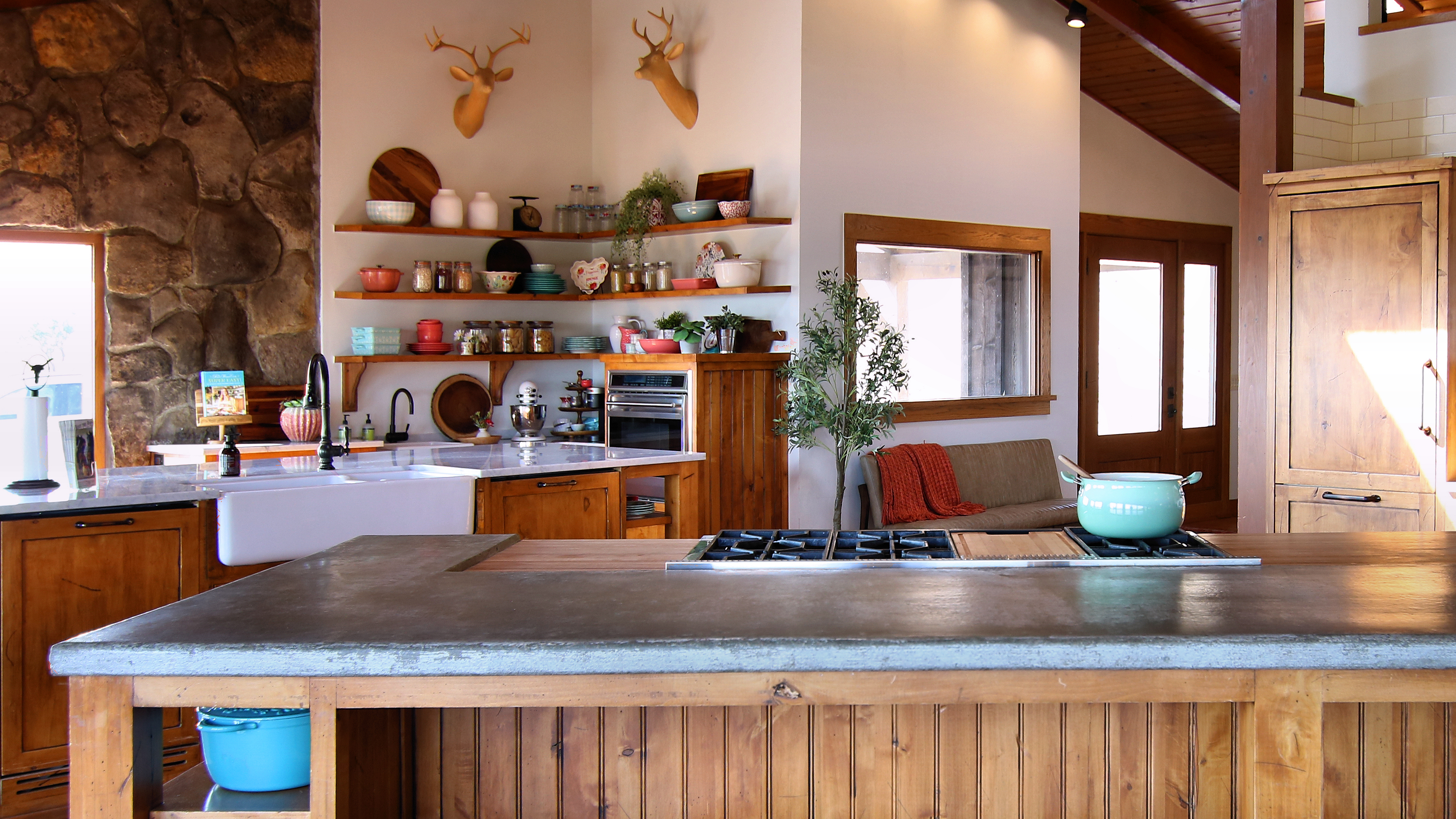
The kitchen of the lodge, where Pioneer Woman is recorded.
