= Glossip v. Oklahoma =

- Supreme Court of the United States

Argued October 9, 2024 Decided February 25, 2025
- Full case name: Richard Eugene Glossip v. Oklahoma
- Docket nos.: 22-7466; 22-6500; 22A941
- Citations: 604 U.S. 226 (more)
- Argument: Oral argument
- Decision: Opinion

Case history
- Prior: Glossip v. State, 529 P.3d 218 (Okla. Crim. App. 2023)

Questions presented
- 1. Whether the State's suppression of the key prosecution witness's admission that he was under psychiatric care and failure to correct that witness's false testimony about that care and related diagnosis violate due process.; 2. Whether the entirety of the suppressed evidence must be considered when assessing the materiality of Brady and Napue claims.; 3. Whether due process requires reversal when a capital conviction is so erroneous that the State no longer seeks to defend it.; 4. Whether the Oklahoma Court of Criminal Appeals' holding that the Oklahoma Post-Conviction Procedure Act precluded post-conviction relief is an adequate and independent state ground for the judgment.

Holding
- 1. This Court has jurisdiction to review the OCCA’s judgment.; 2. The prosecution violated its constitutional obligation to correct false testimony.

Court membership
- Chief Justice John Roberts Associate Justices Clarence Thomas · Samuel Alito; Sonia Sotomayor · Elena Kagan; Neil Gorsuch · Brett Kavanaugh; Amy Coney Barrett · Ketanji Brown Jackson

Case opinions
- Majority: Sotomayor, joined by Roberts, Kagan, Kavanaugh, Jackson; Barrett (Part II)
- Concur/dissent: Barrett
- Dissent: Thomas, joined by Alito; Barrett (Parts IV-A-1, IV-A-2, and IV-A-3)
- Gorsuch took no part in the consideration or decision of the case.

Laws applied
- U.S. Const. amend. XIV; Oklahoma Post Conviction Procedure Act

Glossip v. Oklahoma, 604 U.S. 226 (2025), is a United States Supreme Court case. The Court decided that, in light of newly disclosed evidence and the state attorney general's confession of error, Richard Glossip should receive a new trial.

== Background ==
=== Conviction and first appeals ===
Shortly before dawn on January 7, 1997, Justin Sneed murdered Barry Van Treese, the owner of the Best Budget Inn motel in Oklahoma City. In order to avoid the death penalty, Sneed agreed to testify against Richard Glossip—the motel's manager—and implicate him in an alleged murder-for-hire scheme. At trial, Glossip was convicted of commissioning the murder of Van Treese, and later sentenced to death.

At the time of the murder, Sneed was living rent-free at the Best Budget Inn, where he engaged in informal handyman work. It would later come to light that Sneed was addicted to methamphetamine, and had a history of violent crime. Following his trial in 1998, Glossip appealed on the grounds that he received ineffective assistance of counsel. At trial, Glossip's attorney did not show the jury a video of police appearing to coerce Sneed into implicating him. In 2001, an appeals court agreed, and granted Glossip a new trial.

Amid questions about Sneed's reliability as a witness, Glossip's attorney requested that, before retrial, the State disclose all of Sneed's statements (written and spoken), especially those given between the first and second trials. The State agreed, and insisted that it had disclosed all such statements. At retrial, Glossip's attorney again did not show the footage of the police interrogation, although on the second occasion, the appeals court found that this was acceptable.

=== Evidence ===
In the summer of 2022, Glossip received several large boxes containing the trial prosecutor's files. Included in the materials was a memorandum appearing to demonstrate the State coaching Sneed into changing material aspects of his testimony. Around the same time, an office representing Sneed provided corroboration demonstrating his desire to recant his original testimony. In early 2023, the State disclosed to Glossip a note that they believe indicates Sneed told prosecutors that he was prescribed lithium by a psychiatrist. This contradicts Sneed's testimony at the second trial, where he stated that, at the time of his arrest, he was not under the care of a psychiatrist and that he had only erroneously been prescribed lithium.

In the spring of 2023, Glossip filed a new application for post-conviction relief raising, among other things, issues regarding knowledge of Sneed's psychiatric treatment and suppression of a note with "on lithium?" written on it.

=== Independent investigations ===
Around the same time, the state of Oklahoma (through its Attorney General, Gentner Drummond) was conducting its own inquiry into the reliability of Glossip's conviction. This was in addition to another independent investigation undertaken by sixty-two Oklahoma legislators. The Drummond report stated that the intentional withholding of evidence, particularly the evidence regarding Sneed's bipolar disorder, casts serious doubt on the validity of Glossip's conviction. In light of this report, Drummond requested that the Oklahoma Court of Criminal Appeals (OCCA) reverse Glossip's conviction based on the prosecutor's failure to correct Sneed's false testimony. Despite this, the OCCA denied Glossip's application.

== Supreme Court ==
On April 26, 2023, Glossip submitted an application to the Supreme Court, requesting that his execution be stayed, pending the Court's disposition of petition for writs of certiorari. On May 5, Glossip's application for stay of execution was granted. On January 22, 2024, Glossip's petitions for writs of certiorari were granted. On January 26, the Court appointed Christopher G Michel to brief and argue the case as amicus curiae in support of the OCCA’s judgment below.

Glossip's case was argued before the Supreme Court on October 9, 2024. Due to his prior involvement in the case, including Glossip v. Gross, as a judge on the United States Court of Appeals for the Tenth Circuit, Justice Gorsuch recused himself from the case's proceedings.

=== Majority ===
On February 25, 2025, the Supreme Court reversed the OCCA's judgment and ordered a new trial for Richard Glossip. Writing for the majority, Associate Justice Sonia Sotomayor accepted Glossip's interpretation of the prosecutors' notes as indicating awareness of Sneed's bipolar disorder because the alternative view in the Van Treese family's amicus brief was never raised during state court proceedings. Citing Michigan v. Long (1983), the majority argued it had appellate jurisdiction over this state court decision because it was unclear whether Oklahoma's standard for post-conviction relief solely involved state-specific issues.

=== Dissent ===
Associate Justice Clarence Thomas dissented, arguing that the variation in Sneed's testimony was immaterial because prosecutors should have known that Sneed's lithium prescription indicated bipolar disorder. Thomas further criticized Oklahoma Attorney General Drummond for relying on independent counsel Rex Duncan's interpretation of prosecutor Connie Smothermon's notes, rather than meaningfully interviewing her.

Second, Thomas noted that even if federal courts identified a Napue violation, Glossip's case rested on further state law standards for post-conviction relief that were solely under OCCA's purview. Thus, he criticized the Supreme Court's judgement an unnecessary intrusion on state law. Third, Thomas faulted the majority for considering the variation in Sneed's testimony as materially important because a correction could have prompted doubt among the jury, a much lower burden than the actual materiality standard of Napue v. Illinois (1959).

Fourth, Thomas faulted the majority for ordering a new trial, rather than remanding for further evidentiary hearings in state court. While Justice Samuel Alito fully joined Thomas' dissent, Justice Barrett only joined portions A-1, A-2, and A-3 of this fourth section.

== See also ==
- Richard Glossip
- Glossip v. Gross
- Glossip v. Chandler
