= David Prater =

David Prater may refer to:

- Dave Prater (1937–1988), American singer and musician
- David Prater (attorney), American attorney, judge, and politician
