= Kevin McDugle =

American politician

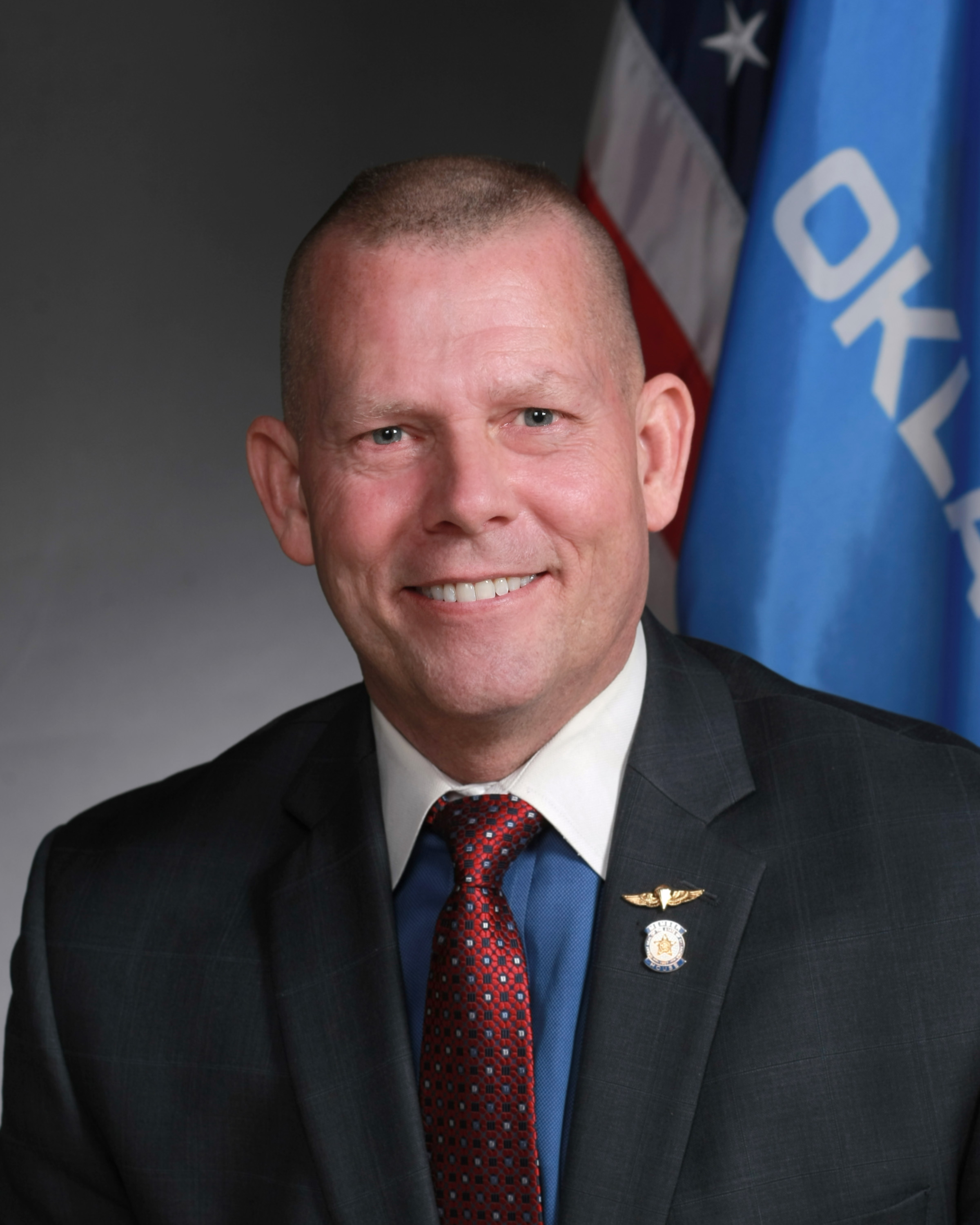

Member of the Oklahoma House of Representatives from the 12th district
- In office November 17, 2016 – November 20, 2024
- Preceded by: Wade Rousselot
- Succeeded by: Mark Chapman

Personal details
- Born: May 3, 1967 (age 59) Morrison, Oklahoma, U.S.
- Party: Republican

Kevin Wayne McDugle (born May 3, 1967) is an American politician who served in the Oklahoma House of Representatives representing the 12th district from 2016 to 2024. He has appeared on Dr. Phil.

== Political career ==
Following the serious injury of people blocking a road at a Black Lives Matter protest in 2020, McDugle authored a bill that would grant immunity to drivers engaging in vehicle-ramming attacks.

McDugle has advocated for an incarcerated Oklahoma man on death row, Richard Glossip, who has eaten his last meal three times, saying "They can show me nothing that ties him, and the one thing they have is a witness that says that he was the one that told him to commit the murder. Guess who that witness was? The actual murderer that beat him with a baseball bat. He's the witness, and what did he get for that testimony? He got off of death row himself and got life in prison."

In May 2023, McDugle accused the Oklahoma District Attorneys Council, a lobbying group, of applying "pressure across the system to protect their power" and claimed district attorneys are "deeply embedded" in Oklahoma's branches of government in his attempt to help Richard Glossip. The Council has also "actively sought to undermine Prater's successor, Vicki Behenna, the county's first female elected DA." Prater and the Council knows "that if the courts agree that Glossip's conviction should be overturned, it will be up to Behenna to decide whether to retry the case." McDugle worked with Dr. Phil to bring attention to Glossip's case. McDugle is quoted as saying "This case is no longer about justice. It's about power, pride, and politics." He has threatened to try to legislatively put a stop to the death penalty in Oklahoma if Glossip is executed. He criticizes former DAs in the legislature who are in charge of committees who will not come up with sentencing reform solutions.

Continuing with the Oklahoma Pardon and Parole Board's high turnover, in July 2023 Cathy Stoker resigned from the board saying that her role was not a "good fit" and Kevin Buchanan, a former district attorney for Washington County and Nowata County from Bartlesville, was appointed by Governor Stitt to replace her. She resigned just before Richard Smothermon did in August 2023 after McDugle criticized the board and Smothermon specifically for not giving Richard Glossip five full board votes. Smothermon gave no direct reason for why he resigned, but the Pardon and Parole Board is "currently the target of a lawsuit brought by death-row inmate Richard Glossip after he was denied a clemency recommendation." McDugle said that he would like to see the pardon and parole board "have seven members instead of five and he's going to work during the next legislative session" toward that goal.

In 2024, McDugle said he "believes that members of the Oklahoma District Attorneys Council had improper communications with the Oklahoma Pardon and Parole Board prior to Richard Glossip's clemency hearing in April 2023." District Attorney Jason Hicks criticized Attorney General Getner Drummond for sharing his views on the case. In other communications revealed, district attorneys referred to Drummond as a “douche” and "complained among themselves that the attorney general had turned Glossip's clemency hearing into a 'circus'" and accused Drummond of vying for a run for governor.

In 2024, McDugle voted against HB 3329 which still passed the house floor. It is intended to provide free menstrual products in school bathrooms.
