= Julius Jones (prisoner) =

American prisoner (born 1980)

- 2018 mugshot of Julius Jones
- Born: Julius Darius Jones; July 25, 1980 (age 46); Oklahoma, U.S.
- Education: University of Oklahoma
- Status: Incarcerated
- Conviction: First-degree murder
- Penalty: Death (2002; commuted); Life imprisonment without the possibility of parole (2021)

Details
- Victims: Paul Scott Howell, 45
- Date: July 28, 1999
- Locations: Edmond, Oklahoma, U.S.
- Weapon: Raven .25ACP Pistol
- Imprisoned at: Joseph Harp Correctional Center

Julius Darius Jones (born July 25, 1980) is an American former death row inmate from Oklahoma who was convicted of the July 1999 murder of Paul Howell. His case has received international attention due to claims of innocence and controversy surrounding his trial and conviction. Jones was convicted of the crime on the basis of what the Oklahoma Court of Criminal Appeals later characterized as an "overwhelming" body of evidence consisting of "a co-defendant who directly implicated Jones, eyewitness identification, incriminating statements made by Jones after the crime, flight from police, damning physical evidence hidden in Jones's parents' home, and an interlocking web of other physical and testimonial evidence consistent with the State's theory."

Jones and his defense team maintain that he was at home with his family at the time of the murder and that his co-defendant Christopher Jordan is the true perpetrator of the crime, contending that eyewitness descriptions of the killer better describe Jordan than Jones, and noting that three jailhouse informants have said that they have heard Jordan confess to the shooting.

Jones was scheduled to be executed on November 18, 2021. However, four hours before his scheduled execution, Oklahoma Governor Kevin Stitt commuted his sentence to life imprisonment without parole.

== Early life ==
Jones was born to Madeline Davis-Jones on July 25, 1980, in Oklahoma. He was the second of three siblings and has one younger sister, Antoinette, and one older brother, Antonio. He attended John Marshall High School in Oklahoma City, where he played basketball and football, and graduated in 1998 with a 3.8 grade point average, 11th in his class. Blake and Taylor Griffin's father coached Jones and his friend, Christopher Jordan, who later became his co-defendant in the 1999 crime. Jones has said that he knew Jordan was not a good influence, but wanted to help him.

Jones won a partial academic scholarship to the University of Oklahoma but withdrew during his second semester. Jones' family was not in poverty, but Jones committed several acts of larceny and petty theft, which he says he committed in order to obtain things his family could not afford. At the time of the murder of Paul Howell, Jones had prior convictions, based upon guilty pleas, to unlawful use of a fictitious name, false declaration to a pawnbroker, concealing stolen property, and larceny from a retailer. Jones had used the name and birth certificate of another man named Lewis Wayne Richardson to apply for an Oklahoma identification card on September 30, 1998. Jones admitted to stealing four pagers from a Target store on December 9, 1998, that he had concealed a compact disc player he had stolen the same day from a Walmart store, and that he had lied about having ownership of the stolen property for two months when he tried to pawn it. The State also presented evidence at his trial of various unadjudicated acts which included attempting to elude a police officer, unauthorized use of a motor vehicle and possession of a firearm during the commission of a felony, armed robbery of a jewelry store at Quail Springs Mall, two armed carjackings in July 1999 at the Hideaway Pizza, and a physical altercation with a detention officer. In 2006, Jones pleaded guilty to Robbery with Firearms and Possession of a Firearm After Felony Conviction for a carjacking he committed on July 22, 1999.

A photograph of Jones taken about a week before the murder shows him with short, close-cropped hair.

== Crime ==
Paul Scott Howell, a 45-year-old insurance executive, spent the evening of July 28, 1999, shopping for school supplies and eating ice cream with his two daughters, aged 7 and 9, and his sister, Megan Tobey. At about 9:30 p.m., Howell pulled into the driveway of his parents' home in Edmond, Oklahoma, where he was living after separating from his wife several months earlier, in his 1997 GMC Suburban. As Tobey exited the passenger side of the vehicle, she heard a gunshot. Tobey turned to face her brother and saw a young black male, who wore a white T-shirt, a red bandana over his face, and a black stocking cap on his head, standing beside the vehicle's open driver's side door. The man demanded that Howell give him the keys to the vehicle. Tobey pulled the two children out of the back seat and ran with them through her parents' carport. As they ran, she heard someone yelling at her to stop, and a second gunshot. The murderer then left in Howell's Suburban. Howell's parents ran outside and found their son lying in the driveway. Howell was taken to a hospital and pronounced dead at 1:45 a.m. The state medical examiner later testified at Jones' trial that Howell died of "a single contact wound," a wound where the gun was pressed against his head when it was fired.

=== Investigation ===
Two days after the shooting, Oklahoma City police found Howell's Suburban parked near a convenience store on the south side of town. Officers canvassed the area to determine who left it there and spoke with Kermit Lottie, who owned an auto body shop four blocks from where the vehicle was found. Lottie told police that a man he identified as "Day Day" and another man whom he did not know had tried to sell him the Suburban the day before, but he refused to buy it. Lottie provided police with Day Day's business card, which bore his legal name, Ladell King, and his contact information.

Police went to King's apartment and found only King's girlfriend, Vickson McDonald, at home. At officers' request, she called King and told him the police were there and would like to speak to him. King went home and provided officers with information about the Paul Howell murder. King told police that he had agreed to help Jones and his friend Christopher Jordan find a buyer for a stolen vehicle. On the night of the murder, Jordan had come to King's apartment driving his own 1972 Oldsmobile Cutlass, and Jones had arrived fifteen or twenty minutes later driving Howell's Suburban, and wearing a white T-shirt, a red bandana, a stocking cap, and gloves. Jones warned King not to touch the Suburban and asked him to find someone to buy it. King's neighbor saw Jones and King checking out the Suburban that night. While King was speaking with police, he received a page from Julius Jones and provided police with the phone number, which traced back to Jones' parents' house.

Police drove to Jones' parents' house at about 4:15 p.m., with King accompanying them and directing them to the residence. An officer called the number supplied by King, and Jones answered. The officer told Jones that the Oklahoma City Police Department had surrounded the house and wanted to talk to him about Howell's murder. Jones agreed to come out and talk, but instead left the house through a second-floor window, evaded officers attempting to secure the perimeter of the house, and fled. Officers obtained warrants to arrest Jones and search his parents' home for evidence. Jones' father, Anthony, said that in the course of the search, officers tore doors off their hinges, broke windows, stepped in boxes full of family photos—tearing some—and dumped out boxes of cereal, methods which a police sergeant stated were routine and necessary to find crucial evidence in a murder investigation. In Jones' bedroom, detectives discovered a white T-shirt with black trim and a black stocking cap. At about 1:00 a.m., officers also found a chrome-plated Raven .25-caliber semiautomatic pistol wrapped in a red bandana and hidden in the attic space above the ceiling of the closet in the room Jones shared with his brother, and hidden behind the cover of the doorbell chime, officers discovered a .25-caliber magazine for the gun they had just found capable of holding seven bullets, and loaded with five bullets. The gun was consistent with King's description of a gun King said Jones habitually carried for self-defense.

Christopher Jordan was arrested on the evening of July 30, and Jones was arrested at a friend's apartment at about 6:15 a.m. on July 31. According to Jones, the officer who arrested him called him a "nigger" and dared him to run, implying the officer would shoot him if he did. The two men were charged conjointly with conspiracy to commit a felony (the theft of the Suburban) and first-degree murder. Jones was also charged with being a felon in possession of a firearm.

== Legal proceedings ==
=== Trial ===
==== Guilt phase ====
Christopher O'Neal Jordan, Jones' co-defendant, pleaded guilty on October 11, 2001 and agreed to testify against Jones. He was given a life sentence of which all but 30 years were suspended for first-degree murder, and a sentence of 10 years for the conspiracy charge, to be served concurrently. Jones' trial was held February 11–15, 19–22, 25–28, and March 1–4, 2002, with Judge Jerry D. Bass presiding.

Opening statements were made on February 14. Prosecutor Sandra Elliott said that Jones and Jordan had been looking for a Suburban with the keys because they believed they could sell it for about $5,000, and "Paul Howell was murdered simply because he had a car they wanted." Public defender Malcolm Savage said the evidence would show that Christopher Jordan's story wasn't believable, and that Jordan, not Jones, shot Howell.

Howell's sister, Megan Tobey testified that day that she grabbed her nieces from the back seat as she heard a gunshot and someone repeating twice, "where are the keys?" She said a second gunshot was fired at herself and her nieces as they fled. Tobey testified that the gunman's cap came down to about 0.5–1 inch (15–25 mm) above his ears, and she could see hair on the sides of his head. She also testified that she did not see braids or cornrows, which was how Christopher Jordan wore his hair. Howell's father, William Dean Howell, Sr., also testified about what he had witnessed on the night of the murder.

Ladell King testified on February 15 that within 30 minutes after the murder, he saw Jones back the stolen Suburban into a parking space at his apartment complex in northwest Oklahoma City. King said that Jones asked him about calling someone who might buy the vehicle, describing himself as "the middle man." King said Jones was wearing a white T-shirt, a red bandana, and black cotton gloves. Ladell King's girlfriend, Vickson McDonald, testified that she had also seen Jones arrive that night in the Suburban. King's neighbor, Gordon Owens, was also standing outside that night and confirmed that he saw Julius Jones, whom he had met before, standing next to the Suburban talking to King and gesturing towards the vehicle. King testified that the following afternoon, he picked up Jones from his home in his Pontiac Firebird and brought him back to his apartment, where the Suburban had been left overnight. With Jones driving the Suburban and King following in the Firebird, the two went to south Oklahoma City to see Kermit Lottie about buying the vehicle. Because King knew that Lottie did not permit people to bring stolen vehicles directly into his shop, they parked the vehicle at a convenience store called Central Grocery. The jury was shown surveillance video from the store which showed King and Jones entering the business that day. Leaving the Suburban parked outside Central Grocery, both rode to Lottie's shop in the Firebird. King testified that "Kermit said he didn't want it because a body was attached to it," since Lottie had heard on a news broadcast that someone was killed for a Suburban. Around 5:30 p.m., King and Jones drove to the gym where Christopher Jordan was playing basketball and told him they had been trying to page him all day, and King and Jordan played basketball for a while. King testified that later that night, Jones and Jordan arrived at his apartment together in Jordan's Cutlass at about 11:00 p.m., and they discussed the murder of Paul Howell and what to do with the Suburban. King said that Jones admitted to the shooting, saying, "He said the car pulls up. He saw a little girl waving at him. The door came open and the gun went off." King testified that the next day, Jones called him and talked to him about a police reward for information leading to the arrest of Howell's killer. King testified, "he said he was worth $22,000 and it won't be long." King said that Jones asked if King was going to turn him in, and called himself "a fool for telling [him] I shot the man." King testified that Jones wore his hair in a "low cut" and did not cut his hair between the robbery and his arrest, so that photographs from the time of the arrest which were shown to the jury showed him as he appeared on the night of July 28, 1999.

Jordan testified on February 21 that on the day of the shooting, he and Jones went cruising around a suburb of Oklahoma City in Jordan's Oldsmobile Cutlass, looking for a Suburban to steal because they knew it was easier to sell stolen American-made vehicles. Jordan drove, while Jones rode in the passenger seat. After deciding against stealing several other Suburbans, the two spotted Howell's in the drive-through of a local Braum's ice cream shop. Jordan said they first planned to rob Howell in the parking lot of the ice cream shop, but too many people were around. They then followed the Suburban to Howell's parents' home, where Jones got out of the Cutlass to steal the Suburban at gunpoint. Jordan heard a gunshot and ran to where he could see Howell slumped on the ground. Jordan said, "I heard a gunshot. Five seconds after, I heard another gunshot. I never saw Julius pull the trigger. I just saw him (Howell) on the ground." Jordan said he did not know Howell had been shot while he was at the scene. He then saw Jones patting Howell as if looking for the Suburban's keys. The two then left the scene and drove to Ladell King's apartment. Jordan testified that he and Jones drove from King's apartment to the home of his brother, Laymon Jordan, on the south side of town, and there, Jones told him about the robbery. Jordan said Jones told him "that he was hiding behind a tree and as he came out of the tree a little girl waved to him and said hi," and that is when he claimed the gun went off "on accident." The next morning, Jordan dropped Jones off at his parents' house, and Jordan drove to his grandmother's house, where he was staying at the time.

Ballistics evidence admitted at trial indicated that the bullet removed from Howell's head and a bullet fired into the dashboard of the Suburban were both fired from the handgun found in the attic of the Jones home. Jones' girlfriend, Analiese Presley, testified that Jones had told her prior to Howell's murder that he had a .25 caliber chrome semi-automatic pistol which he kept for protection, and that she had seen such a pistol in his possession in the summer of 1999. She testified that Jones told her that at the time Howell was murdered, he had been somewhere on the south side of Oklahoma City. Presley also testified that at the time, Jones' hair had been "really short."

Neither Jones nor any other defense witness testified in the guilt phase of the trial. Jones' defense team theorized that he had taken no part in the theft of the Suburban before he drove it to the convenience store the day after the murder.

In her closing argument, Elliott told the jurors to consider the forensic evidence, including the fact that the murder weapon was found in Jones' home, and a box of ammunition for that gun was found in Jones' car at a transmission shop. Jones' lead counsel, David McKenzie, called jurors' attention to the fact that Jordan had admitted to previously lying to police and to his own attorneys to protect himself, and said that Jordan had received a "sweetheart deal" from the prosecution in exchange for his testimony. Elliott said that Howell was not given a chance to give up his vehicle, that he would have voluntarily acquiesced in the theft if asked, and that he did not have to die for it. Interpreting Megan Tobey's testimony to mean that the killer had hair which was at least half an inch long, McKenzie argued, "[if] Mr. Jordan had a bandanna on and a stocking cap around his head ... his hair would stick out. It would have to. There is no way, no possible way, that the hair on Julius Jones' head would stick out half an inch. It's physically impossible."

On February 25, after deliberating for three hours and fifteen minutes, the jury found Jones guilty of first-degree murder (Count 1), possession of a firearm after conviction of a felony (Count 2), and conspiracy to commit a felony (Count 3).

==== Punishment phase ====
Anand Lapsi testified that after dinner at the Hideaway Pizza on the night of July 22, 1999, he had gone to his new Mercedes-Benz in the parking lot, where a man wearing a blue bandana over the lower half of his face held a gun to his head and said, "give me the keys. Give me the keys." Lapsi positively identified Jones as the man who robbed him. Police later found the car in the parking lot of Jones' apartment with all of the owner's personal effects missing, and located the keys to the car in the Cutlass shared by Jones and Jordan.

Vernon Hofmann testified that his car had been stolen at gunpoint at the same location the night before Lapsi's. Hofmann went to his Lexus after leaving the restaurant with two friends. The two friends were already seated in the car when a man wearing a blue and white bandana and gloves pressed a gun to Hofmann's head and told him to "get in and drive." When Hofmann didn't move, the robber took the keys from him, shoved him into the back seat, and began to drive. Hofmann yelled for his friends to "run for your lives," and the three men were able to jump from the moving vehicle. Hofmann could not identify the robber, but Jordan testified that he had driven Jones to the restaurant and witnessed the robbery. Annaliese Presley testified that Jones had called her and told her that he had a Lexus and she would "look cute in it." She assumed Jones had stolen the Lexus because he couldn't afford that kind of car. According to Christopher Jordan, Jones quickly sold the Lexus to an individual near Rose State College in Midwest City for $4,000. Police later recovered the vehicle in Midwest City with all of the owner's personal effects missing.

Mark Merchant, the owner of Royal Jewelers at Quail Springs Mall, testified that on July 9, 1999, a black man wearing a red bandana and a stocking cap had put a gun to his head and robbed him of 30 to 40 gold chains valued at $15,000. Merchant could not identify the masked robber, but Christopher Jordan testified that Jones had taken the Cutlass on the day of the robbery and come back with gold chains, stating that he had robbed a jewelry store at Quail Springs Mall. According to Jordan, Jones pawned many of the chains, wore one, and gave another to Presley. Presley confirmed that Jones gave her three or four gold chains but then took them back, and pawn slips record that Jones sold several gold chains in July 1999.

On February 27, a juror informed the judge that she had heard an inappropriate comment made by another juror. She reported to the judge that in the presence of approximately eight to ten other jurors, a juror had "made a comment that they should place him in a box in the ground for what he has done," and that others were probably able to hear it. She said, "they should put him in a box and put him in the ground after this is all over for what he's done" was "a direct quote" to the best of her recollection. She expressed her concern that "we are not supposed to be deliberating yet at this point and I just—I felt that may influence somebody or his opinion is not important right now." The next morning, Judge Bass closed the courtroom to the public while he investigated the matter. He asked each juror whether they had heard anyone else express an opinion as to the appropriate punishment, and none had heard what had been reported. The juror reported to have said this did not remember making any such statement, but was not positive that he had not. The juror who had reported the remark then admitted it was possible that the part of the conversation she had overheard was not related to the trial.

When testimony resumed on February 28, Howell's parents, sister, and two brothers gave victim impact statements. Tobey told the jury, "I can't get the vision of my brother, Paul, on the ground with my mother over him—I wake up with it. I go to sleep with it. There is nothing I can do to get it out of my mind." Howell's mother, Dorothy, said, "our lives were torn apart that evening," and that she and her husband suffered panic attacks. Howell's father said he experienced anxiety, depression, and high blood pressure, and that "sleep is one of the luxuries I had to give up."

The defense argued that Jones' life should be spared because he has an injury to the portion of his brain necessary for impulse control and understanding of consequences. Dr. Stephen Carella, a neuropsychologist, testified for the defense, describing Jones as a "very bright young man and overachiever" with an IQ of 97. Carella said he discovered a mild problem in the left hemisphere of Jones' brain which could be attributed to being hit in the head with a baseball when he was 12, or to a May 5, 1998 traffic accident.

Prosecutor Suzanne Lister Gump again suggested to jurors on March 4 that Howell would have acquiesced in the theft of his vehicle if given the opportunity. In describing how the victim was killed, Gump stated Jones held the gun to Howell's head while simultaneously pointing her finger at a juror's head, as if demonstrating a gun pointed towards the juror's head. The defense objected to this demonstration, and the prosecutor continued the demonstration using co-counsel as the victim. Gump said that Jones shot and killed Howell "in front of his children and his sister. He left him to die in his parents' front yard." Gump argued that the defendant's age did not reduce his level of blame, that he was equally morally culpable for the killing whether or not it was premeditated, that the defendant's background of high school, Sunday school, and work experience did not extend the manner in which and the reason for which Paul Howell was killed, and that the aggravating circumstances far outweighed any mitigation offered by the defense. Gump read jurors a letter from Howell's older daughter, Rachel, in which she wrote, "he would always sing a song or make up a poem. I love him." The victim's younger daughter, Abby, referred to her father's murder in a school assignment when she was assigned to write a poem about silence, writing, "In silence. I remember a picture of my dad who died when I was seven. I remember his voice in the silence. I picture his smiling face. But now he's up in heaven. That's a good place to be."

The jury deliberated for four hours and twenty minutes before giving sentencing recommendations on the night of March 4. On Count 1, the jury found the existence of two aggravating circumstances: the defendant created a great risk of death to more than one person, and there existed the probability that the defendant would commit criminal acts of violence that would constitute a continuing threat to society. The jury fixed punishment at death on Count 1, 15 years imprisonment on Count 2, and 25 years imprisonment on Count 3. Howell's father commented that "I knew deep down in my heart, it would be all right," but "nothing has changed. This won't ever bring Paul back."

Formal sentencing was held on April 19, 2002. Bass sentenced Jones in accordance with the jury's verdicts and ordered the sentences be served consecutively. Jones' parents commented after the sentencing that "he's innocent," and "they didn't prove nothing." David McKenzie opined that "in a death-penalty case of a black man accused of killing a rich white guy, I don't think there is any possible way you could have gotten a fair trial in Oklahoma County. I think the verdict proved it." District Attorney Wes Lane commented that "we don't pursue the prosecution of cases in which we believe someone is innocent" and that he was "sorry that the lawyers for Julius Jones have decided to take out their disappointment on honest, hard-working jurors who did their best to come to the verdict they believe in." Jerome Holmes, deputy criminal chief in the U.S. attorney's office for the Western District of Oklahoma, wrote a newspaper editorial saying that McKenzie's comments "are not supported by facts" and that "factually unsupported claims of juror racial bias impose significant costs on the criminal justice system." While acknowledging that "racial prejudice still exists in the jury box" and "as an African-American, I am among the first to condemn it," Holmes wrote that "the flawed notion that in order to give a racial minority defendant a fair trial we must gerrymander particular jury panels to ensure that a portion of the jury seated for the trial bears the same racial markers as the defendant ... is antithetical to the concepts of individual freedom that are a hallmark of our great nation; it suggests that, even as to weighty matters involving the liberty or the very life of another, our choices will be regularly controlled by some ill-defined allegiance to the racial groups to which we belong. In 21st century America, there is no room for such thinking, and it should not be strengthened by ill-advised unsupported claims of juror racial bias."

=== Direct appeal ===
==== Jury ====
Jones appealed his conviction to the Oklahoma Court of Criminal Appeals (OCCA). Jones alleged that he was deprived of his right to a fair and impartial jury by the trial court's method of jury selection. The OCCA held that the "struck juror" method was consistent with the law and did not prejudice Jones, as he was afforded the opportunity to question prospective jurors and was allowed to exercise all of his peremptory challenges provided for by law. Jones also challenged the trial court's decision to remove a juror because he stated that he would not consider voting for the death penalty under any circumstances. Jones alleged that this person was intentionally trying to avoid jury service, and the court was bound to give his counsel an opportunity to rehabilitate the juror. The OCCA found that the prospective juror's responses were sufficient for the trial court to dismiss him for cause and it is not error for trial counsel to be denied an opportunity to rehabilitate a juror.

Jones also alleged the jury had been subject to improper influences which deprived him of his right to a fair trial. During first stage proceedings, three jurors received potentially threatening or hang up telephone calls, one juror's home was burglarized, and the codefendant's attorney exchanged a hand-shake greeting with one of the jurors. During second stage proceedings, two jurors allegedly engaged in premature deliberations. The OCCA found no evidence that these incidents had affected the jury's ability to be fair and impartial. Two jurors told the trial court that they had close friends or family members who had been killed in violent crimes; Jones' counsel did not challenge these jurors for cause, and the OCCA would not find that their past experiences rendered the sentencing fundamentally unfair or arbitrary. While eleven out of the twelve jurors at the trial were white, the OCCA found no evidence that race played any role in the jury's sentencing determination. The OCCA rejected Jones' allegation that the trial court's jury instructions unfairly prejudiced him, finding that the jury instructions as a whole accurately stated the applicable law, and any inadvertent omissions were harmless.

==== Admissibility and sufficiency of evidence ====
Jones alleged that the evidence obtained from his parents' home should have been suppressed, arguing that the information in the affidavit for the search warrant was insufficient to establish probable cause. The OCCA held that the affidavit did not need to contain further information to establish the accuracy of the statement made by Ladell King because King was named as the person who gave the information, and the information in the affidavit was sufficient to establish a probability that evidence would be found in the home, because the home of a person suspected of a crime is a natural place for that person to have hidden evidence.

Jones also challenged the validity of the search warrant because the issuing magistrate authorized the search to be made at any time, without making findings of a likelihood the property named in the search warrant will be destroyed, moved or concealed, as required by Oklahoma law for a search warrant to be served between the hours of 10:00 p.m. and 6:00 a.m. The OCCA affirmed the trial court's finding that this issue was moot, as the warrant was in fact served at 9:30 p.m. Jones also claimed ineffectiveness of counsel for his counsel's failure to demand a Franks hearing on whether police knowingly or with reckless disregard for the truth included false or misleading statements in the affidavit. Jones argued that because his father had told the police at about 4:30 p.m. that he was not in the home, the police should have informed the magistrate that they knew Jones had left the home when the affidavit was presented at about 7:00 p.m. The OCCA held the alleged inaccuracy to be irrelevant, because even if Jones' parents claim had been included in the affidavit, a substantial basis for the warrant would still have existed and it would likely have been issued.

Jones argued that because Jordan and King were both accomplices to the crime, the jury should not have been allowed to consider their testimony unless it was corroborated. The OCCA rejected the claim that the record showed King to have been an accomplice to the crime, and found Jordan's testimony sufficiently corroborated by King and other witnesses. In view of the rejection of Jones' arguments against the admissibility of the physical evidence recovered during the search and the testimony of Jordan and King, the OCCA also rejected Jones' claims that there was insufficient evidence for a rational trier of fact to find him guilty of the charges beyond a reasonable doubt.

The OCCA found that Jones was not unfairly prejudiced by non-police witnesses' use of the word "carjacking" instead of "robbery," or by testimony about gang violence, gang investigations, and the prevalence of gangs in the area where the Suburban was found, and that the trial court's admonishment of the jury was sufficient to cure any error arising from statements which were the object of sustained objections during the trial. Jones also alleged that Ladell King's testimony that Jordan and Jones had told him they had a "hookup" on some cars and asked if he knew anyone who would buy them improperly introduced other crimes evidence. The OCCA affirmed the trial court's finding that this testimony was res gestae, and its probative value was not outweighed by the danger of unfair prejudice.

==== Brady violations ====
Jones alleged that he had been deprived of due process by the State's failure to make a Brady disclosure of material evidence, or in the alternative, that he had been prejudiced by ineffectiveness of counsel for his counsel's failure to discover this evidence. The OCCA held that evidence relating to criminal charges against Lottie and King was impeachment evidence which should have been disclosed to Jones prior to trial, but he was not prejudiced by its untimely disclosure because the additional criminal charges were discovered during the trial and King and Lottie were recalled to testify about most of the other charges.

Jones also alleged a Brady violation for the failure to disclose a letter from an Edmond Police detective to a federal prosecutor which read, "If Kermit [Lottie] had not cooperated with my investigation I believe the homicide would be unsolved to this day. Thus, I am writing you due to a request from Kermit to help him in his upcoming sentencing hearing. If there is anything that you can do to help Kermit I would appreciate it." This letter, although written over a year before the trial, was not discovered until shortly after the trial. The OCCA could not find that the use of this letter as impeachment evidence would have likely influenced the outcome of the trial, as the jury knew Lottie had federal charges against him for which he would be sentenced and knew that a motion for continuance had been filed in the federal trial because of his role as a witness in Jones' case. The OCCA shared the trial court's view that the consistency of Lottie's testimony before and after the federal charges were filed demonstrated his testimony was unaffected by what he thought would or would not happen to him at his federal sentencing, and found that the letter was not material on the grounds that even if Lottie's testimony had not been admitted at all, "the evidence presented against Jones was overwhelming."

Jones also argued that evidence that cigarettes found in the Suburban belonged to a friend of Howell should have been disclosed prior to trial and was not. As a result, defense counsel attempted to demonstrate that the cigarettes belonged to Ladell King. Jones contended that the lack of timely disclosure of the ownership of the cigarettes unfairly undermined the credibility of the defense by causing them to waste time on a non-issue. The OCCA found that this information was not material. The State did not use the cigarettes as evidence linking Jones to the crime, and who owned them was a non-issue. The OCCA concluded that the cumulative effect of the Brady violations did not raise a reasonable probability sufficient to undermine confidence in the outcome of the trial.

==== Confrontation of witnesses ====
FBI examiner Kathleen Lundy testified at trial that all the bullets recovered as physical evidence in the case were "analytically indistinguishable and chemically the same" and would have come from the same source of lead at Remington. She also admitted that there were likely over three million other boxes of ammunition with the same chemical composition. Over a year after Jones' trial concluded, Lundy, no longer employed with the FBI, pled guilty to a misdemeanor count of false swearing in Kentucky relating to expert testimony on bullet lead composition which she gave in a pretrial hearing shortly before Jones' trial. Jones argued his counsel's inability to confront Lundy with this prior perjurious testimony constituted a due process violation. The OCCA found that Jones' confrontation and due process rights were not "violated by something that had not occurred at the time of his trial", and that the inability to cross-examine Lundy on this claim was not prejudicial because "Lundy's testimony was not highly compelling, particularly when one considers her admission that over three million boxes of ammunition would have the same chemical makeup, and the other strong evidence—particularly the tool-mark evidence showing the recovered bullets were all fired from the same gun—which was admitted at trial."

Jones alleged that his counsel unilaterally waived Jones' right to be present at various hearings in the course of the trial, depriving him of due process. The OCCA found that Jones was present at all critical stages of the trial, and did not have an absolute right to be present at all proceedings, independent of the bearing his presence would have on his opportunity to defend himself. The OCCA found that Jones had not shown how his presence was necessary at these hearings, or how his absence had prejudiced his ability to defend himself.

==== Double jeopardy ====
Jones argued that his conviction of both robbery-murder and conspiracy to commit robbery constituted double jeopardy. The OCCA found that these were separate and distinct crimes, as Jones had already completed the conspiracy to commit a felony by plotting with Jordan to steal a Suburban and following Howell from the ice cream shop before committing the robbery-murder.

==== Trial errors and prosecutorial misconduct ====
Jones complained that he was deprived of a fair trial by various incidents of error and prosecutorial misconduct during the trial which included "improper display of emotion, improper personal opinion, misstating evidence, misleading comments, arguing guilt by association, speculation, going outside record, inflammatory demonstration, arguing that Jones committed unadjudicated crimes without a reliable basis, evoking emotional response, misstatement of applicable law and improper argument." The OCCA found no plain error in any of these incidents that were not objected to during the trial, and found that any error which might have arisen from those which were objected to during the trial had been cured with instructions or admonishments from the court. The OCCA held that the demonstration in which the prosecutor pointed her finger at someone's head as if it were a gun was based upon the evidence, and while the involvement of the juror "cannot be condoned," it still "was not so egregious as to elicit an emotional response rather than a rational judgment from the juror or the jury and it was not so prejudicial as to deprive Jones of a fair sentencing proceeding."

==== Ineffective assistance of counsel ====
Jones claimed that he had been prejudiced by ineffective assistance of counsel. The OCCA rejected Jones' claim that his counsel had rendered deficient performance by advising him not to testify, as Jones presented no evidence that his counsel prevented him from testifying by force, threat, or deceit, nor did he explain what information he would have testified to that might have changed the outcome of the case.

Jones also alleged ineffective assistance because his counsel did not call potential alibi witnesses. Although Jones' father, mother, brother, and sister were prepared to swear that he was at home with them at the time of the murder, the defense did not bring up this alibi during the trial. At an evidentiary hearing, Jones' family testified that he had been home with them from approximately 4:00 or 5:00 p.m. to at least 10:30 p.m. on the night of the murder, and that another witness, Brenda Cudjoe, had also been present with her son until 9:00 or 9:30 p.m. and could corroborate this alibi. Cudjoe had told a defense investigator that this was not true, and testified at the evidentiary hearing that she was not at the Joneses' home on the night of the murder. Cudjoe's son did not testify, but provided an affidavit confirming that he and his mother had not been at Jones' home that night. David McKenzie and Malcolm Savage both testified that Jones also repeatedly told them his family was mistaken and he was not at home on the night of the murder; Jones and Cudjoe agreed that the night they were both present at the house was the night before the date of the murder. Jones did not testify at this hearing, or deny telling his counsel that his family's version of events was wrong. Jones' lead trial counsel, McKenzie, testified to his concerns at the time of the trial that if he elicited the family's testimony to this alibi, it would be soundly impeached, thereby ruining any credibility they might have in the punishment phase of the trial. The OCCA also noted that the defense had elicited testimony at trial from Jones' girlfriend that Jones claimed to have been somewhere on the south side of Oklahoma City—i.e., not at his parents' home—at the time of the murder, and found that to choose not to present evidence of a conflicting alibi was a sound trial strategy within the competence of counsel's professional judgment.

Jones also argued he had been prejudiced by ineffective assistance due to his counsel's failure to call Emmanuel Littlejohn as a witness. Littlejohn was a convicted murderer who briefly shared a cell with Christopher Jordan while awaiting resentencing in his own murder trial. Littlejohn was prepared to testify that Jordan said to him, "Julius didn't do it" and "Julius wasn't there," that Jordan had confessed "that [Jordan] had wrapped the gun used to commit the murder in his case in a bandana and hidden it in Julius Jones' house," and that Jordan "felt guilty because he was going to implicate his co-defendant, Julius Jones, in a murder case to avoid getting the death penalty." The OCCA dismissed this claim of ineffective assistance, finding that as Littlejohn had little credibility as a witness, and it would have been "somewhat difficult for the jury to believe" that Jordan could have hidden evidence in the Joneses' attic without their knowledge, forgoing Littlejohn's assistance was also a sound trial strategy.

The OCCA also rejected Jones' claim that he had suffered ineffective assistance from his counsel's failure to more thoroughly cross-examine Christopher Jordan. The OCCA found that counsel did cross-examine Jordan at length, highlighting inconsistencies in his story and eliciting admissions that details he had previously given to police and his own attorney were false, and that he had lied about the case to help himself out. Counsel also cross-examined Jordan about his plea agreement and how he stood to gain from helping the State convict Jones. The OCCA found this cross-examination to be in conformance with reasonable standards of professional performance. The OCCA rejected other allegations by Jones of ineffective assistance by his counsel, as well as his claim that his entire trial defense team as a whole was unqualified to try a capital case, for reasons the OCCA said would imply "that counsel who has not been out of law school for a certain number of years, tried a certain number of capital cases, spent a certain number of hours preparing for a capital trial, etc., is per se unable to render effective assistance to a capital defendant."

==== Sentencing issues ====
The OCCA declined to reconsider case law affirming the constitutionality of treating the probability of a continuing threat to society as an aggravating circumstance, and of using unadjudicated acts as evidence in support of this aggravator. Jones argued that his conviction for larceny from a retailer was void because it should have been adjudicated through the juvenile system given his age at the time, and his counsel's failure to object was ineffective assistance. The OCCA held that even if that were true, the admission of this evidence in support of the aggravator was harmless given the other strong evidence of a continuing threat. Jones also complained that the testimony of his co-defendant was used to introduce the evidence of the jewelry store and Hideaway Pizza robberies and was not sufficiently corroborated. The OCCA found that the Oklahoma law requiring corroboration of accomplice testimony did not apply in the punishment phase of a trial, and yet the State did corroborate it with the testimony of Lapsi, Hofmann, and Merchant, and it was the jury's job to assess the weight of the evidence and the credibility of the witnesses. The OCCA found the evidence of the callous nature of the Howell murder and Jones' disregard for human life, together with the evidence that Jones had taken property by force and at gunpoint on at least three other occasions, sufficient to support the continuing threat aggravator.

Jones also claimed the State had not sufficiently supported the aggravating circumstance of a great risk of death to another person or persons. The OCCA concluded that because the evidence indicated that after killing Howell, Jones had yelled at Tobey and the children and fired another shot, the State had presented sufficient evidence that Jones caused them a great risk of death, even though they were not injured. The OCCA also rejected Jones' claim that he had been unfairly prejudiced because the victim impact testimony presented in the sentencing phase unduly emphasized the emotional impact of the crime on the Howell family. The OCCA also declined Jones' request to hold an evidentiary hearing on the cost-effectiveness of the death penalty as a matter of public policy and its value as a deterrent.

==== Eighth Amendment claims ====
Jones also argued that his death sentence violated the Eighth Amendment's prohibition of cruel and unusual punishment, because the killing of Howell was an accident and not the type of crime that warranted the death penalty. The OCCA stated that the jury had considered the State's evidence of aggravating factors and determined that Jones' conduct did warrant the death penalty. The OCCA declined to reconsider case law holding that the jury was not required to consider whether mitigating factors outweighed aggravating factors by beyond a reasonable doubt, or to find that Oklahoma's method of lethal injection constituted cruel and unusual punishment.

==== Appeals ====
Jones petitioned the OCCA for rehearing on February 16, 2006, arguing that the court had not applied the proper standard of review to the sufficiency of evidence in support of the aggravating circumstances; that the court had failed to address his claim that the State had improperly relied on his non-violent felony convictions to support the continuing threat aggravator; and that the court's resolution of his claim for ineffective assistance on account of McKenzie's failure to call his family as alibi witnesses was in conflict with the precedent of Chambers v. Mississippi. The OCCA granted rehearing but denied relief on March 14, 2006, concluding with respect to these arguments that the different standard of review would not have resulted in a different conclusion about the existence of the aggravating circumstances; that Jones had waived his claim on the use of the non-violent convictions by failing to develop this argument in his initial petition, and even if he had, the use of these convictions would not have prejudiced him given the other evidence presented of violent crimes he had committed; and that Jones' reliance on Chambers was inapposite, as his accusation that his counsel had "wholly failed" to present defense evidence was "simply wrong," and he and his counsel had received and exercised a "fair opportunity to defend against the State's accusations." The Supreme Court of the United States declined to review the OCCA's decision on October 10, 2006.

=== First application for post-conviction relief ===
Jones filed an application for post-conviction relief on February 25, 2005, which was denied by the OCCA in an unpublished opinion on November 5, 2007. Jones claimed ineffective assistance of trial counsel for McKenzie's failure to investigate whether anyone could corroborate Littlejohn's claim that Jordan had confessed to the murder. Jones submitted affidavits from Littlejohn and from Christopher Berry, an inmate who at the time of the trial was being held in the Oklahoma County Jail on a charge of Child Abuse Murder, whom McKenzie also represented. Berry's affidavit stated that he met Christopher Jordan in the Oklahoma County Jail, where they were housed in the same area of the jail for about two years, and that he overheard Jordan tell an inmate named "Smoke" that "[Jordan] was the actual person who shot the victim in his case," and that "because [Jordan] was the first to talk to the police, he was getting a deal and would not get the death penalty" while "his partner in the case was charged with capital murder." According to Berry, Jordan liked to brag about shooting Howell. Berry admitted that he "didn't tell [his] attorney, David McKenzie," about this, but stated that he "did try to talk to him about it," and "Mr. McKenzie didn't seem interested in it." The OCCA rejected Jones' claim of ineffective assistance of counsel, holding that "Berry suffer[ed] from the same credibility problems that Littlejohn did" and that his statements did not necessarily corroborate Littlejohn's. The OCCA interpreted Berry's claim that Jordan had called Jones "his partner in the case" to mean Jordan had said Jones was involved in the theft of the Suburban but did not shoot Howell, which would conflict with Littlejohn's claim that Jordan had said Jones was not involved in the robbery at all, although Jones argues he might have been called Jordan's "partner" only in the sense that they were charged together. Jones' public defender at the time, David McKenzie, later concurred with Jones that he had given ineffective counsel in a 2008 affidavit and detailed five major failures he made in Jones' trial.

Jones also claimed he had suffered ineffective assistance of appellate counsel in his direct appeal, because his counsel had failed to thoroughly investigate the jurors' backgrounds. During voir dire, the trial court asked if any of the panel had appeared in a court of law under any circumstances as a witness, plaintiff, or defendant. Juror Whitmire's answer was "[t]raffic-related offenses." Jones argued that this answer was "misleading at best" because Whitmire (1) had been a defendant in a 1986 Oklahoma County civil lawsuit; (2) had sought bankruptcy protection in 1989; (3) had been the subject of two emergency protective orders in 1999; and (4) had been convicted several times of Driving Under the Influence, including two felony convictions for that crime in 1984. Jones also presented evidence suggesting that Whitmire embellished or misrepresented the nature of his employment, claiming that he was a physical therapist, when in fact he was a physical therapist's assistant. The OCCA determined that Whitmire's DUI convictions were indeed traffic-related, and that whether his answer was intended to be misleading or untruthful was debatable. In any case, the OCCA found Jones had made no showing that Whitmire was unable to serve as a fair and impartial juror, and with no evidence before the OCCA of when or whether either trial or appellate counsel became aware of this juror's contacts with the legal system, the OCCA could not presume that counsel's failure to bring up these facts represented deficient performance. The OCCA observed that it is possible for trial counsel to have sound strategic reasons for keeping a panelist with a criminal record.

=== Petition for writ of habeas corpus ===
==== District court proceedings ====
Jones filed a petition for a writ of habeas corpus in the United States District Court for the Western District of Oklahoma on November 3, 2008, which was denied on May 21, 2013. In these proceedings, Jones sought relief under the Antiterrorism and Effective Death Penalty Act of 1996, which required him to demonstrate that the adjudication of his case in Oklahoma courts had resulted in a decision that was contrary to, or involved an unreasonable application of, clearly established federal law, as determined by the Supreme Court of the United States, or had resulted in a decision that was based on an unreasonable determination of the facts in light of the evidence presented in the state court proceeding. These claims were eligible for review only if Jones had exhausted the remedies available in Oklahoma courts before seeking federal review. Jones argued seven distinct grounds for relief.

In his first ground for relief, Jones claimed ineffective assistance of trial counsel, faulting his trial counsel for failing to (1) show the jury that Jones' hair was too short for him to be the one identified by Megan Tobey as the person who shot Howell; (2) argue that King, and not Jones, was most likely the one seen earlier in the day with Jordan; (3) present evidence of Jordan's confessions to the crime; and (4) demonstrate to the jury Jordan's pattern of falsehoods. The district court determined that the first and second of these claims were unexhausted, because Jones had not raised them in his direct appeal, and were also subject to the doctrine of anticipatory procedural bar, because Jones' failure to raise these claims in his initial post-conviction application would prevent him from returning to state court in order to exhaust them. Jones attempted to overcome the anticipatory procedural bar by asserting that failure to review his claims would result in a "fundamental miscarriage of justice" because he was innocent. To meet this exception, Jones was obliged to make "a colorable showing of factual innocence," which required him to "show that it is more likely than not that no reasonable juror would have convicted him in light of the new evidence." The district court determined that the facts of the length of Jones' hair compared to Jordan's and a possible sighting of King and Jordan together hours before the shooting, "even if accepted, do not persuasively show Petitioner is actually innocent of the crimes in light of the amount of evidence pointing to his guilt and, thus, do not justify a circumvention of an anticipatory procedural bar to his first and second complaints." The district court also found that although the third and fourth claim had been raised before the OCCA and were therefore exhausted, Jones had failed to show that the OCCA had rendered a decision on either claim which was contrary to, or an unreasonable application of, Supreme Court precedent.

In his second ground for relief, Jones also accused his trial counsel of ineffective assistance for having failed to make necessary requests and objections which would have shown that the search warrant for his family's home contained materially false information. The district court determined that Jones had demonstrated neither that law enforcement made false statements in the affidavit, nor that the OCCA's determination on this claim was unreasonable. In his third ground for relief, Jones alleged prosecutorial misconduct, saying that during closing arguments the prosecutor improperly gave her personal opinion of his guilt, vouched for the credibility of witnesses, misstated testimony, engaged in speculation, and started a demonstration as to how the shooting occurred by pointing her finger at a juror's head, and that these and "other instances" (which he did not identify) of prosecutorial misconduct deprived him of his right to due process of law under the Eighth and Fourteenth Amendments. The court found that Jones had not shown that the OCCA's determination on his prosecutorial misconduct claims was unreasonable. In his fourth ground for relief, Jones claimed he had been deprived of a fair trial because of the dismissal of the prospective juror who had said he would not vote for the death penalty under any circumstances, which the district court found had been reasonably adjudicated by OCCA, and because his counsel had been denied an opportunity to question the juror about his responses, a claim the district court found that Jones had not supported with clearly established federal law.

In his fifth ground for relief, Jones argued that his Constitutional rights to be present at all critical stages of his trial were violated in several instances without an express personal waiver and against his wishes. Specifically, he asserted he was not present at the following: (1) a hearing regarding which laboratory the State should use to do destructive DNA testing; (2) a hearing regarding a witness' testimony as to whether he testified truthfully on the subject of expected leniency on a pending charge and whether another witness disclosed all of his pending charges; (3) a hearing regarding possible suspicious telephone calls received by some of the jurors; (4) a hearing regarding jury instructions; (5) an admonition by the trial court to the jurors not to discuss the case during a break in deliberations to allow the jurors to move their cars out of the parking garage; and, (6) a hearing regarding a possible comment made by one of the jurors indicating that he may have already made up his mind about sentencing before hearing all of the evidence. The district court held that "a defendant's presence ... is not required at a conference or hearing at which he could do nothing, such as a hearing on a motion that concerns only matters of law," and that "in each of these instances, [Jones] would have gained nothing by attending and could have contributed nothing related to the subject matter of the hearings or conferences." Because he had not demonstrated that his presence at these specific hearings had a reasonably substantial relation to the fullness of his opportunity to defend against the charge, the court held that "his presence during these instances was not required for a fair hearing and he was not denied due process."

In his sixth ground for relief, Jones argued he had been prejudiced by ineffective assistance of his appellate counsel because he failed to discover a juror had "an extensive record of contacts" with the legal system, failed to discover that Christopher Berry could corroborate Emmanuel Littlejohn's claim that Christopher Jordan had confessed to the murder, and failed to argue the unconstitutionality of Oklahoma's determination of whether mitigating circumstances outweigh aggravating circumstances. The district court found that Jones had failed to show that the OCCA's determination on any of these issues had been unreasonable, and that the last in particular was precluded by Tenth Circuit precedent.

In his seventh ground for relief, Jones argued that Oklahoma's interpretation of the continuing threat aggravating circumstance was unconstitutionally vague and overbroad, as there was no homicide that could not be made eligible for the death penalty by the invocation of this aggravator. The district court noted that both the Tenth Circuit and the Supreme Court had found this aggravating circumstance to be constitutional, and found that Jones had not made any argument which would compel or permit the district court to disregard this binding precedent. The court also found that Jones had failed to demonstrate that the OCCA's denial of this constitutional challenge was either contrary to, or an unreasonable application of, clearly established federal law as determined by the Supreme Court.

==== Appeals ====
The United States Court of Appeals for the Tenth Circuit granted Jones review on the single question of "whether Jones's trial counsel was ineffective for failing to seek evidence corroborating a confession purportedly made by Jones's coconspirator," which Jones had already brought before the OCCA in his application for post-conviction relief. According to the Supreme Court's precedent in Strickland v. Washington, to prevail on a claim of ineffective assistance of counsel required Jones to demonstrate both that "counsel committed serious errors in light of prevailing professional norms such that his legal representation fell below an objective standard of reasonableness," and that "there is a reasonable probability that, but for counsel's unprofessional errors, the result of the proceeding would have been different."

Jones conceded that "[t]he record shows that [McKenzie] looked into Littlejohn's claim and made an informed, strategic decision not to call him as a witness" and that the OCCA's resolution of his claim of ineffectiveness for McKenzie's failure to call Littlejohn as a witness "was likely reasonable." Jones argued, however, that the OCCA should not have applied this same analysis to McKenzie's failure to seek corroboration of Littlejohn's statement. Jones construed the OCCA as having found that McKenzie had rendered reasonable assistance by making an informed strategic decision not to seek corroboration. The circuit court exercised its discretion to entertain this argument although it would ordinarily have been considered as waived because it was not raised before the district court. The 10th Circuit interpreted the OCCA as having rejected this claim of ineffective assistance because the failure to discover what Berry had purportedly overheard did not prejudice Jones, regardless of whether it represented deficient performance on McKenzie's part. The court found that "the OCCA quite clearly concluded that there was not a reasonable probability that the result of Jones's trial would have been different had McKenzie conducted further investigation, discovered Berry's testimony, and presented testimony from both Littlejohn and Berry at trial" and that "this conclusion ... was entirely reasonable."

After this decision, David McKenzie noticed that one of the members of the three-judge panel who reviewed Jones' appeal was Jerome Holmes, and alerted Jones' current lawyers that in 2002, Holmes, then a federal prosecutor, had written a newspaper editorial defending the verdict and sentence in Jones' case, and mocking McKenzie's claims of racial bias. Jones' defense team filed a petition for rehearing before a new panel of judges on the grounds that Holmes should have recused himself. Holmes recused himself from consideration of the motion, and the two other members of the original panel vacated the previous decision and granted rehearing before a new panel of three randomly chosen judges. On November 10, 2015, the new panel again denied Jones relief, finding that he had failed to demonstrate that the OCCA's decision was contrary to clearly established federal law or based on an unreasonable determination of the facts. The Supreme Court denied review on October 3, 2016.

=== Glossip v. Chandler ===
In February 2020, more than two dozen inmates, including Jones, filed a motion to reopen the 2014 lawsuit, Glossip v. Chandler after the state announced plans to resume executions after a nearly six-year moratorium, claiming the new lethal injection protocol was incomplete. The lawsuit claims there is autopsy evidence suggesting that the drugs used in lethal injection make people feel as though they are drowning and being "burned alive". In August 2021, United States District Court for the Western District of Oklahoma Judge Stephen Friot ruled that because Jones and five other inmates had not specified an alternative execution method to lethal injection, they could no longer be included in the lawsuit. On October 15, 2021, United States Court of Appeals for the Tenth Circuit ruled that the lower court made a mistake by dismissing the six prisoners from the lawsuit.

== Post-conviction ==
In 2014, Christopher Jordan was released after serving fifteen years in prison for his complicity in Howell's murder.

In 2017, a DNA test identified Jones's DNA on the red bandana that was found wrapped around the murder weapon in his family's home. Jones's public defender stated that the test only matched 7 out of 21 genetic markers and was not up to law enforcement standards.

In 2020, Roderick Wesley contacted Jones' defense team stating that he had been friends with Christopher Jordan when they were both inmates at Brickeys. Wesley wrote that Jordan would occasionally say on the basketball court, "I'll f--- you up like I did that man," which Wesley wrote off as trash talk, but that in the fall of 2009, Jordan "just decided to spill his guts to me." Wesley claimed that Jordan said, "My co-defendant is on death row behind a murder I committed." Wesley was unsure what to make of this admission until he chanced to see an ABC News special about Julius Jones.

=== Parole board hearings and public advocacy ===
On March 1, 2021, Oklahoma County District Attorney David Prater wrote a letter to the parole board objecting to the commutation and accusing Jones and his attorneys of "a coordinated and alarmingly successful campaign of misinformation, spurred by media frenzy, which is specifically targeted to manipulate and mislead the public through dissemination of half-truths and, frequently, outright lies," and discussing what he described as Jones' "extensive criminal history," the evidence and testimony in the case, the new DNA evidence from the bandana, and reasons for doubting the alibi offered by Jones' family, as well as Littlejohn and Berry's claims to have heard Jordan confess. Jones' legal team responded, saying that "much of what is in this letter is uncharged accusations...He ignores that fact that three people came forward and said that Christopher Jordan confessed to them that he committed the murder."

In April 2021, Jones wrote a letter to the parole board stating "I did not kill Mr. Howell. I did not participate in any way in his murder; and the first time I saw him was on television when his death was reported." In this letter, Jones said that Christopher Jordan spent the night at Jones' house on the evening of the murder and that Jordan planted evidence framing Jones for the murder. Oklahoma County is among the five worst counties in the U.S. in terms of wrongful capital convictions.

On September 13, 2021, the Oklahoma Pardon and Parole Board held a commutation hearing and expressed doubt about Jones' guilt. After several hours of testimony the board voted 3–1 in favor of commuting Jones' sentence to life in prison with the possibility of parole. Board members Adam Luck, Kelly Doyle, and Larry Morris voted in favor of clemency and Richard Smothermon voted against clemency. Board member Scott Williams recused himself from the vote due to an ongoing investigation of the board. The Board voted again in October and received the same results. The Board's decision was a recommendation for the Governor of Oklahoma, Kevin Stitt. On November 1, 2021, Jones spoke before the Board at a clemency hearing and argued his innocence.

Howell's daughter, Rachel Howell, remained adamant that Jones killed her father and the evidence in the case supports that. She recalled to a reporter, "When we pulled up in the driveway and stopped, my dad had kind of cracked the door open. I looked over. I was sitting right behind him, right behind my dad. I was in the backseat right behind the driver's seat, and I looked over and saw Julius Jones walking up to the car. It happened so fast, but I saw him walking up, and I remember waving, because I'm a child. I don't know what's about to happen. I just remember kind of waving, and he literally shot my dad in the head and did not say a word. He did not say a word. He shot my dad, and I watched my dad's head go like that. That is the vision that I have every night is my dad's head falling to the right."

On September 20, 2021, the Oklahoma Court of Criminal Appeals set execution dates for Jones and six other inmates on death row. Jones was scheduled for execution on November 18, 2021. Jones' attorney, along with other attorneys for people on death row, filed a request for a stay of execution. The attorneys argued that they had an agreement with former Attorney General of Oklahoma, Michael J. Hunter, that no executions would take place while they awaited an upcoming trial in February. The trial challenges whether Oklahoma's execution protocol, a three-drug cocktail, is legal. On October 27, 2021, the 10th Circuit Court of Appeals released a decision staying the executions of Jones and another man on death row, John Marion Grant. The current attorney general, John M. O'Connor, appealed and asked the court to vacate the stays. The United States Supreme Court overturned the stays of execution for Jones and Grant; Grant was executed on October 28, 2021.

On November 3, 2021, the Oklahoma Legislative Black Caucus held a press conference asking Governor Stitt to grant Jones clemency. Members of the caucus, including Jason Lowe and Monroe Nichols, met with Jones a few months prior to the press conference.

On November 11, 2021, five Republican lawmakers, John Talley, Logan Phillips, Kevin McDugle, Garry Mize, and Preston Stinson released a joint statement asking Governor Stitt to accept the Oklahoma Pardon and Parole Board's clemency recommendation. Mercedes Schlapp, Matt Schlapp, and the American Conservative Union also asked Stitt to grant Jones clemency. More than 6 million people signed a change.org petition requesting that Jones not be executed.

The Howell family asked that the execution move forward. Governor Stitt met separately with Howell's family and Jones' defense team, but did not meet with the Jones family.

=== Commutation of sentence ===
On November 18, 2021, Governor Stitt commuted Jones' sentence to life without parole less than four hours before his scheduled execution. As a condition of clemency, Stitt ordered that Jones will never be eligible for a further commutation or pardon for the rest of his life. It is rare for death row inmates to be granted clemency by an Oklahoma governor, with only four having occurred prior to Jones; three by Brad Henry and one by Frank Keating.

Following the decision, Jones' family thanked Governor Stitt for sparing Jones from execution but also acknowledged they would keep fighting for his release. Jones's mother, Madeline Davis-Jones, praised God and Governor Stitt and issued a statement saying, "I still believe that every day Julius spends behind bars is an injustice, and I will never stop speaking out for him or fighting to free him. But today is a good day, and I am thankful to Gov. Stitt for that." Kim Kardashian also sent out a series of tweets thanking Governor Stitt for commuting the sentence. Jones' attorneys thanked Governor Stitt for commuting the sentence, but also added they would have preferred him to go with the recommendation of the board that Jones serve life with the possibility of parole.

The family of Paul Howell responded to the decision by saying they took comfort in the fact that Jones would not be eligible for parole or be considered for a commutation for the remainder of his life. The Attorney General of Oklahoma, John M. O'Connor, was disappointed with the decision, claiming the death penalty was warranted in Jones' case.

=== Post-commutation advocacy ===
In 2023, the Attorney General Gentner Drummond conducted a rare independent review early when he assumed office (after O'Connor) of the Richard Glossip case, a white man who had been scheduled for execution three times, and filed a motion on April 6 to vacate Glossip's conviction. Advocates say the AG should do the same for Jones's case.

== In popular culture ==
In 2018, Jones was featured in the first season of The Last Defense, an American documentary series that explores and exposes flaws in the American justice system. The episodes about Jones focused on evidence attorneys failed to present in court regarding Jones' co-defendant Christopher Jordan. Since the documentary aired, Kim Kardashian, J. Cole, and Stephen Curry have expressed support for Jones, and Kardashian visited Jones in prison. Jones' story was also featured on a 2020 podcast episode featuring Kardashian and a 2021 episode of The Late Late Show with James Corden. On July 15, 2020, Jones was featured on an episode of 20/20 titled The Last Defense: Julius Jones – A Special Edition of 20/20. On May 19, 2022, Jones' story was featured on Episode 6 of The Kardashians, 'This is a Life or Death Situation', focusing on Kim Kardashian's successful efforts to obtain a commutation of his death sentence.

== See also ==
- Kevin Keith
