= Richard Glossip =

American prisoner on death row

- Born: Richard Eugene Glossip; February 9, 1963 (age 63)
- Convictions: First degree murder; reduced to being an accessory after the fact to first degree murder in a plea agreement

Details
- Imprisoned at: Released on court bail

Richard Eugene Glossip (born February 9, 1963) is an American former prisoner who was on death row for over two decades at Oklahoma State Penitentiary after being convicted of commissioning the 1997 murder of Barry Van Treese. The man who murdered Van Treese, Justin Sneed (age 19 when he committed the crime), had a "meth habit" and agreed to plead guilty in exchange for testifying against Glossip. Sneed received a life sentence without parole, avoiding the death penalty by his plea bargain. Glossip's case has attracted international attention due to the unusual nature of his conviction, namely that there was little or no corroborating evidence, with the first case against him described as "extremely weak" by the Oklahoma Court of Criminal Appeals. On February 25, 2025, the US Supreme Court set aside Glossip's conviction in Glossip v. Oklahoma and ordered a new trial. On May 14, 2026, Oklahoma County District Judge Natalie Mai set Glossip's bond at $500,000. She ordered him to live with his wife, wear an electronic monitoring device, abide by a curfew from 10 pm to 7 am; and she forbade him from traveling outside the state.

On November 12, 2026, Glossip pleaded guilty to a lesser charge of being an accessory after the fact to first degree murder. He faces up to 45 years in prison when he is sentenced in December.

Glossip is notable for his role as named plaintiff in the 2015 Supreme Court case Glossip v. Gross, which ruled that executions carried out by a three-drug protocol of midazolam, pancuronium bromide, and potassium chloride did not constitute cruel and unusual punishment under the Eighth Amendment to the United States Constitution.

In September and October 2015, Glossip was granted three successive stays of execution due to questions about Oklahoma's lethal injection drugs after Oklahoma Department of Corrections officials used potassium acetate instead of potassium chloride to execute Charles Frederick Warner on January 15, 2015, contrary to protocol. Oklahoma Attorney General Scott Pruitt ordered a multicounty grand jury investigation of the execution drug mix-up.

== Murder of Barry Van Treese ==
On January 7, 1997, Justin Sneed beat Barry Van Treese to death with a baseball bat. The killing occurred at the Best Budget Inn in Oklahoma City, Oklahoma, where Van Treese was the owner, Sneed was the maintenance man, and Glossip was the manager. In exchange for avoiding the death penalty, Sneed confessed and told police that Glossip had instructed him to commit the murder.

Glossip insisted on his actual innocence and refused to accept a plea bargain. In July 1998, an Oklahoma jury convicted Glossip of the murder and sentenced him to death. In 2001, the Oklahoma Court of Criminal Appeals unanimously threw out that conviction, calling the case "extremely weak" and finding Glossip had received unconstitutionally ineffective assistance of counsel.

In August 2004, a second Oklahoma jury convicted Glossip of the murder and sentenced him to death. Glossip complained that prosecutors had intimidated his defense attorney into resigning. However, in April 2007, the Oklahoma Court of Criminal Appeals affirmed the death sentence, with two judges in the majority, one judge specially concurring, and two judges dissenting. Glossip attracted the advocacy of Sister Helen Prejean, but failed to get the clemency board to consider letters from Sneed's family, who believed Sneed to be lying.

== Innocence controversy ==
Glossip's legal team asserts that Justin Sneed was addicted to methamphetamine at the time that he murdered Van Treese, and that he habitually broke into vehicles in the parking lot of the Best Budget Inn while he was employed as a maintenance man. Glossip's death sentence is controversial because he was convicted almost entirely on the testimony of Sneed, who confessed to bludgeoning Van Treese to death with an aluminum baseball bat by himself and who was spared a death sentence himself by implicating Glossip.

In 2015, Oklahoma City police released a 1999 police report showing that a box of evidence had been marked for destruction. The report was never provided to attorneys who represented Glossip in his second trial or his appeals, according to his new defense team. In an interview published the same day, Glossip's attorney, Donald Knight, criticised his previous attorneys, saying "They did a terrible job. Horrible. No preparation. No investigation."

On September 22, 2015, Glossip's attorneys filed papers referring to a July 1997 psychiatric evaluation of Sneed, in which he said he understood he was charged with murder in connection with a burglary and made no reference to Glossip's involvement.

On September 23, 2015, Glossip's attorneys filed papers asserting that two new witnesses were being intimidated. In affidavits, one witness had claimed that Sneed laughed about lying in court about Glossip's involvement; another said he was convinced based on his conversations with Sneed that Sneed acted alone.

On September 24, 2015, the Oklahoma Attorney General's Office filed papers stating that the claims of the new witnesses were "inherently suspect", and that the time it took Van Treese to die and whether blood loss contributed to his death did not affect the trial outcome, in response to a defense claim that the testimony of Dr. Chai Choi, who performed the autopsy, was incorrect.

On September 28, 2015, the Oklahoma Court of Criminal Appeals voted 3–2 to proceed with execution. Presiding Judge Clancy Smith wrote "While finality of judgment is important, the state has no interest in executing an actually innocent man. An evidentiary hearing will give Glossip the chance to prove his allegations that Sneed has recanted, or demonstrate to the court that he cannot provide evidence that would exonerate him." Judge Arlene Johnson wrote that the original trial was "deeply flawed" and an evidentiary hearing should be ordered.

On September 30, 2015, Glossip spoke to the UK's Sky News on the telephone from his cell as he was served his last meal. Glossip said that Sneed testified at trial that Glossip did not wear or own gloves, "And now he's on TV saying that I did. It continues to show the discrepancies in anything that Justin Sneed has to say." On the same day, Virgin CEO Richard Branson bought an advertisement in The Oklahoman newspaper which had campaigned against the execution, with Branson stating the evidence against Glossip is flawed and that "every person is deserving of a fair trial", adding, "Your state is about to execute a man whose guilt has not been proven beyond a reasonable doubt." The United States Supreme Court denied a stay of execution. Justice Stephen Breyer wrote that he would have granted a stay. Ultimately, Oklahoma Governor Mary Fallin did grant Glossip a stay of execution the same day, citing discrepancies with the lethal injection protocol (see next section).

In July 2022, Oklahoma Pardon and Parole Board member Richard Smothermon, who had up to that point voted to deny clemency to every death row inmate seeking it, voted to recuse himself from voting because his wife had been a prosecutor on the case. In August 2022, 61 lawmakers urged Attorney General John O'Connor to support Glossip's request for a new hearing because without "support from O'Connor, the Court of Criminal Appeals is expected to reject Glossip's claims of innocence, as it has done before."

=== Kevin McDugle advocacy ===
In 2022, Oklahoma state representative Kevin McDugle, a Republican, said "he would fight to end the death penalty if Glossip dies." He has been quoted as saying, "They can show me nothing that ties him, and the one thing they have is a witness that says that he was the one that told him to commit the murder. Guess who that witness was? The actual murderer that beat him with a baseball bat. He's the witness, and what did he get for that testimony? He got off of death row himself and got life in prison." In May 2023, McDugle accused the District Attorneys Council of applying "pressure across the system to protect their power" and claimed district attorneys are "deeply embedded" in Oklahoma's branches of government in his attempt to help Richard Glossip. The Council has also "actively sought to undermine Prater's successor, Vicki Behenna, the county's first female elected DA". Prater and the Council knows "that if the courts agree that Glossip's conviction should be overturned, it will be up to Behenna to decide whether to retry the case." McDugle worked with Dr. Phil to bring attention to Glossip's case. McDugle is quoted as saying "This case is no longer about justice. It's about power, pride, and politics." He has threatened to try to legislatively put a stop to the death penalty in Oklahoma if Glossip is executed.

In 2024, McDugle said he "believes that members of the Oklahoma District Attorneys Council had improper communications with the Oklahoma Pardon and Parole Board prior to Richard Glossip's clemency hearing in April 2023." District Attorney Jason Hicks criticized Attorney General Getner Drummond for sharing his views on the case. In other communications revealed, district attorneys referred to Drummond as a "douche", "complained among themselves that the attorney general had turned Glossip's clemency hearing into a 'circus'", and accused Drummond of vying for a run for governor.

== Oklahoma lethal injection protocol controversy ==
On October 13, 2014, the Oklahoma Attorney General said the state did not have an adequate supply of execution drugs and delayed the execution of Glossip and two other inmates. On January 28, 2015, the U.S. Supreme Court halted executions in Oklahoma until it decided on lethal injection drugs. However, in June 2015, the Supreme Court approved the use of Oklahoma's lethal injection mix in combination with midazolam (see sub-section below) to carry out executions, leading to a reinstatement of capital punishments in the state and a new execution date for Glossip.

Governor Fallin's stay of Glossip's execution on September 30, 2015, was motivated by the Department of Corrections having received potassium acetate instead of potassium chloride. The execution was reset for November 6, 2015.

On October 1, 2015, Attorney General Scott Pruitt asked the Court of Criminal Appeals to issue an indefinite stay of all scheduled executions in Oklahoma, citing the Department of Correction's acquisition of a drug contrary to protocol. The next day, the request was granted.

On October 6, 2015, Governor Mary Fallin said she hired an independent attorney, Robert McCampbell, to advise her on the legal process.

On October 8, 2015, it was reported that Oklahoma Corrections Department officials used potassium acetate to execute Charles Frederick Warner on January 15, 2015, contrary to protocol. An attorney representing Glossip and other Oklahoma death row inmates said logs from Warner's execution initialed by a prison staff member indicated the use of potassium chloride; however, an autopsy report showed 12 vials of potassium acetate were used.

According to a report on October 16, 2015, due to a grand jury investigation, it was likely the state would not conduct an execution for more than a year.

=== Midazolam controversy ===
Glossip was the named plaintiff in Glossip v. Gross, a U.S. Supreme Court case decided in June 2015 in which a divided Court ruled 5–4 with Antonin Scalia, Clarence Thomas, Samuel Alito, John Roberts, and Anthony Kennedy voting to allow the execution to proceed, and Stephen Breyer, Elena Kagan, Sonia Sotomayor, and Ruth Bader Ginsburg voting to halt it. Sotomayor wrote, "But under the court's new rule, it would not matter whether the state intended to use midazolam, or instead to have petitioners drawn and quartered, slowly tortured to death or actually burned at the stake." The court found the drug midazolam may be used as a sedative in combination with other lethal injection drugs. The case was originally titled Warner v. Gross, but Glossip replaced Charles Frederick Warner as the plaintiff after Warner was executed in January 2015, also by Oklahoma, before the case was decided. The case was reopened in March 2020 as Glossip v. Chandler after Oklahoma ended its moratorium on the death penalty, with plaintiffs challenging Oklahoma's execution protocol.

== Execution attempts and new trial request ==
On July 1, 2022, Glossip was one of twenty-five death row inmates to be scheduled for execution in Oklahoma. He was scheduled to be executed on September 22, 2022.

On August 16, 2022, Oklahoma Governor Kevin Stitt granted a 60-day stay of execution. Glossip was then scheduled to be executed on December 8, 2022. On November 3, 2022, Governor Stitt again granted a stay of execution for Glossip, allowing time for the Oklahoma Court of Criminal Appeals to address his pending legal proceedings. He was rescheduled to be executed on February 16, 2023. On January 24, 2023, Glossip's execution was rescheduled to May 18, 2023, after Attorney General Gentner Drummond requested a new execution timetable to accommodate for staff shortages within the Department of Corrections. In March, Drummond announced his office would seek to stay the execution until 2024 to allow an independent counsel to review the case. After the independent review was released, his office filed a motion to vacate the murder conviction of Glossip in April 2023. Drummond did not "proclaim Glossip's innocence, but he did note in a news release there was enough doubt of his guilt that the death penalty and his conviction for murder is inappropriate." The case went back to the Oklahoma Court of Criminal Appeals.

On April 20, 2023, the Oklahoma Court of Criminal Appeals ruled against Richard Glossip despite a motion from the state's Attorney General asking the court to vacate Glossip's conviction and remand the case to a lower court. This ruling meant that barring clemency being granted or any further appeals to the US Supreme Court, Glossip would be executed by lethal injection on May 18.

In late April 2023, a Clemency Hearing held by the Oklahoma Pardon and Parole Board denied Glossip clemency in a 2–2 ruling. The reason why a tied vote resulted in denial of clemency in favor of death is due to the rules stating that there must be a 3–2 majority ruling in favor of clemency. There were only 4 panel members instead of 5 as member Richard Smothermon recused himself due to a conflict of interest, being the husband of Glossip's trial prosecutor Connie Smothermon.

In May 2023, Glossip's attorneys filed an application for stay of execution to the U.S. Supreme Court citing new evidence casting doubt on the reliability of the state's star witness Justin Sneed, the man who was convicted of actually carrying out the murder of Barry Van Treese. Oklahoma did not oppose the application and subsequently filed a response supporting the stay of execution. Governor Stitt reiterated that he will continue to follow the Parole Board's lead. Ahead of the board hearing, "Kim Kardashian urged her millions of social media followers to contact the parole board and Stitt in a bid to stop the execution." On May 5, the Supreme Court halted Glossip's May 18 execution pending disposition of his petitions for writs of certiorari. This was after Dr. Phil, Rep. Kevin McDugle, Rep. Justin Humphrey, and Sister Helen Prejean rallied for the stay. The Attorney General noted that he was not aware of any AG supporting clemency in the past for a death row inmate, but he was in support.

In June 2023, Randy Bauman, a board member of the Oklahoma Coalition to Abolish the Death Penalty, wrote that it was unfair Glossip did not have all five members in his case and pushed back against the idea that the board is a "safety valve" for an unjust and fallible criminal justice system. The vote had tied because one board member recused himself. Instead of a tie weighing in favor of the convicted, it weighs in favor of the state.

The Supreme Court agreed to hear Glossip's case on January 22, 2024. Glossip v. Oklahoma was argued before the court on October 9, with associate justice Neil Gorsuch recusing himself due to prior involvement in litigation involving Glossip. On February 25, 2025, the Supreme Court vacated Glossip's conviction and ordered a new trial be granted, reversing the State of Oklahoma's affirmation of the previous conviction. The State of Oklahoma subsequently confirmed its intention to try Glossip for the murder a third time, albeit without seeking the death penalty on this occasion.

== Subsequent proceedings ==
Following the overturning of his conviction Glossip's attorneys requested that the court release him on bond to await a decision on his retrial. In July 2025, District Judge Heather Coyle ruled that Glossip could not be released on bond and would remain incarcerated until his third trial. Judge Coyle later recused herself from the case on August 14 at the request of Glossip's legal team. No reason for the recusal was given publicly, but Glossip's supporters suggested that Coyle's decision was based on her past service as a prosecutor at the same office which conducted the case. In the following months, several other judges assigned to the case also recused themselves due to close ties with the Oklahoma County District Attorney's office, forcing the Chief District Judge to assign civil court justice Natalie Mai to the case in December 2025.

On December 29, Glossip asked Judge Mai to reconsider Coyle's earlier ruling denying him release on bond, stating that Coyle's ruling was "directly at odds" with the Supreme Court's decision. Glossip's legal team also claimed that prison officials were refusing him access to medical treatment despite his health deteriorating due to a blood clot, and that continued detention might pose a risk to his life. Two state senators, David Bullard and Justin Humphrey, wrote letters to the court in support of Glossip's release. A bond hearing took place on February 12, 2026, during which Glossip's lawyers argued the evidence against him was not strong enough to justify pretrial detention. In reply, the prosecution claimed that he was a possible flight risk with very few ties to Oklahoma. Glossip was ultimately granted bail on May 14, allowing him to be released from prison for the first time in nearly thirty years. His bail was set at $500,000. Kim Kardashian paid the $50,000 bond required for him to leave prison “shortly after it was set.”

On November 12, 2026, Glossip pleaded guilty to a lesser charge of being an accessory after the fact to first degree murder. He faces up to 45 years in prison when he is sentenced in December. Glossip maintained that had he had nothing to do with the planning or the carrying out of the murder, but acknowledged that he did not inform the police when he learned that Sneed had killed Van Treese and also helped place plexiglass over a broken window at the hotel in connection to the murder.

== In popular culture ==
In 2017, Killing Richard Glossip, a four-part TV series about Glossip's innocence controversy and Oklahoma execution scandal premiered on Investigation Discovery.

His case was covered in a Dr. Phil episode.

== Personal life ==
In March 2022, he married Lea Rodger of Florida, an anti-death penalty advocate. Lea is Glossip's fourth wife. He also had one common law marriage at the time he was arrested. He has eaten his "last" meal three times.

== See also ==
- Capital punishment in Oklahoma
- Execution of Clayton Lockett
- Julius Jones, inmate from Oklahoma who has also proclaimed his innocence
- John M. O'Connor
- Oklahoma Pardon and Parole Board
- Richard Smothermon
- Edward J. Konieczny
- Cathy Stocker
- Larry Morris
