= Kevin Keith =

American prisoner (born 1963)

- Born: Kevin A. Keith; December 18, 1963 (age 62); Ohio, U.S.
- Status: Incarcerated
- Convictions: Aggravated murder (3 counts); Attempted aggravated murder (3 counts)
- Penalty: Death (1994; commuted); Life imprisonment without the possibility of parole (2010)

Details
- Victims: Marichell Chatman, 24; Marchae Chatman, 4 Linda Chatman, 39
- Date: February 13, 1994
- Locations: Bucyrus, Ohio, U.S.
- Imprisoned at: London Correctional Institution

Kevin Keith (born December 18, 1963) is an American prisoner and former death row inmate from Ohio who was convicted of the 1994 triple-homicide that killed Marichell Chatman, her daughter Marchae, and Linda Chatman. In 2022, his case received international attention due to claims of innocence and controversy surrounding his trial and conviction highlighted on a podcast hosted by Kim Kardashian titled The System: The Case of Kevin Keith.

== Early life ==
Keith was raised in Crestline, Ohio, where he lived at the time of the crime. Keith has one brother, Charles. In high school, Keith played defensive tackle at Canton McKinley High School, winning a state title in 1981. As Keith got older, he began dealing drugs to make a living.

== Crime ==
On February 13, 1994, three people were killed and three people were injured in a shooting at the Bucyrus Estates apartments in Bucyrus, Ohio. Marichell Chatman, her daughter Marchae, and her aunt, Linda Chatman were killed in the shooting. Marichell Chatman's boyfriend, Richard Warren, and her cousins, six-year-old Quanita Reeves and four-year-old Quentin Reeves were wounded. Warren, who was shot in the jaw, took off running toward a restaurant and was shot again in the buttocks. At the restaurant Warren told four people, including one police officer, that he did not know who had shot him.

=== Investigation and witness accounts ===
The first descriptions of the scene described "a large black man" at the apartment complex. A total of 24 shell casings were found at the crime scene, and another was found where Keith had later picked up his girlfriend from work; all 25 casings were matched to the same firearm. Several days after the shooting, police interviewed one of the victims, Richard Warren. Warren stated that Linda Chatman had stepped outside of the apartment to meet a man. When Warren asked Marichell Chatman who the man was, she stated that "it was Kevin who had been involved in a large drug bust." Linda and the man, who wore a mask, then came inside and talked about the basketball game while the man drank two glasses of water through the mask that covered his mouth. Afterward, the man ordered them to lie on the ground and began shooting. It was later determined the large black man originally described was Keith's half-brother who had recently moved into the apartment complex. When a nurse asked Quanita Reeves, the six-year-old victim, whose fault it was that she was in the hospital, Quanita stated it was her "Daddy's friend," Bruce Melton and repeatedly asserted that Keith was not the shooter.

The Bucyrus Police Department and Crawford County prosecutors claimed that Keith carried out the shooting in retaliation for his January 1994 arrest for selling 2.6 grams of crack cocaine, which had resulted from information received from Rudel Chatman. At the time, Rudel Chatman was a confidential informant for the Galion Police Department. Keith was arrested on February 15, 1994, and his bond was set for $1 million. He was never questioned by the police.

In 2022, Quanita Reeves, who was six at the time of the shooting, and Quentin Reeves, who was four, claimed that they were visiting their cousin Marichell Chatman at the time of the crime. They claimed that when they went downstairs to eat dinner there was a knock on the door and Kevin Keith was there, wearing no mask or gloves. The Reeves' said that they knew Keith because he was Marichell's ex-boyfriend, but did not know he was a drug dealer and that Marichell's brother, Rudel Chatman, was an informant who had recently helped to expose a drug ring involving Keith. They said Keith was carrying a bag which he said was full of laundry and asked for a drink of water. After drinking several glasses of water and realizing that Rudel Chatman was not there, the Reeves' claimed that Keith pulled a gun from the bag and shot the family. Quanita claims that she gave police the wrong name when she was in the hospital but that she is positive Keith was the shooter.

== Legal proceedings ==
=== Trial ===
Keith's trial began on May 10, 1994, only a few months after the murders, and he was represented by attorney James Banks, who had never worked on a capital murder case before. At trial, the prosecution claimed that Keith was trying to retaliate against Rudel Chatman for his role as an informant in the drug bust that led to Keith's January 1994 arrest. Keith presented multiple alibi witnesses which placed him about thirty miles away from the crime. Keith claimed that he spent the evening of February 13, 1994, with his two girlfriends. He claimed that at around 6 p.m. he was at the home of his girlfriend, Melanie Davison, in Mansfield, Ohio. Neighbors testified that at approximately 8:45 p.m., the time of the shooting, Keith and Davison left Davison's home in a blue car that belonged to another girlfriend of Kevin's. At around 9 p.m. they arrived at Keith's aunt's home in Crestline, Ohio, and Keith went inside to talk to his uncle, Roy Price, to borrow five dollars. Keith claimed that they left his aunt's home ten minutes later and returned to Davison's home at 9:25 p.m.

Forensic analyst G. Michelle Yezzo testified that a license plate imprint of the numbers "043" left in a snow bank at the crime scene matched Keith's girlfriend's car. She also testified that she could conclude that tire tracks also matched the car after comparing the tracks to a photograph on a tire brochure.

Quanita and Quentin Reeves did not testify in the trial because they were still in the hospital and Quanita's statement that the shooter was Bruce Melton was not entered. No forensic evidence connected Keith to the crime. The jury found Keith guilty and sentenced him to death on June 1, 1994. Two Bucyrus police officers resigned immediately following Keith's conviction.

=== Appeals ===
In 2010, judges ruled that the evidence against Keith was "compelling, persuasive and overwhelming."

In an appeal, Keith's attorneys wrote that "The sheer distance involved makes it impossible for Keith to have been the shooter," noting that "From Gracie Keith's house, in Crestline, it is 19 miles to the apartment, and it would have taken approximately 25 minutes to make that drive. And Mansfield and Bucyrus are approximately 30 miles apart. Keith was accounted for before, during, and after the shootings that took place at 8:45 p.m."

Following Keith's jury trial, new evidence regarding an alternative suspect, Rodney Melton, came to light including a statement Melton made to his girlfriend claiming that he was paid $15,000 to "cripple" Rudel Chatman and documents showing that Melton was known to wear a mask similar to the one worn by the perpetrator of the crime. Melton had been involved in a pharmacy burglary ring in which Rudel Chatman had been acting as an informant to the police. Rodney Melton was also the brother of Bruce Melton, who had initially been identified by Quanita Reeves, and he drove a car similar to the one described by witnesses. His car had a license plate containing "043", which matched the imprint left in the snowbank at the scene of the crime. Evidence was also discovered showing the location of a bullet casing used at Keith's trial may have been wrong.

==== Brady violations ====
On October 28, 2016, Keith and his lawyer, public defender Rachel Troutman, filed a motion for new trial in the Ohio Third District Court of Appeals, claiming the state failed to make Brady disclosures regarding a witness, G. Michele Yezzo. Keith claimed that the state relied heavily upon the testimony of Yezzo, a forensic analyst at the Bureau of Criminal Identification and Investigation, who provided a crucial link between Keith and the crime scene. He claimed Yezzo's personnel file showed that Yezzo was mentally unstable and that her forensic conclusions were untrustworthy. Yezzo's personnel file included allegations that she habitually provided police departments the answers they wanted in cases. Yezzo had previously been placed on administrative leave and was actively under investigation at the time she worked on Keith's case. Evidence also included a copy of radio dispatch logs from the Bucyrus Police Department. The department had claimed they had obtained Keith's name from a hospital nurse who had called and told them that a shooting victim had identified Keith as the perpetrator, but the dispatch logs did not reflect the call and a note to "ignore for now" was written at the top of a subpoena for the dispatch logs. On January 13, 2017, Crawford County Common Pleas Judge Sean Leuthold denied Keith's motion for new trial, stating that he did not find that "the information in Yezzo's personnel file constitutes newly discovered evidence that would allow for a motion for new trial."

In 2018, the United States Court of Appeals for the Sixth Circuit reviewed the evidence and stated that "no reasonable factfinder would have found him guilty." Following the Sixth Circuit's decision, Keith was allowed to present new evidence to Judge Solomon Oliver Jr. of the United States District Court for the Northern District of Ohio contesting his conviction.

== Post-conviction ==
Keith was scheduled to be executed on September 15, 2010, by lethal injection, by a unanimous recommendation of the parole board. On September 2, 2010, Ohio governor Ted Strickland commuted Keith's sentence to life without parole, noting that there were questions about the evidence and a "troubling" failure to investigate other suspects. At the time, Strickland released a statement explaining his decision:

It is my view, after a thorough review of the information and evidence available to me at this time, that it is far more likely that Mr. Keith committed these murders than it is likely that he did not. Yet, despite the evidence supporting his guilt and the substantial legal review of Mr. Keith's conviction, many legitimate questions have been raised regarding the evidence in support of the conviction and the investigation which led to it. Under these circumstances, I cannot allow Mr. Keith to be executed.

In 2022, Strickland stated that he wished he had completely commuted Keith's sentence and that he had expressed this to the current governor Mike DeWine.

== Podcast ==
In 2017, producer Lori Rothschild Ansaldi heard about Keith's case and began talking with him. Rothschild Ansaldi was initially interested in creating a television show, but thought a podcast might better explain the story. She connected with Kim Kardashian, who expressed support for the commutation of Keith's sentence in July 2019. On October 3, 2022, Kardashian released the first episode of a podcast created with Spotify titled The System: The Case of Kevin Keith, which gained international attention. Following its release, the podcast was ranked number one on the charts. The eight-episode podcast outlines the discrepancies throughout Keith's case. On the podcast, Ohio Supreme Court Justice Michael P. Donnelly agreed to an interview "to demonstrate the need to reform the post conviction process in Ohio for those who claim they are wrongly convicted" and stated that "Kevin Keith's case should concern anyone who is concerned with the integrity of the system." On episode eight of the podcast, Kardashian spoke with former Governor Ted Strickland, who stated that he wished he had fully commuted Keith's sentence in 2010.

In October 2022, surviving victims Quentin and Quanita Reeves criticized the podcast, claiming that they were never contacted and that they do not care about new evidence. When the podcast premiered, Quentin stated "We saw it with our own eyes. You don’t forget something like that. I don't care what Kim Kardashian says – Kevin did it." Quanita said that Kim Kardashian "did not contact us, not one time. If Kim Kardashian wants to get involved, she should come and meet us face-to-face." The producers of the podcast claim the survivors of the shooting were contacted multiple times but declined to participate in the podcast and asked the production team to stop contacting them. Quanita later stated in November 2022 that she had blocked Rothschild Ansaldi's number a few years prior, which explained the miscommunication about whether they had been contacted.

== See also ==
- Julius Jones (prisoner)
