= Oklahoma Pardon and Parole Board =

Oklahoma Pardon & Parole Board
Agency overview
- Formed: July 11, 1944
- Headquarters: Oklahoma City, Oklahoma
- Employees: 30 classified 3 unclassified
- Annual budget: $2,333,000 (FY-2019)
- Ministers responsible: Chip Keating, Oklahoma Secretary of Public Safety; Robert Gilliland, Chair of the board
- Agency executive: Tom Bates, Executive director
- Website: www.ppb.ok.gov

The Oklahoma Pardon and Parole Board is the parole board of the state of Oklahoma. The board was created by an amendment to the Oklahoma Constitution in 1944. The Board has the authority to empower the Governor of Oklahoma to grant pardons, paroles, and commutations to people convicted of offenses against the state of Oklahoma.

The board meets each month at one of the State penal institutions.

The mission of the Pardon and Parole Board as a vital part of the criminal justice system is to determine the best possible decision, through a case-by-case investigative process and to protect the public while recommending the supervised released of adult felons. Although, in recent years the board has been mandated to assist with alleviating prison overcrowding, it remains a goal to maintain a low revocation and recidivism rate for the State of Oklahoma.

== Composition ==
The board is composed of five appointed members. Three are appointed by the Governor of Oklahoma, one by the Chief Justice of the Oklahoma Supreme Court, and one by the Presiding Judge of the Oklahoma Court of Criminal Appeals. Board members serve four year terms that run concurrent with the term of the governor.

Any member of the board who is a licensed attorney is prohibited from representing in any Oklahoma court any persons charged with felony offenses.

=== Board membership ===
Name	Appointee type	Term expiration
H. Calvin Prince III	Governor Appointee	January 2027
Edward J. Konieczny	Governor appointee	January 2027
Hon. Richard A. Miller	Oklahoma Criminal Court of Appeals appointee	January 2027
Robert Reavis II	Supreme Court of Oklahoma appointee	January 2027
Kevin Buchanan	Governor appointee	January 2027

== Powers and responsibilities ==
The constitution grants the governor the power to grant commutations, pardons, and paroles for all offenses against the state upon such conditions and with such restrictions and limitations as they may deem appropriate. However, the governor can not exercise these powers unless he submits the name of the individual to the board. The board will then review the applicant for clemency. The board is responsible for making an impartial investigation and study of applicants for clemency.

If a majority of the board votes in favor of the clemency, the governor is empowered to make such acts of clemency for the individual as he deems necessary. Oklahoma is one of only 8 states where the "governor must receive a recommendation from an independent parole board before granting clemency." In the entire history of the state, up to 2021, only 4 clemencies have ever been granted. The board can only make recommendations to the governor regarding parole in the case of convicts sentenced to death or life imprisonment without parole. However, the board may recommend commutations and pardons for such offenses. The board's recommendations for parole for non-violent offenses do not require the approval of the Oklahoma governor, and it becomes final. This is not the case for crimes defined as violent. The board's authority, however, can not limit the governor's power to grant, after conviction, reprieves, or leaves of absence not to exceed sixty days without the consent of the board. In 2015, 4,000 inmates were eligible for parole but the board at the time only recommended 28 offenders for parole and Governor Mary Fallin approved only 6 of those. The board has been sued unsuccessfully in the past for "apparent bias against murderers."

The Oklahoma Legislature's passage of HB 1269 in 2019, marked an update to the board's authority on commutation actions. HB1269 created authority for the board to establish accelerated, single-stage dockets to consider and recommend commutations to the governor, provided certain criteria are met. Accelerated dockets are to be composed of cases in which applicants were serving time for felony convictions that had been subsequently reclassified as misdemeanors, and could be considered in mass, rather than solely on an individual basis.

=== Commutations under HB1269 authority ===
The Pardon and Parole Board considered 814 inmates' cases on November 1, 2019, the first day HB1269 became effective. The board unanimously voted to recommend commutation for 527 Department of Corrections inmates to Governor Kevin Stitt. The action represented the largest number of single-day commutations in the history of the state, nationally according to press reports. After, "more than 200 have been arrested again since then, according to a list kept by the Oklahoma State Bureau of Investigation" as of April 2022. It was the Oklahoma Pardon and Parole Board that "recommended the commutations." However, around "35 were arrested solely because they still had outstanding bench warrants on old cases and not because of any new crimes. One of the old cases dating to 1999."

== Criticism and news ==
=== Conflicts with district attorneys and attorney general ===
In 2014, DAs such as Tim Harris, David Prater, and Mike Fields accused the board of being mismanaged, saying that the current interim director, Tracy George, "is in over her head." Prater, the Oklahoma County DA, had "charged Pardon and Parole Board members with a violation of the Oklahoma Open Meeting Act but dropped the charges after the board acknowledged that it needed to give better public notice when it is considering certain actions." In 2021 Prater filed a lawsuit against the board and governor, implying that two of its members appointed by the governor were biased and too pro-release of inmates. One aspect of the claim was board member Adam Luck's retweet of Kim Kardashian with a tweet of his own that seemed in favor of Julius Jones. This came after previous claims of conflicts of interest for the same two board members, Kelly Doyle and Adam Luck. The previous chair of the board, Steven Bickley, who later resigned, defended his fellow board members. He informed Public Radio Tulsa that "DA Laura Austin Thomas made a blanket request based on Adam Luck and Kelly Doyle’s previous work with organizations that help inmates transition to life outside of prison." Bickley resigned from the pardon and parole board in July 2020 "after board member and retired judge Allen McCall sent him an email accusing him of trying to force an anti-death penalty view on the board." The NAACP has also called for previous board member Allen McCall's resignation. On July 7, 2021, Allen McCall resigned from the board citing he would look for opportunities elsewhere, possibly coaching. He was replaced by Richard Smothermon, a former District Attorney.

In September 2021, the Supreme Court denied District Attorney David Prater's request to remove board members Adam Luck and Kelley Doyle from the board. He made the request before the Julius Jones commutation hearing. David Prater blamed Hollywood and George Soros in a news conference for how the board voted to commute Jones.

David Prater is also behind the first grand jury seated for the first time "in more than two decades" to investigate the Oklahoma County jail and the Oklahoma Pardon and Parole board in late 2021. Those "grand jurors include an Amazon employee, retirees, a real estate worker, a restaurant manager, a utility coordinator and a director at an international ministry." Prater called for an investigation "because inmates have been released from prison by mistake" against Governor Kevin Stitt's criticism, calling it "the latest political stunt to intimidate the Pardon and Parole Board and obstruct the Constitutional process as high-profile cases that his office prosecuted are being considered."

Kelly Doyle was "the target of identical back-to-back lawsuits filed by both Oklahoma County District Attorney David Prater and Attorney General John O'Connor. The pair alleged that Doyle makes money off the release of prisoners because she works at an organization that helps people recently released from prison find jobs." Prater and O’Connor sued and "attempted to remove specific members who voted in favor of Julius Jones." Doyle has requested the costs and attorney's fees associated be covered in response. Kelly Doyle's attorney said that AG O'Connor "knew his application to the Supreme Court was both 'untimely' and 'frivolous', and used the same arguments that Oklahoma County District Attorney David Prater used in a Supreme Court hearing that was held 7 days prior." In March 2022, Kelly Doyle resigned due to the harassment, making the board have entirely new members in the span of less than a year, except for Larry Morris. This came after Adam Luck was asked by Governor Stitt to resign in January 2022. Luck was replaced by Edward Konieczny

Before Luck and Doyle were pressured to resign, Republican Governor Kevin Stitt had expressed full confidence in the board over criticisms from DAs like Steve Kunzweiler who want the board to be more conservative in their considerations for parole and commutation. In the Tulsa World, the DAs were also blamed for taking an increasingly more political role that has "to some degree weakened" the board's influence. This came at the same time that dark money conservative attack ads targeting Stitt as not tough enough on crime began to air, despite Oklahoma incarcerating a "higher percentage of its people than any democracy on earth." According to Prison Policy Initiative, Oklahoma as a state has the third highest incarceration rate in 2021 and in 2018 numbers show it incarcerates the most women per capita. The dark money groups are "spending millions of dollars" that accuse the Republican Governor as "being soft on crime."

In April 2022, Cathy Stocker was chosen to replace Kelly Doyle. Stocker, like Smothermon, is a former DA and also appointed by Governor Kevin Stitt. Stitt's "choice of a former district attorney comes in an election year as Stitt is being accused in TV attack ads of being soft on crime. Many of the ads focus on how many prisoners have been released through commutations recommended by the parole board." Stocker was the only woman on the board, but did not vote at the first meeting she attended. In that same first meeting of April 2022 Smothermon and Konieczny questioned the administrative parole process. Administrative "parole saves Oklahoma $16.7 million a year due to lower incarceration costs" but Konieczny was "critical" and "said the board’s role as a rubber stamp opens it up to litigation.

In August 2022, the board was criticized in a Mother Jones piece for rejecting all mothers with similar cases to Tondalo Hall, who had been wrongfully convicted after being sentenced more harshly than her children's abuser under failure to protect laws. Since Hall's release, the "board has rejected all the other mothers with similar cases who applied for a commutation. Other potential avenues for relief have also closed."

In early 2023, former judge and Assistant District Attorney was appointed by the court to replace Larry Morris. He makes the third member and a majority on the board with associations to DAs. In the past, Miller was charged with a domestic-related misdemeanor, being arrested in 1995 and being accused of bias in domestic cases he oversaw.

In 2025, Tom Bates, the executive director from 2020 to 2025, announced his resignation.

=== 2021-2022 board recommendation controversies ===
In March 2021, a special counsel was hired to investigate complaints about Oklahoma's parole board "in an effort to restore public confidence in its operations." This came after Governor Stitt signed the commutation for Lawrence Paul Anderson, who was released and later confessed to cannibalism, when a previous vote from the board to deny him was meant to end further consideration. This sparked an investigation of the board already feuding "between advocates pushing for criminal justice reform to reduce Oklahoma's high incarceration rates and prosecutors who contend the efforts have gone too far and endanger the public." On July 7, 2021, Allen McCall resigned from the board, replaced by Richard Smothermon, a former district attorney. In November 2022, a new lawsuit Governor Stitt and the board was filed by the families of Anderson's victims, claiming that in an "effort to save money by reducing the incarceration rate, Governor Stitt 'planned to push as many prisoners through the pardon, parole, and commutation process so as to release as many as possible, as quickly as possible.'"

In March 2022, a then all-male board recommended Jimmie Stohler, the Crossbow Killer, a white man, for parole that Stitt at first agreed to but later rescinded. Their recommendation came in the same meeting where they denied a woman, April Wilkens, a hearing. Video shows Larry Morris was the only member to vote for Wilkens to have a 2022 parole hearing. Morris had previously worked with federal judge Clare Eagan, who wrote a 2005 affidavit in support of April Wilkens. It was later uncovered that the current Tulsa District Attorney's office under Steve Kunzweiler protested Wilkens's parole. Steve Kunzewiler's wife donated to the previous Tim Harris DA campaign, who originally prosecuted the case against Wilkens, and Kunzweiler worked under Tim Harris. Wilkens later filed for another attempt at post conviction relief, seeking to have her "conviction vacated, her sentence modified to time served, or a new trial" due to new evidence. Wilkens has been denied parole at least 4 times and commutation twice by the board, and one former juror thought she would be out by now or would have given her a shorter sentence if it were offered. When the Oklahoma Survivors Act was passed, Wilkens was the first to apply, but accused Kunzweiler of dragging out the resentencing process. Former senator Greg Treat spoke out saying "justice delayed is justice denied." Kunzweiler released a statement to media, claiming Terry Carlton had also taken out protective orders against Wilkens, though Channel 8 KTUL could find no evidence that had happened. On September 4, 2025, Tulsa County Judge David Guten decided on the second day of April Wilkens's resentencing hearing that she had not met the burden of proof that her abuse at the hands of Terry Carlton was a substantial contributing factor, though he acknowledged she was a victim of domestic violence. This upset many domestic violence advocates in Tulsa. Fox23 reported in conflicting statements that she would be eligible for parole "tomorrow" as well as "next year" and that her Life sentence was 35 years, which, at the time of her OSA resentencing hearing, she had already served 27 years for.

=== 2022 grand jury investigation findings ===
In May 2022, findings from a grand jury criticized Governor Kevin Stitt for being grossly improper. The board members "met as a group with the governor before their appointment and taking office. At the time, decisions were made about upcoming votes of those members." Such "action violated the spirit of the Open Meetings Act and rendered the future board less than independent." State "law requires the Pardon and Parole Board to publish and distribute to the Legislature annual reports regarding its activities, but jurors found that no such report has been provided since 2018. One Pardon and Parole Board member allegedly objected to the form of the reports." Prater also "used the investigative body to continue working a case that he had begun in front of the state’s multi-county grand jury earlier in 2021. Rep. Terry O’Donnell (R-Catoosa) and his wife, Teresa, were indicted Dec. 17 on a combined seven criminal counts related to his authorship of a bill that legalized her ability to become a state-appointed tag agent in Catoosa." The "investigation into the Pardon and Parole Board began in October," but Prater "was the second prosecutor to be involved in the matter." The jury stated that the board lacks "transparency, objectivity, and for several years, procedures designed as safeguards were ignored in order to speed up the commutation process and to increase the number of commutations that were being heard and recommended." The grand jury also focused on the case of Lawrence Anderson, "who applied for commutation on Jan. 17, 2019, and was denied. He applied seven months later, despite a requirement that he wait three years, and was approved." It was found that at least "one high-level administrator at the Pardon and Parole Board was aware that Anderson had erroneously been approved for a second commutation chance." That Thursday evening that the report came out, Stitt’s office issued a statement saying: "'This is the latest in a string of unfounded hit jobs by the Oklahoma County District Attorney and other political insiders.'" Charlie Hannema, a spokesman for Stitt, said that “Oklahoma law explicitly prohibits grand juries from making allegations that public officials have engaged in misconduct, and it is clear the outgoing prosecutor took advantage of the citizens who served on this grand jury to unwittingly carry out his partisan feud against Governor Stitt and the Pardon and Parole Board.” The report noted that the jury "had no legal authority to accuse the governor of official misconduct, which can only be done in impeachment proceedings." The grand jury pointed out that the board "lacks objective criteria that would guide their commutation decisions and recommended 'a panel of citizens be convened to discuss and promulgate objective criteria that should be considered in the commutation process.'"

Appeals attorney Debbie Hampton stated that, in response to the jury's findings, "It’' just a mess on how the board looks at the offense rather than what an individual has done over the years."

=== 2023 board controversies ===
In 2023, the board denied clemency for Richard Glossip when it had a tied vote because one recused themselves. Instead of a tie weighing in favor of the convicted, it weighs in favor of the state. Randy Bauman, a board member of the Oklahoma Coalition to Abolish the Death Penalty, wrote that it was unfair Glossip did not have all 5 members in his case and pushed back against the idea that the board is a "safety valve" for an unjust and fallible criminal justice system.

In June 2023, former board member Adam Luck spoke out about how he was pressured to not vote the way he wanted to by District Attorneys and those who wanted to maintain their power.

Continuing with the history of high turnover, in July 2023 Cathy Stoker resigned from the board saying that her role was not a "good fit" and Kevin Buchanan, another former district attorney for Washington County and Nowata County from Bartlesville, was appointed by Governor Stitt to replace her. She resigned just before Richard Smothermon did in August 2023 after criticism from Representative Kevin McDugle criticized the board and Smothermon specifically for not giving Richard Glossip five full board votes. Smothermon gave no direct reason for why he resigned, but the Pardon and Parole Board is "currently the target of a lawsuit brought by death-row inmate Richard Glossip after he was denied a clemency recommendation." McDugle said that he would like to see the pardon and parole board "have seven members instead of five and he’s going to work during the next legislative session" toward that goal.

=== 2024 controversies ===
The first ever commutation hearing for someone with a life without parole sentence was for Cathy Lamb. Despite the prosecuting district attorney even advocating for her release, the board has not granted her commutation.

In 2024, Oklahoma state Representative Kevin McDugle said he "believes that members of the Oklahoma District Attorneys Council had improper communications with the Oklahoma Pardon and Parole Board prior to Glossip’s clemency hearing in April 2023." District Attorney Jason Hicks criticized AG Drummond for sharing his views on the case. In other communications revealed, district attorneys referred to Drummond as a “douche” and "complained among themselves that the attorney general had turned Glossip’s clemency hearing into a 'circus'" and that Drummond was vying for a run for governor.

== See also ==
- Governor of Oklahoma
- Parole board
- Pardons in the United States
- William S. Key, served as chairman of the Board following World War I
- Edward Konieczny
- Cathy Stocker
- Richard Smothermon
- David Prater (attorney)
- Larry Morris
