= Richard Smothermon =

United States Attorney

- In office 1991–2021

Richard Smothermon is a current Oklahoma Pardon and Parole Board member and former District Attorney in Oklahoma.

== Career before parole board ==
Smothermon "of Edmond, served 16 years as district attorney for Pottawatomie and Lincoln counties before being tapped to serve as general counsel for the Oklahoma State Bureau of Investigation." He retired in May 2021. He was the 2010 "incumbent from District 23 that includes Pottawatomie and Lincoln Counties" who faced "a challenge by former district attorney Bill Roberson. Roberson, 66, served as district attorney for District 23 from 1983 until 1991." Smothermon was 44 years old when he sought reelection.

In 2015, Smothermon handled a report from the Oklahoma State Bureau of Investigations "on whether a Shawnee City Commissioner tried to bribe another commissioner." In 2018, Smothermon ruled that a "U.S. Marshal and an Oklahoma drug agent involved in the fatal shooting of a prison escapee were both justified in using deadly force." In 2019, he was involved in the "agreement regarding approximately 20 acres of land known as the Mission Hill property. Pottawatomie County Commissioners conveyed the property to Citizen Potawatomi Nation."

== Parole board ==
In 2021, Richard Smothermon replaced Comanche County Judge Allen McCall on the pardon and parole board. McCall had "been on the Board since 2017, and had been openly oppositional to reform efforts, as well as to former Pardon and Parole Board Director Steve Bickley." McCall, as well as Smothermon, were appointed by the Oklahoma Supreme Court." Smothermon was the sole former-DA on the board until he was later followed by a second former-DA in 2022, Cathy Stocker, appointed by Governor Kevin Stitt. The Governor's choice of another former district attorney came "in an election year as Stitt is being accused in TV attack ads of being soft on crime." The ads "focus on how many prisoners have been released through commutations recommended by the parole board." Lawrence Paul Anderson's commuted sentence, approved by the governor, is one example of a case being used in attacks on the board and governor, but Smothermon "was not on the board when Anderson’s sentence was commuted." The Board took criticisms from current DAs like Steve Kunzweiler, who want the board to be more conservative in their considerations for parole and commutation. In the Tulsa World, DAs were also blamed for taking an increasingly more political role that has "to some degree weakened" the board's influence.

In 2021, Smothermon voted against clemency for Julius Jones. Smothermon's concern focused on a recent “misconduct” violation Jones received while in prison. In 2022, he voted against giving April Wilkens a parole hearing. However, the board recommended the Crossbow Killer, Jimmie Stohler, be granted a full parole recommendation in the same meeting. Smothermon had voted to deny clemency to every death row inmate until August 2022, except for Richard Glossip, where Smothermon recused himself due to his wife being the prosecutor on the case. On August 3, 2022, Smothermon voted for clemency on his first death row inmate for James Coddington.

In June 2023, Randy Bauman, a board member of the Oklahoma Coalition to Abolish the Death Penalty, wrote that it was unfair Richard Glossip did not have all 5 members in his case and pushed back against the idea that the board is a "safety valve" for an unjust and fallible criminal justice system. Instead of a tie weighing in favor of the convicted, it weighs in favor of the state. The vote had tied because Smothermon recused himself. Instead of a tie weighing in favor of the convicted, it weighs in favor of the state. Ed Konieczny and Calvin Prince voted for clemency, while Cathy Stocker and Richard Miller voted no. His spouse, Connie Smothermon had been the prosecutor on the Glossip case. Representative Kevin McDugle has called for Connie Smothermon to face charges in her handling of the case. McDugle has been outspoken against the district attorneys in Oklahoma for not wanting lookbacks on their cases and the mishandling of the case, holding a press conference in the Oklahoma House of Representatives which called out DAs before the supreme court issued a stay.

In July 2023, Cathy Stoker resigned from the board saying that her role was not a "good fit" and another former district attorney Kevin Buchanan, for Washington County and Nowata County from Bartlesville, was appointed by Governor Stitt to replace her. She resigned just before Richard Smothermon did in August 2023 after criticism from Representative Kevin McDugle. He criticized the board and Smothermon specifically for not giving Richard Glossip five full board votes. Smothermon gave no direct reason for why he resigned, but the Pardon and Parole Board is "currently the target of a lawsuit brought by death-row inmate Richard Glossip after he was denied a clemency recommendation." McDugle said that he would like to see the pardon and parole board "have seven members instead of five and he’s going to work during the next legislative session" toward that goal.

== See also ==
- List of district attorneys by county
- Oklahoma Pardon and Parole Board
- Richard Glossip
- Cathy Stocker
- Edward J. Konieczny
