= Napue v. Illinois =

- Supreme Court of the United States

Argued April 30, 1959 Decided June 15, 1959
- Full case name: Henry Napue, Petitioner, v. Illinois
- Citations: 360 U.S. 264 (more) 79 S. Ct. 1173; 3 L. Ed. 2d 1217; 1959 U.S. LEXIS 811

Case history
- Prior: Petition for post-conviction relief denied (Criminal Court of Cook County, Illinois). Affirmed sub nom. Napue v. People, 13 Ill. 2d 566, 150 N. E. 2d 613 (1958).

Holding
- The knowing use of false testimony by a prosecutor in a criminal case, including testimony affecting only the credibility of a witness and which does not directly touch on the innocence or guilt of a defendant, violates the Due Process Clause of the Fourteenth Amendment to the United States Constitution.

Court membership
- Chief Justice Earl Warren Associate Justices Hugo Black · Felix Frankfurter; William O. Douglas · Tom C. Clark; John M. Harlan II · William J. Brennan Jr. Charles E. Whittaker · Potter Stewart

Case opinion
- Majority: Warren, joined by unanimous

Napue v. Illinois, 360 U.S. 264 (1959), was a United States Supreme Court case in which the Court held that the knowing use of false testimony by a prosecutor in a criminal case violates the Due Process Clause of the Fourteenth Amendment to the United States Constitution, even if the testimony affects only the credibility of the witness and does not directly relate to the innocence or guilt of the defendant.

== Background ==
=== Prior case law ===
The Due Process Clause of the Fourteenth Amendment to the United States Constitution provides:

[N]or shall any State deprive any person of life, liberty, or property, without due process of law ...

The Supreme Court of the United States has repeatedly addressed whether the Due Process Clause of the Fourteenth Amendment is violated when prosecutors knowingly use false testimony in a criminal trial. In 1935, the Supreme Court briefly wrote in Mooney v. Holohan that prosecutors violate the Due Process Clause if they knowingly present perjured testimony. The Court expanded on its decision in 1957 in the case Alcorta v. Texas, in which it held that a prosecutor's neglect to correct false testimony is equivalent to knowingly presenting perjured testimony. However, in Alcorta, the Court refrained from setting a specific standard regarding when false testimony becomes material enough to warrant reversal of a conviction.

=== Proceedings in state court ===
Henry Napue was tried in an Illinois state court on charges of murder. At his trial, the prosecution's primary witness, George Hamer, who was serving a 199-year sentence for the same murder, testified that the prosecution had not offered any reduction of sentence or other reward for his testimony. The prosecutor did not dispute or otherwise correct Hamer's testimony. Based primarily on Hamer's testimony, Napue was convicted and sentenced to 199 years in prison.

After Napue's conviction, the Assistant State's Attorney who prosecuted the murder filed a petition to reduce Hamer's sentence. In the petition, the Assistant State's Attorney wrote that he had "promised" to Hamer that "a recommendation for a reduction of his [Hamer's] sentence would be made and, if possible, effectuated" if he agreed to cooperate by testifying against Napue and several other defendants. The petition referred to the agreement to seek a lower sentence for Hamer as a "compact entered into between the duly authorized representatives of the State of Illinois and George Hamer", and noted that Hamer testified only after being given "definite assurance" of a recommendation for a lower sentence.

Napue subsequently filed a post-conviction petition asking for reversal of his conviction, arguing that Hamer's testimony that he was not promised a lower sentence was false, and that Assistant State's Attorney's knowing failure to correct Hamer's statement rendered Napue's conviction unconstitutional. The trial court held a hearing at which the Assistant State's Attorney testified that he had only promised to help Hamer if Hamer's assertion that he was just a reluctant participant in the murder was true. The Assistant State's Attorney went on to testify that there was no promise to reduce Hamer's sentence if Hamer testified, and that his petition to lower Hamer's sentence used language that "[he] should not have used". On the basis of the Assistant State's Attorney's testimony, the trial court denied the petition to overturn Napue's conviction.

Napue appealed to the Supreme Court of Illinois, which affirmed the denial of Napue's petition with two justices dissenting. The Supreme Court of Illinois disagreed with the trial court and found that the Assistant State's Attorney had promised Hamer a recommendation for sentence reduction, and that the Assistant State's Attorney knew that Hamer was lying by testifying to the contrary. However, it held that because a public defender had testified that he would try to reduce Hamer's sentence, the jury was aware that Hamer would be trying to reduce his sentence, and that accordingly, Hamer was not entitled to relief.

== Supreme Court ==
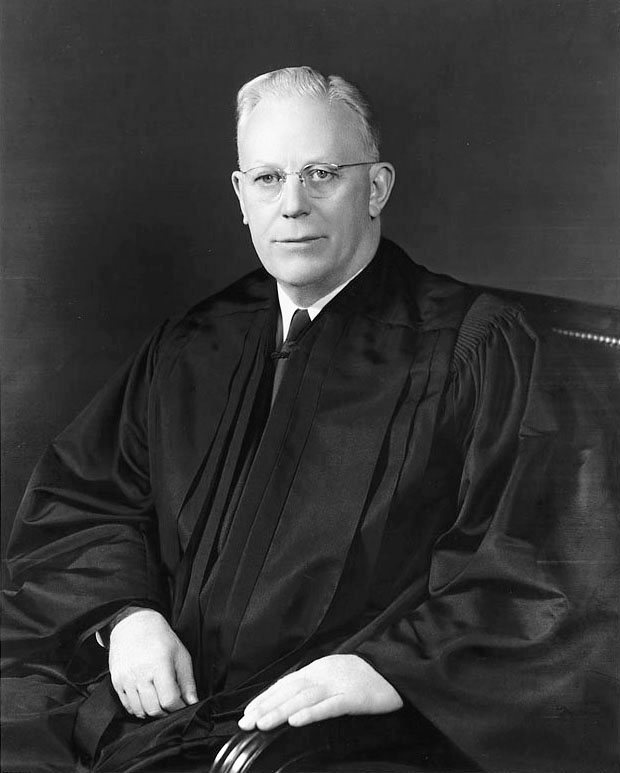
Chief Justice Warren delivered the opinion of the Court

Napue asked the Supreme Court to review the case, which granted certiorari. Chief Justice Earl Warren delivered the opinion for a unanimous Court. The Court held that because the credibility of a witness can often be critical in the jury's verdict a prosecutor's knowing failure to correct false testimony violates the Fourteenth Amendment even when the testimony presented affects only the credibility of the witness and does not directly relate to the innocence or guilt of the defendant. The Court further held that the false testimony must be corrected by the prosecution whether the prosecutor actively sought false testimony or simply allows it to occur. The Court reiterated that prosecutors have a duty to seek to correct false testimony when it occurs in order for a trial to be fair, and held that any false testimony allowed by the prosecutor that may affect the outcome of trial creates a violation of due process rights protected by the Fourteenth Amendment to the United States Constitution.

Applying those standards to Napue's case, the Court held that because the prosecution knowingly failed to correct false testimony made by its witness that "may have had an effect on the outcome of the trial", Napue's due process rights had been violated. The Court accordingly reversed Napue's conviction.

== Subsequent developments ==
After Napue, in 1963, the Supreme Court decided Brady v. Maryland, a landmark case in which the Court held that Due Process Clause requires prosecutors to disclose all exculpatory evidence to the defendant. In 1972, the Court decided in Giglio v. United States that it is a due process violation if a prosecutor fails to correct perjured testimony if the prosecutor's office was aware of the lie, even if the individual prosecutor in the courtroom was not. In Giglio, the Court also decided the threshold for materiality for Napue claims, holding: "A new trial is required if the false testimony could [...] in any reasonable likelihood have affected the judgment of the jury".
