= Cathy Stocker =

United States Attorney

Personal details
- Party: Republican
- Education: University of Oklahoma College of Law

Cathy Stocker is a former District Attorney for Blaine, Canadian, Garfield, Grant and Kingfisher counties in Oklahoma for 28 years before retiring in 2010, and a former member of the Oklahoma Pardon and Parole Board.

== Career ==
As district attorney, Stocker served on a task force that developed "various projects to increase awareness of domestic violence issues, to improve enforcement and prosecution of domestic violence laws and to provide services to those who suffer from domestic violence." Stocker and her staff "implemented a domestic violence prosecution program in Canadian and Garfield Counties" and also "implemented the Garfield County Drug Court."

She was "a founding member of the Garfield County Child Advocacy Council" and "an appointed member of the Oklahoma Ethics Commission," serving as chair multiple times. Stocker was the District Attorney during the Saundra Kay Medlin case, which was later overturned. Medlin argued battered woman syndrome, was sentenced to four years, but was later exonerated. At the time, Stocker said "her office was 'ready to vigorously pursue [Medlin's] case.'" In 2007, Stocker’s office protested "the early release of 19 of the 22 inmates with convictions in her district seeking clemency from the state Pardon and Parole Board."

In March 2022, Stocker was chosen by Governor Kevin Stitt for the Oklahoma Pardon and Parole Board. Stocker resigned from her position on the Oklahoma Ethics Commission, to take the parole board appointment. She replaced Kelly Doyle, who resigned from the parole board the previous month. Stocker was the only woman on the board.

At her first pardon and parole board hearing, Stocker did not participate in voting. In June 2023, Stocker voted against clemency for Richard Glossip, an inmate on death row at Oklahoma State Penitentiary. In July 2023, Stoker resigned from the board saying that her role was not a "good fit" with the rest of her life obligations.

== See also ==
- List of district attorneys by county
- Oklahoma Pardon and Parole Board
- Richard Smothermon
- Edward J. Konieczny
- Larry Morris
