= Glossip v. Chandler =

United States federal court case

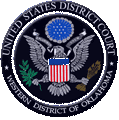
- Court: United States District Court for the Western District of Oklahoma
- Full case name: Richard Glossip, et al., Plaintiffs, v. Randy Chandler, et al., Defendants.
- Docket nos.: CIV-14-665-F

Case history
- Related action: Glossip v. Gross (2015)

Court membership
- Judge sitting: Stephen P. Friot

Glossip v. Chandler is a United States District Court for the Western District of Oklahoma case in which the plaintiffs challenged the State of Oklahoma's execution protocol. The initial lawsuit, Glossip v. Gross, rose to the United States Supreme Court in 2015 at the preliminary injunction stage and involved an earlier version of Oklahoma's lethal injection protocol. The case was reopened in the District Court in 2020 following an end to Oklahoma's moratorium on executions.

== Background ==
=== Execution of Clayton Lockett ===
In 2014, Oklahoma's lethal injection protocol came under scrutiny when Clayton Lockett died of a heart attack resulting from complications during his execution. Lockett was convicted of the 1999 kidnapping, rape, and murder of a 19-year-old woman. In 2015, Lockett and other death row inmates had unsuccessfully challenged an Oklahoma law allowing the names of companies supplying drugs used in executions to be kept secret in Glossip v. Gross. Lockett was scheduled to be executed on April 29, 2014, and after doctors had declared him unconscious, Lockett attempted to raise his head and speak and complained of a burning sensation. Lockett started convulsing after receiving a round of lethal drug injections. Governor Fallin asked the Department of Corrections to conduct a full review of the state's execution procedures. Autopsy reports indicated that Oklahoma State Penitentiary officials had used potassium acetate instead of potassium chloride and that Lockett had died of a heart attack during the execution.

=== Initial lawsuit Glossip v. Gross ===
On June 25, 2014, twenty-one Oklahoma death row inmates filed a lawsuit, Charles F. Warner, et al., v. Kevin J. Gross, et al., in the United States District Court for the Western District of Oklahoma. The lawsuit claimed that Oklahoma's execution protocol was unconstitutional, stating that there is autopsy evidence suggesting that the drugs used in lethal injection make people feel as though they are drowning through a "flash pulmonary edema" and like they are being "burned alive" violating the Eighth and Fourteenth amendments of the U.S. Constitution. Richard Glossip replaced Charles Frederick Warner as the named plaintiff after Warner was executed in January 2015 before the case was decided.

The lawsuit advanced to the United States Supreme Court, and on June 29, 2015, the justices ruled 5–4 in Glossip v. Gross that the prisoners had not shown that they would be subject to an unconstitutional level of pain. The court also ruled that death row inmates challenging their execution method must present a known and available alternative. The executions of Richard Glossip, John Grant, and Benjamin Cole Sr. were stayed by the court. The lawsuit was then returned to the United States District Court for the Western District of Oklahoma. Following the Supreme Court's ruling, in October 2015 state officials imposed an execution moratorium, and the case was administratively closed by agreement for an indefinite period of time to permit the state to investigate and amend its execution procedures.

=== Execution of Charles Frederick Warner ===
On January 15, 2015, Charles Frederick Warner was executed. On September 30, 2015, in investigations surrounding the planned execution of Richard Glossip, it became apparent that potassium acetate may have been used to execute Warner. After his execution, the drug vials and syringes used in Warner's execution were submitted to the Office of Chief Medical Examiner. On October 8, 2015, it was reported that, contrary to protocol, the Oklahoma Department of Corrections officials had used potassium acetate to execute Warner on January 15, 2015. An attorney representing Glossip and other Oklahoma death row inmates said logs from Warner's execution initialed by a prison staff member indicated the use of potassium chloride; however, an autopsy report showed twelve vials of potassium acetate were used.

=== Planned execution of Richard Glossip ===
Oklahoma planned to execute Richard Glossip on September 30, 2015. Officials discovered that they had been delivered the drug potassium acetate instead of potassium chloride, which had been used in the botched execution of Lockett. After learning of the discrepancy, Governor of Oklahoma Mary Fallin called off Glossip's execution with a last-minute, indefinite stay, claiming it was a precaution since the doctor and pharmacist working with the Department of Corrections agreed that potassium chloride and potassium acetate were medically interchangeable. Scott Pruitt, Oklahoma Attorney General at the time, ordered a multicounty grand jury investigation of the execution drug error.

=== Moratorium ===
The several botched executions resulted in a moratorium on executions in Oklahoma from October 2015 until 2021. On February 13, 2020, Oklahoma announced plans to resume executions in a press conference attended by Governor Kevin Stitt, Oklahoma Attorney General Michael J. Hunter and Department of Corrections Director Scott Crow. Stitt stated that "It is important that the state is implementing our death penalty law with a procedure that is humane and swift for those convicted of the most heinous of crimes, and claimed that Oklahoma had found a "reliable supply of drugs" to resume lethal injections.

== Reopening of lawsuit ==
Following the end of the moratorium, on February 27, 2020, more than two dozen inmates filed a motion to reopen the case, claiming the new lethal injection protocol was incomplete. Although the case had been before the United States Supreme Court at the preliminary injunction stage, that had involved an earlier version of Oklahoma's lethal injection protocol. On March 19, 2020, the case was officially reopened. The plaintiffs claimed the sedative midazolam, one of three drugs administered during Oklahoma's execution process, causes fluid to quickly build up in the lungs, creating a feeling of suffocation. They also claimed that a second drug, potassium chloride, causes extreme pain "similar to being burned alive" if the person being executed maintains consciousness. The State of Oklahoma claimed that the previously botched executions were caused by inadequate training and relaxed protocols. The State claimed the protocols and training have since been updated and corrected.

In May 2020, the Attorney General of Oklahoma told the court it would not set execution dates for any of the prisoners named in the lawsuit. On July 6, 2020, a third amended complaint was filed in the case and the case name was changed to Richard Glossip, et al., v. Randy Chandler et al.. This amended complaint challenges the state's new execution protocol.

In August 2021, United States District Court for the Western District of Oklahoma Judge Stephen Friot dismissed parts of the Third Amended Complaint, ruling that because six inmates had not specified an alternative execution method to lethal injection, they could no longer be included in the lawsuit. Several of the inmates refused to choose an alternative method of execution based on religious grounds. Following their removal from the lawsuit, the Oklahoma Court of Criminal Appeals set execution dates for five of the former plaintiffs, including John Grant, Julius Jones, Donald Grant, Gilbert Postelle, and James Coddington. The remaining twenty-six plaintiffs were allowed to proceed on challenges to Oklahoma's execution protocol under the United States Constitution, the Oklahoma Constitution and other laws.

On October 15, 2021, United States Court of Appeals for the Tenth Circuit ruled that the lower court made a mistake by dismissing the six prisoners from the lawsuit. Despite the former attorney general's earlier commitment to stay execution dates for plaintiffs in the lawsuit, his successor, John M. O'Connor, moved forward with scheduling dates, and John Grant was executed on October 28, 2021. An autopsy showed that John Grant suffered a flash pulmonary edema, which is a rapid build-up of fluid creating the feeling of suffocation or drowning. In addition to the edema, John Grant experienced intramuscular hemorrhaging and aspirated on his vomit as a direct result of the lethal injection.

Following the botched October 2021 execution of John Grant, four Oklahoma death row inmates who had scheduled execution dates, Gilbert Postelle, Julius Jones, Wade Lay, and Donald Grant, sued for an injunction. They argued that Oklahoma officials had not resolved concerns about the state's execution method and asked that their executions be stayed until a hearing could be held on February 28, 2022. In November 2021, the United States Court of Appeals for the Tenth Circuit rejected the inmates' request to intervene. On January 27, 2022, the day Donald Grant was scheduled to be executed, Donald Grant and Gilbert Postelle requested an emergency stay of execution from the United States Supreme Court which was denied. Donald Grant was executed by lethal injection and declared dead at 10:16 a.m CST. On February 17, 2022, Postelle was executed by lethal injection and was pronounced dead at 10:14 a.m. CST.

== See also ==
- Glossip v. Gross (2015)
- Execution of Clayton Lockett
- Execution of John Grant
- Execution of Joseph Wood
- List of botched executions
