= David Prater (attorney) =

United States Attorney

Edmond, Oklahoma associate municipal judge
- Incumbent
- Assumed office July 1, 2025
- Preceded by: Jerry J. Crabb

Oklahoma County District Attorney
- In office January 2007 – January 2, 2023
- Preceded by: Wes Lane
- Succeeded by: Vicki Behenna

Personal details
- Party: Democratic Party
- Education: University of Oklahoma

David Prater is an American attorney, judge, and politician who most notably served as the district attorney for Oklahoma County between 2007 and 2023. He currently serves as the associate municipal judge for Edmond, Oklahoma since 2025.

During his tenure, he gained significant attention for his criticism of the Oklahoma Pardon and Parole Board, prosecuting protestors during the George Floyd protests in Oklahoma City, and leading the initial corruption investigation into Terry O'Donnell.

== Early life ==
Prater was hired by the Cleveland County Sheriff's Office when he was 19 and he joined the Norman Police Department at the age of 20. He went on to graduate from the University of Oklahoma and the University of Oklahoma College of Law. From 1993 to 2001, he was an assistant district attorney under Robert H. Macy and an assistant attorney general under Drew Edmondson. He was sworn is a Democratic district attorney for Oklahoma County in 2007.

== Oklahoma County District Attorney ==
Prater served 16 years as district attorney, planning to retire in 2023. In 2022, Mark Myles is running for his seat.

In September 2021, David Prater blamed Hollywood and George Soros in a news conference for how the board voted to commute the sentence of Julius Jones, an American murderer and former death row inmate. That same year, activists including the NAACP sought a grand jury to investigate Prater, complaining "he has illegally violated Jones' constitutional rights because of race." Also, they alleged "he has filed frivolous legal actions and made public statements intended to intimidate the Oklahoma Pardon and Parole Board from giving Jones a fair hearing." This came after Prater requested a grand jury to investigate the Pardon and Parole Board alongside the Oklahoma County Jail. The petition for a grand jury against Prater was also for his choice to press terrorism charges against protestors involved in the May 2020 George Floyd protests in Oklahoma City.

In June 2025, Prater was appointed as an associate municipal judge for the City of Edmond, Oklahoma. The Edmond City Council unanimously approved his appointment during their meeting.

== See also ==
- List of district attorneys by county
- Oklahoma Pardon and Parole Board
