= Killers of the Flower Moon =

2023 film by Martin Scorsese

- Theatrical release poster
- Directed by: Martin Scorsese
- Screenplay by: Eric Roth; Martin Scorsese
- Based on: Killers of the Flower Moon by David Grann
- Produced by: Dan Friedkin; Bradley Thomas; Martin Scorsese; Daniel Lupi
- Starring: Leonardo DiCaprio; Robert De Niro; Lily Gladstone; Jesse Plemons
- Cinematography: Rodrigo Prieto
- Edited by: Thelma Schoonmaker
- Music by: Robbie Robertson
- Production companies: Apple Studios; Imperative Entertainment; Sikelia Productions; Appian Way Productions
- Distributed by: Paramount Pictures; Apple TV+ (Note: Split distribution between Paramount Pictures and Apple TV+; Paramount only handled the theatrical and VOD release, while Apple exclusively handles the SVOD release.)
- Release dates: May 20, 2023 (Cannes); October 20, 2023 (United States)
- Running time: 206 minutes
- Country: United States
- Languages: English; Osage
- Budget: $200–215 million
- Box office: $158.8 million

Killers of the Flower Moon (Note: Osage: 𐓨𐓣͘𐓪͘𐓬𐓘 𐓡𐓧𐓘𐓮𐓤𐓘 𐓻𐓣͘𐓤𐓘 𐓲'𐓟𐓵𐓟, Mihopa hlaska žika c'eðe The Osage title appears on screen at the end of the film, before the English one.) is a 2023 American historical anti-western epic film directed by Martin Scorsese, who co-wrote the screenplay with Eric Roth, based on the 2017 nonfiction book. It stars Leonardo DiCaprio, Robert De Niro, Lily Gladstone, and Jesse Plemons. Set in 1920s Oklahoma, it focuses on a series of murders of Osage members and relations in the Osage Nation after oil was discovered on tribal land. The tribal members had retained mineral rights on their reservation, but a corrupt local political boss sought to steal the wealth. It is the sixth feature film collaboration between Scorsese and DiCaprio, the tenth between Scorsese and De Niro, and the eleventh and final between Scorsese and composer Robbie Robertson, who died two months before the film's release and to whom the film is dedicated.

Development began in March 2016 when Imperative Entertainment won the adaptation rights to the book. Scorsese and DiCaprio were attached to the film in 2017, with production expected to begin in early 2018. Following several pushbacks and delays due to the COVID-19 pandemic, production was scheduled to start in February 2021, with Apple Studios confirmed to finance and distribute the film alongside Paramount Pictures. Principal photography ultimately took place between April and October 2021 in Osage and Washington counties, Oklahoma. With its $200–215 million budget, it was reportedly the largest amount ever spent on a film shoot in Oklahoma, and was a box-office failure with a gross of $158.8 million.

Killers of the Flower Moon premiered at the 76th Cannes Film Festival on May 20, 2023. It was theatrically released in the United States on October 20, by Paramount Pictures, before streaming on Apple TV+ in January 2024, and received positive reviews. The film won Best Film at the National Board of Review and was named one of the top-ten films of 2023 by the American Film Institute. It was also nominated for ten Academy Awards (including Best Picture), seven Golden Globe Awards (including Best Motion Picture), nine British Academy Film Awards (including Best Film), and three SAG Awards. For her performance, Gladstone won the Golden Globe and Screen Actors Guild Award for Best Actress, and she received a nomination for the Academy Award for Best Actress.

== Plot ==
Osage Nation elders bury a ceremonial pipe, mourning their descendants' assimilation into White American society. Wandering through their Oklahoma reservation during the annual "flower moon" phenomenon of fields of blooms, several Osage find oil gushing from the ground. The tribe becomes wealthy as it retains mineral rights. However, the law requires court-appointed white legal guardians to manage the money of full and half-blood members, assuming them "incompetent". (Note: The federal Burke Act (1906) led to the creation of conservatorships for "incompetent Indians" that required white legal guardians to manage the affairs of Native American wards. All Native Americans with a blood quantum of one-half or more were required to have a court-appointed guardian. Ostensibly set up to protect tribal members, the guardianships became the basis of widespread exploitation of them by white people instead. Appointments historically continued into the 1930s.)

In 1919, Ernest Burkhart returns from World War I to live with his brother Byron and uncle William King Hale on Hale's reservation ranch. Hale, a reserve deputy sheriff and cattle rancher, poses as a friendly benefactor to the Osage. Ernest and Byron commit armed robbery against the Osage. Ernest develops a romance with Mollie Kyle, an Osage whose family owns oil headrights. They marry in an Osage ceremony with Catholic elements and raise three children. Hale contracts the killing of multiple wealthy Osage, explaining that Ernest will inherit more headrights the more of Mollie's family dies. Mollie is diabetic, and her mother, Lizzie, is ill. After Mollie's sister Minnie dies of a mysterious illness, Hale orders Byron to kill another of Mollie's sisters, Anna. Lizzie and the Osage council blame the white residents and urge the tribe to fight back. The 1921 Tulsa race massacre causes further concern amongst the Osage that they could suffer similarly. Lizzie's ancestors welcome her to the afterlife as she dies. Hale has Ernest arrange the murder of Mollie's first husband, Henry Roan, but Ernest's hitman neglects to make the murder look like a suicide as instructed. Even so, the sheriff and judges are in Hale's pocket, so there are no investigations. An Osage Nation representative seeking to lobby Congress is murdered in Washington, D.C. Mollie hires private detective William J. Burns, but he is severely beaten by Ernest and Byron.

Again at Hale's behest, Ernest arranges the bombing of the home of Mollie's last surviving sister, Reta, and her husband, Bill. As the last surviving member of her family, Mollie inherits their headrights. She travels to Washington and asks President Calvin Coolidge for help. Hale orders Ernest to poison Mollie's insulin to "slow her down". Mollie's condition worsens, and Ernest exhibits similar symptoms after also ingesting the poison. Bureau of Investigation Agent Thomas Bruce White Sr. and his assistants discover the truth. Hale tries to cover his tracks by murdering his hitmen, but White arrests Hale and Ernest. Two agents find Mollie near death and rush her to the hospital, where it is found that she has been repeatedly poisoned. She recovers.

White persuades Ernest to confess and turn state's evidence against his uncle. Hale's attorney, W. S. Hamilton, tries to convince Ernest to claim he was tortured and recant. After his daughter dies of whooping cough, Ernest testifies, wanting to be around for his remaining family. Mollie leaves Ernest after he refuses to admit to poisoning her.

A radio drama years later reveals the Shoun brothers were implicated in other "wasting deaths" but never prosecuted due to lack of evidence; Byron was tried as an accomplice to Anna's murder but served no prison time due to a hung jury; (Note: In addition, Byron, also known as Bryan, had his charges dropped after he turned state's evidence against Kelsie (aka Kelsey) Morrison.) Hale and Ernest were sentenced to life imprisonment but later paroled despite Osage protests; and Mollie died of diabetes-related complications in 1937 at the age of 50, her obituary stating that she was buried with her parents, sisters, and daughter while making no mention of the Osage murders.

== Cast ==
- Leonardo DiCaprio as Ernest Burkhart, a World War I veteran
- Robert De Niro as William King Hale, Ernest's uncle
- Lily Gladstone as Mollie Burkhart, Ernest's wife
- Jesse Plemons as Thomas Bruce White Sr., a BOI agent leading the murder investigation
- Tantoo Cardinal as Lizzie Q, Mollie's mother
- John Lithgow as Peter Leaward, the lead prosecutor in the trials of Hale and Burkhart
- Brendan Fraser as W. S. Hamilton, Hale's attorney
- Cara Jade Myers as Anna, Mollie's first sister
- JaNae Collins as Reta, Mollie's second sister
- Jillian Dion as Minnie, Mollie's third sister
- Jason Isbell as Bill Smith, Minnie's and later Reta's husband
- William Belleau as Henry Roan, Mollie's first husband and close friend and later victim of Hale
- Louis Cancelmi as Kelsie Morrison, an acquaintance and accomplice of Burkhart and Hale
- Scott Shepherd as Byron Burkhart, Ernest's younger brother
- Brent Langdon as Barney McBride, a white oilman who travels to Washington, D.C., to seek federal help in solving the murders
- Everett Waller as Paul Red Eagle
- Talee Redcorn as Non-Hon-Zhin-Ga (Note: "Nonhonzhinga" is translated as medicine man.) / Traditional Leader
- Yancey Red Corn as Chief Bonnicastle
- Tatanka Means as John Wren, a Native American undercover BOI agent
- Tommy Schultz as Blackie Thompson
- Sturgill Simpson as Henry Grammer
- Ty Mitchell as John Ramsey
- Gary Basaraba as William J. Burns, a detective
- Charlie Musselwhite as Alvin Reynolds, an agent
- Samuel French as CJ Robinson, an agent
- Pat Healy as John Burger
- Steve Witting as Dr. James Shoun
- Steve Routman as Dr. David Shoun
- Gene Jones as Pitts Beatty
- Michael Abbott Jr. as Frank Smith, an agent
- J.C. Mackenzie as radio announcer
- Jack White as radio show actor
- Larry Sellers as Non-Hon-Zhin-Ga
- Barry Corbin as Undertaker Turton
- Randy Houser as Scott Mathis
- Pete Yorn as Acie Kirby, explosives expert
- Katherine Willis as Myrtle Hale
- Jennifer Rader as Sara Butler
- Ben Hall as Sara's murderer
- Candice Costello as Catherine Cole
- Norma Jean as Vera, Mollie's housekeeper
- Sarah Spurger as Martha, a nanny
- Joshua Close as Horace Burkhart
- Elden Henson as Duke Burkhart
- Anthony J. Harvey as Charlie Whitehorn
- Steve Eastin as Judge John Calvin Pollock
- Larry Fessenden as radio voice (for Hale)
- Martin Scorsese as radio show producer
- Vince Giordano as radio show bandleader
- David Born as Kelsie's lawyer

== Themes ==
The analysis of the themes in the book and film has centered on the difference between Killers of the Flower Moon and traditional Westerns in the old Hollywood tradition. Jorge Cotte of The Nation stated: "Unlike the visions of unbounded freedom found in traditional westerns, Martin Scorsese's new film is a study of a West bounded by the vertical geometry of oil rigs and the violent conspiracies of powerful men."

Cotte then indicated the thematic differences between the book version and the film version of Scorsese's film, stating: "At the center of Grann's book is a set of unsolved crimes: a slew of unsolved murders, then called the 'Reign of Terror', that tormented the Osage from 1921 to 1926, and the corresponding emergence of a Bureau of Investigation (the eventual FBI) that finally arrives to determine who is doing the murdering. The book is meticulously researched and as diligent in setting the context for these shocking acts as it is in examining J. Edgar Hoover's role in shaping the bureau and using the murders as a showcase for it... Scorsese's retelling ends up being narrower in focus. It does away with much of the original's sense of suspense and Hoover's role in the investigation, and instead focuses on how an individual descends, through greed, complicity, and cowardice, into unforgivable acts of despoliation and violence."

Niles Schwartz's review focuses on the film's theological dimensions, as well as the overarching theme of human greed undermining our society's ideals.

== Production ==
=== Development ===
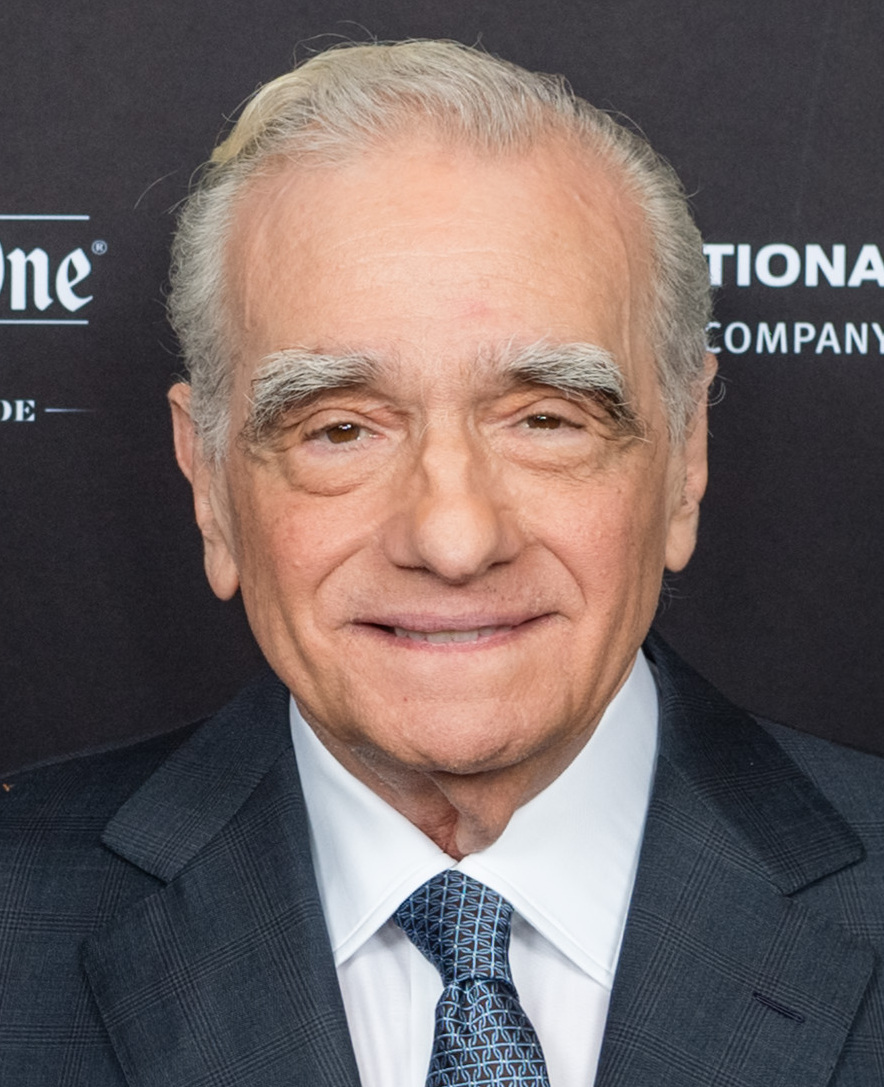
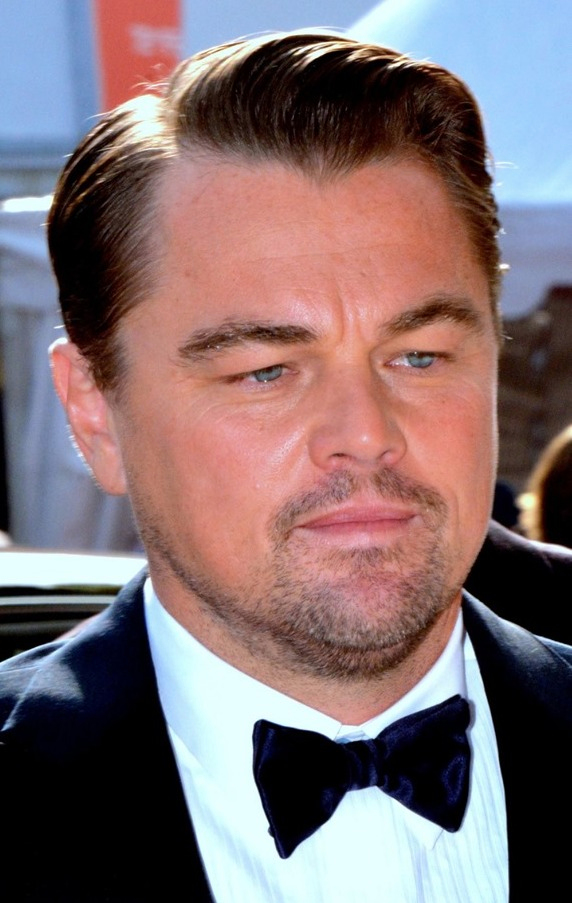
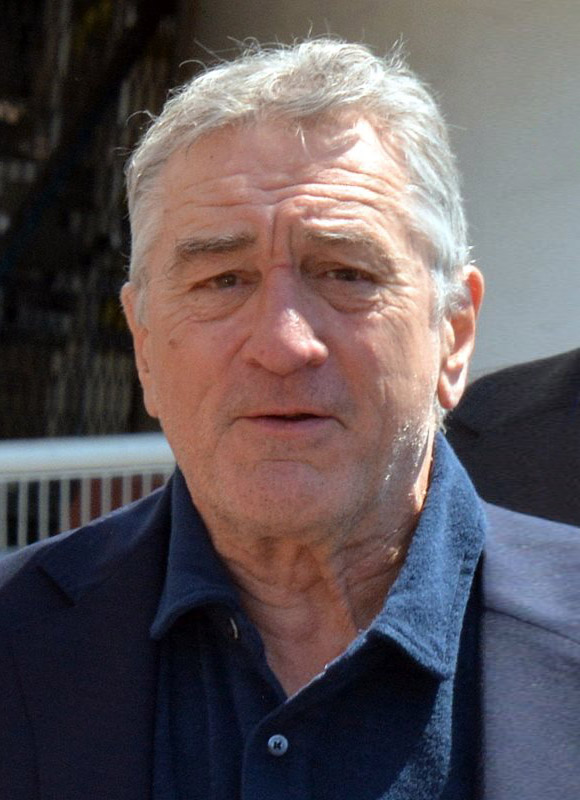
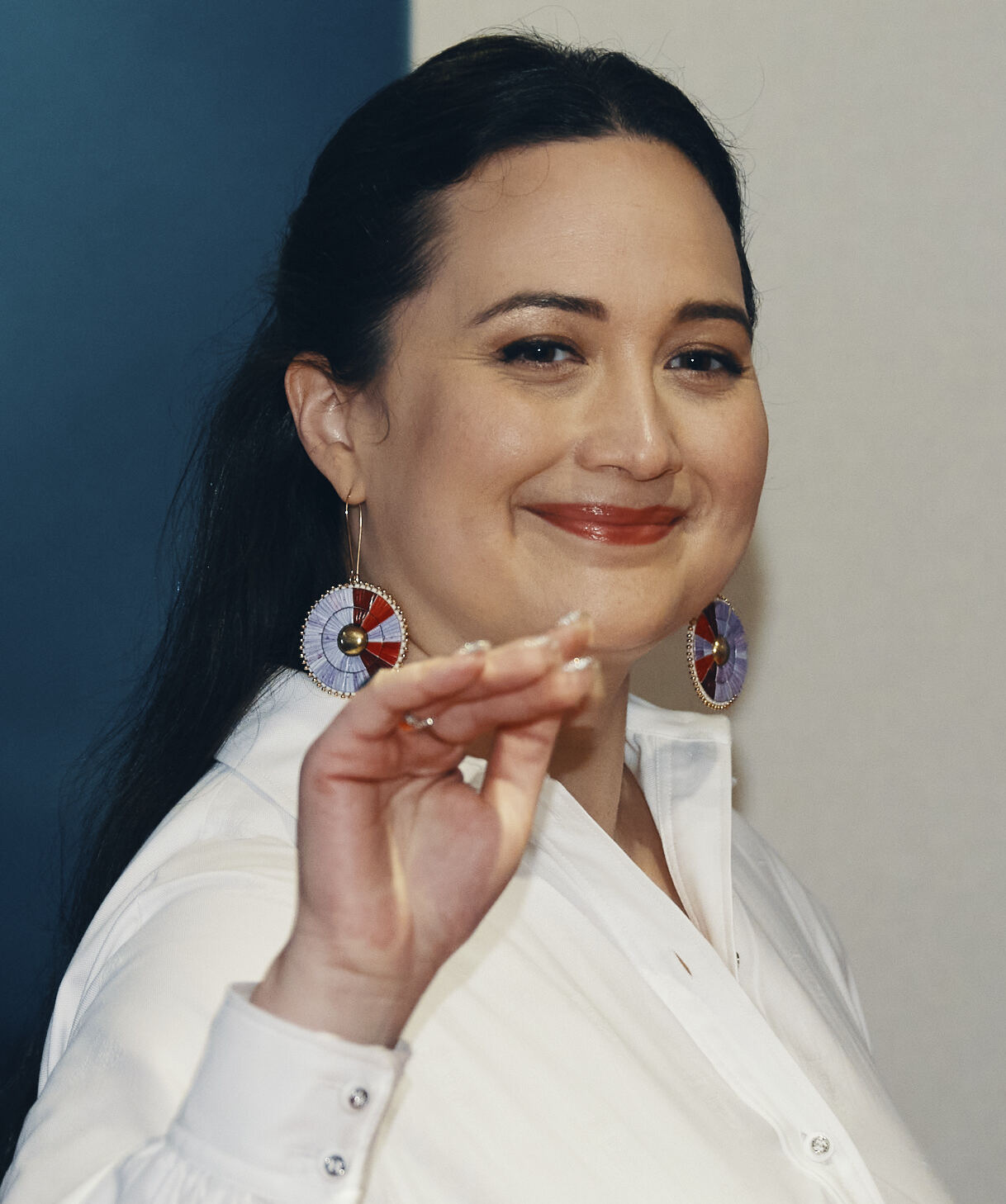
Director Martin Scorsese (top left) and lead actors: Leonardo DiCaprio, Robert De Niro, and Lily Gladstone

On March 10, 2016, Imperative Entertainment won the bidding war to make a film adaptation of David Grann's nonfiction book Killers of the Flower Moon and paid $5 million. The studio's Dan Friedkin and Bradley Thomas would produce the film. In April 2017, it was revealed that Martin Scorsese, Leonardo DiCaprio, and Robert De Niro were considering involvement in the film, adapted by Eric Roth. Both De Niro and DiCaprio had long histories of working with Scorsese, but the three had collaborated only once before, in the short film The Audition (2015).

In June 2019, it was announced that Paramount Pictures would distribute the film. Scorsese later reached out to Netflix and Apple TV+ to finance and distribute the film, as Paramount had concerns about the film's budget reaching $200 million. Paramount was still open to a deal to be involved with the film alongside an additional partner. In May 2020, Apple TV+ was announced to co-finance and co-distribute the film, with Paramount remaining as distributor.

=== Writing ===
The initial script focused on the perspective of Thomas Bruce White Sr. and the Bureau of Investigation coming into Oklahoma to investigate the murders of the Osage Nation, with DiCaprio originally cast to star as White. This version of the script would have been a more faithful adaptation of Grann's book and, at one point, was nearly two hundred pages in length. Scorsese compared the initial draft to a police procedural and said that he and Roth struggled to complete the script due to their unfamiliarity and discomfort with writing for that genre.

Scorsese and Roth worked on the script for nearly two years before DiCaprio questioned Scorsese about where the heart of the story lay. After several meetings and dinners with members of the Osage, Scorsese realized that the real story came from their perspective. During those meetings, tribe members would constantly mention the marriage between the American war veteran Ernest Burkhart and the Osage tribe member Mollie Kyle and that the couple were indeed in love. This intrigued Scorsese, who concluded the heart of the film lay in the love story between Ernest and Mollie, as well as Mollie's self-deception in staying with her husband despite his onerous dealings.

DiCaprio then suggested changing his role from Tom White to Ernest Burkhart, to which Scorsese agreed. Scorsese and Roth would then overhaul the script to switch the film's main perspective to the Osage community's, and to place the story's emphasis on Burkhart and his torn loyalties between his wife and his uncle William King Hale. Paramount felt this character change resulted in the film turning into "a moody and less commercial character study," but Lily Gladstone would later say that the Osage Nation's input had positively affected the film, stating "the work is better when you let the world inform your work". Scorsese would cite Ari Aster and his films, Midsommar (2019) and Beau Is Afraid (2023), as inspirations for the "slower...quieter" pacing of Killers of the Flower Moon. On rumors that he did uncredited rewrites, Paul Thomas Anderson said he offered his thoughts.

When writing the ending, Scorsese and Roth noted how previous adaptations had reduced the events to being "entertainment", and instead wanted their film to "take responsibility". They had conceived various versions of the ending, including the filming of a Hollywood movie similar to that of The FBI Story (1959), but changed to the filming of a radio drama adaptation as the script focused on Mollie and Ernest's relationship. Wanting to avoid chyrons, Roth wrote the final tribute to Mollie, which Scorsese himself would end up delivering in the film as he felt he could not direct another actor in doing so.

=== Casting ===
In July 2019, it was reported that De Niro had joined the cast, with filming tentatively set to commence in the summer of 2020. At the 26th Screen Actors Guild Awards on January 19, 2020, DiCaprio confirmed that he and De Niro would star in the film. DiCaprio was paid $30 million for his involvement. In February 2021, Gladstone and Jesse Plemons were added to the cast. Production wanted a Native American actress to portray Mollie Kyle. Casting director Ellen Lewis first tipped Scorsese off to Gladstone by showing him Certain Women (2016), where Gladstone's performance impressed Scorsese.

Gladstone was selected for the role after a Zoom call with Scorsese, in which they discussed Catholicism. DiCaprio also endorsed Gladstone after the two actors had their own conversation on Zoom, and soon the Osage Nation gave their own approval for Gladstone. The role of Thomas White, the lead BOI agent, was initially written for DiCaprio, but after DiCaprio pushed to instead portray Ernest Burkhart, Plemons was cast as White.

In March 2021, Tantoo Cardinal, Cara Jade Myers, JaNae Collins, and Jillian Dion were added to the cast. William Belleau, Louis Cancelmi, Jason Isbell, Sturgill Simpson, Tatanka Means, Michael Abbott Jr., Pat Healy, and Scott Shepherd joined the next month. In June, Steve Eastin, Gary Basaraba and Barry Corbin were added to the cast, while Brendan Fraser and John Lithgow would join in August.

=== Filming ===
Filming experienced several delays. In July 2017, production designer Dante Ferretti said that filming would begin in early 2018, with Scorsese directing and DiCaprio starring. Production stalled until October 2018, when it was announced that the film would be Scorsese's next effort after completing The Irishman (2019). At that point, filming was due to begin in summer 2019. In December 2019, Rodrigo Prieto, Scorsese's frequent cinematographer since The Wolf of Wall Street (2013), said that the film was expected to start principal photography in March 2020, adding that the "look and feel of the film" was still being figured out. In April 2020, it was announced that the filming of Killers of the Flower Moon had been postponed indefinitely in response to the COVID-19 pandemic. Production was expected to resume in February 2021 in Oklahoma. Jack Fisk signed on as production designer for the film, marking the first collaboration between him and Martin Scorsese.

Killers of the Flower Moon began principal photography on April 19, 2021, with filming taking place in Osage County, Oklahoma and Washington County, namely Pawhuska, Fairfax and Bartlesville. There were more than 50 production locations being used, including a combination of existing structures and built sets. In a news release before the beginning of filming, Scorsese said: "We are thrilled to finally start production on Killers of the Flower Moon in Oklahoma. To be able to tell this story on the land where these events took place is incredibly important and critical to allowing us to portray an accurate depiction of the time and people. We're grateful to Apple, the Oklahoma Film and Music Office and The Osage Nation, especially all our Osage consultants and cultural advisors, as we prepare."

Prieto shot most of the footage using film, except for some night scenes. When the film approaches the climax, Prieto uses a Technicolor process called ENR, which enhances color contrast and reduces saturation, saying that "Everybody suddenly has this harsh feel". On May 13, De Niro suffered a quadriceps muscle injury off-set and returned to New York City for medical attention. Production was completed on time, as De Niro's subsequent scenes were filmed in June 2021. When filming the radio play scene, Scorsese's family members were there, and he felt he could confidently deliver his dialogue. Principal photography wrapped on October 1, 2021. In March 2022, Osage Nation Principal Chief Geoffrey Standing Bear stated that additional footage would be shot to film a traditional community dance in mid-May in Osage County.

=== Osage Nation involvement ===
Scorsese sought to closely involve the Osage Nation in the film's production from the beginning. During pre-production, Scorsese travelled to Pawhuska, Oklahoma, to meet with Principal Chief Geoffrey Standing Bear and learn about the tribe during the "Reign of Terror", while also discussing how they could incorporate the tribe members on the film's set. A consultation was held with around 200 Osage people to gauge Osage points of view regarding the production.

Scorsese cast Osage actors in at least 40 roles, in addition to hundreds of tribe members being hired as background extras. He also employed several Osage members in both small and prominent production crew roles to ensure the accuracy of the tribe during the film's time period. Osage language teacher and translator Christopher Cote taught the actors the Osage language and gave coaching about how to use it. As Osage people in the 1920s extensively used the language, the film incorporated its use.

Brandy Lemon, an Osage Nation Congress member, served as liaison between the film production and the Osage community. Lemon was present during the film's production and consulted on several details of the film. For example, Lemon helped instruct Gladstone on how to hold her cup. Lemon credited the production for their consultative approach, saying: "They listened, that was the biggest thing. They actually listened to us."

=== Post-production ===
Industrial Light & Magic and visual effects supervisor Pablo Helman provided the visual effects for the film after previously collaborating with Scorsese on Silence (2016) and The Irishman (2019).

== Music ==
Frequent Scorsese collaborator Robbie Robertson, himself having Cayuga and Mohawk ancestry, composed the incidental score. Critics have described it as "old-timey", "bluesy", and "percussive". The film also features a soundtrack of popular music from the 1920s and Native American songs. It was Robertson's final completed film score before he died in August 2023. The film is dedicated to his memory. The film's trailer music was performed by Canadian band Reuben and the Bullhorn Singers.

== Release ==
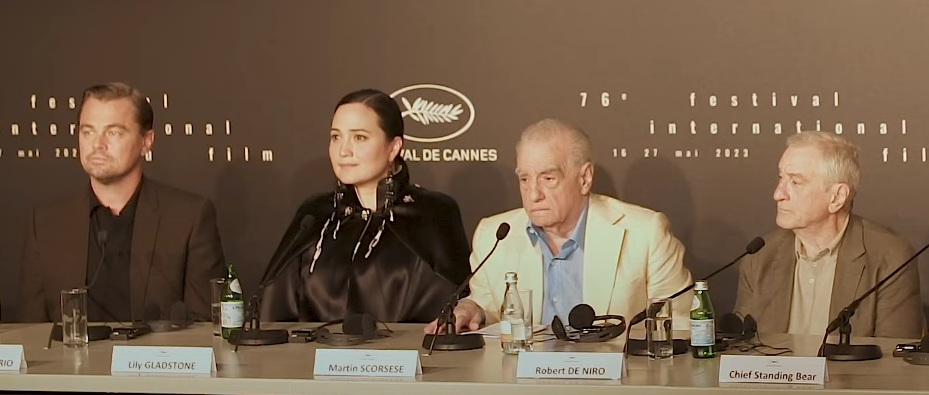
A press conference for the film at the 2023 Cannes Film Festival

Killers of the Flower Moon had its world premiere at the 76th Cannes Film Festival on May 20, 2023, where the film received a nine-minute standing ovation at the end of its screening. The film's United States premiere took place on September 27, 2023, at Alice Tully Hall at Lincoln Center in New York City, with none of the cast members in attendance due to the 2023 SAG-AFTRA strike. It was also screened as a Headline Gala at the 67th BFI London Film Festival on October 7, 2023. The film was originally set to open in select theaters on October 6, 2023, before going wide in the United States on October 20, 2023, by Apple TV+, under their Apple Original Films label, and Paramount Pictures. The limited release was later scrapped, with the film receiving a global theatrical rollout on October 20.

As reported by Variety, Italy's Rai Cinema, alongside Leone Film Group, had acquired the rights for local theatrical release over Paramount as they managed to secure the rights in the middle of the film's production progress. Right before the film's second trailer premiered in July 2023, it was announced that the film would also be released in IMAX theatres.

A few cinemas in Denmark, Germany, Italy, Portugal, Brazil, the Netherlands, and the United States inserted their own intermission into the film. The theaters were considered to violate their contract by Paramount and Apple Original Films, who took action to have it stopped. The film has been criticized for its long running time, which Scorsese and editor Thelma Schoonmaker have publicly defended. The film debuted at the #2 position at the global box office, behind Vijay's film Leo. The film was released on video on demand (VOD) platforms on December 5, 2023, and became available for streaming on Apple TV+ on January 12, 2024. In March 2025, it was reported that Apple declined a request from the Criterion Collection to release the film in physical formats. However, in December 2025, the film was announced as part of Criterion's slate of releases on 4K UHD, Blu-ray, and DVD, with an announced release date of March 24, 2026.

== Reception ==
=== Box office ===
Killers of the Flower Moon grossed $68.1 million in the United States and Canada, and $90.7 million in other territories, for a worldwide total of $158.8 million. Variety noted that under a traditional theatrical release, the film would need to gross $500–600 million worldwide to break even. In February 2024, Deadline Hollywood reported that the film fell about $20 million short of covering its marketing budget during its theatrical run, but made that up from home rentals, leaving a net loss equivalent to its $200 million production budget for Apple. However, Apple insisted the film was profitable.

In the United States and Canada, the film was projected to gross $20–25 million from 3,621 theaters in its opening weekend. The film made $9.4 million on its first day, including $2.6 million from Thursday night previews. It went on to debut to $23 million. The total was above the average Scorsese–DiCaprio collaboration ($19 million), the highest opening of Scorsese–De Niro collaborations, topping Cape Fear's $10.2 million in 1991, and the third-best of Scorsese's career. 61% of the audience was male, with "an amazing" 38% over 45 years old. The film made $9 million in its second weekend, a drop of 61%, then $7 million in its third, finishing in third place both times. Following its 10 Oscar nominations, the film expanded from 16 theaters to 941 in its 15th week of release and made $220,000, an increase of 3,811% from the previous weekend.

=== Critical response ===
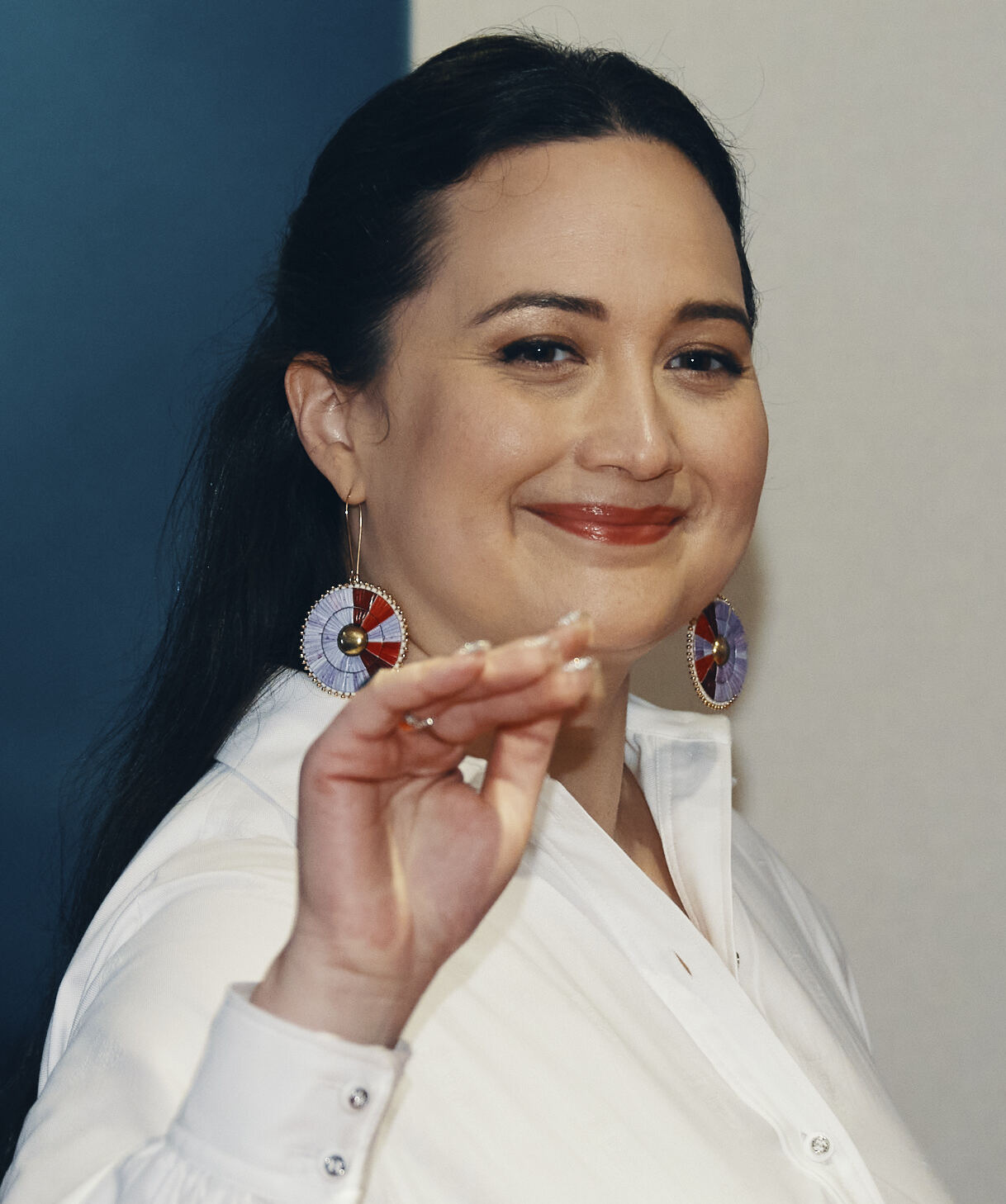
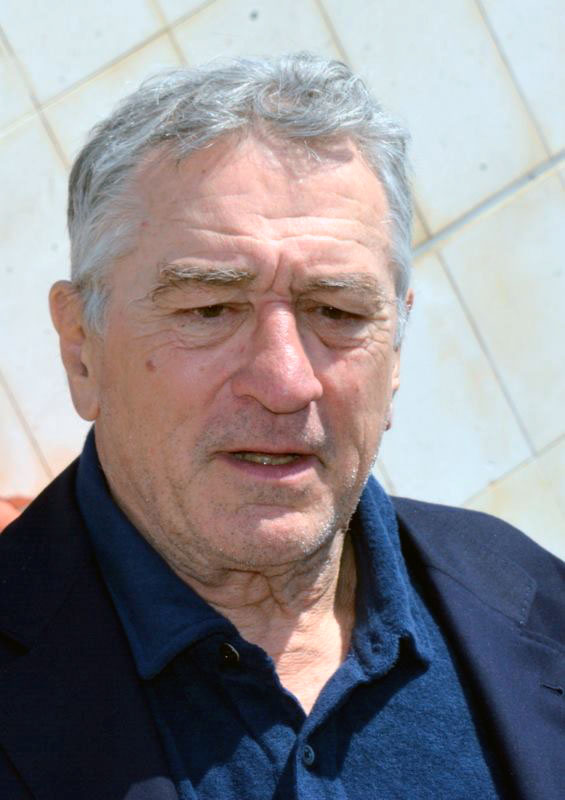
Lily Gladstone and Robert De Niro garnered critical acclaim for their performances and earned Academy Award nominations for Best Actress and Best Supporting Actor.

On the review aggregator website Rotten Tomatoes, 93% of 473 critics' reviews are positive, with an average rating of 8.5/10. The website's consensus reads: "Enormous in runtime, theme, and achievement, Killers of the Flower Moon is a sobering appraisal of America's relationship with Indigenous peoples and yet another artistic zenith for Martin Scorsese and his collaborators." Metacritic, which uses a weighted average, assigned the film a score of 89 out of 100, based on 63 critics, indicating "universal acclaim". Audiences polled by CinemaScore gave the film an average grade of "A−" on an A+ to F scale, while those polled by PostTrak gave it an 88% overall positive score, with 72% saying they would definitely recommend the film.

Critic Brian Tallerico on RogerEbert.com gave the film 4 out of 4 stars, writing: "In the end, Killers of the Flower Moon is like a puzzle—each creative piece does its part to form the complete picture. When it's put together, it's depressingly easy to see the wolves. The question now is, what do we do when we find them?"

In his review of the "meaty and demanding" film following its premiere at Cannes, Peter Debruge of Variety commended the story, characters and themes, but criticized the runtime: "In its present form, [Killers of the Flower Moon] is still a compelling true story ... It's engrossing from the get-go, the palpable tension methodically echoed by Robbie Robertson's steady-heartbeat score. But it keeps going and going until everyone we care about is dead, dying or behind bars, with nearly an hour still in store". David Rooney of The Hollywood Reporter argued that "the three-and-a-half-hour running time is fully justified in an escalating tragedy that never loosens its grip" and praised the screenplay, direction, cinematography, score, and cast performances (particularly that of Gladstone).

In The Guardian, Peter Bradshaw called the film an "epic of creeping, existential horror about the birth of the American century, a macabre tale of quasi-genocidal serial killings" and also lauded the "performance of tragic force" by Gladstone. The Los Angeles Times' Justin Chang observed that the film "is both like and unlike anything its director has ever done", writing: "Scorsese doesn't just achieve a sense of place; he also pulls off, not for the first time, a passionate and meticulous feat of cultural anthropology. He brings an entire bygone era to rich, teeming life, just before he chokes it off with an all-consuming stench of death."

The film's coda in particular drew acclaim for its acknowledgement of the historical silencing of crimes committed against Indigenous peoples, with Joel Robinson of Slate writing the scene "turns the camera both inward and onto the audience simultaneously", and The New Yorker's Richard Brody noting: "Scorsese's control of form and tone, and the bold yet subtle way that he marshals incident, signal that he is intent not merely on narrating history but on troubling the conscience of his (doubtless largely white) audience".

Much praise was given to Gladstone's performance, with Anthony Lane of The New Yorker describing her as "unmistakably the movie's most compelling presence", and Chang calling her "an actor who can set off more emotional reverberations with a barely cracked smile than some performers manage in an entire monologue". Brody observed: "[Mollie] is not only the character on whose actions the drama pivots but also the one whose subjectivity, presented sparingly but suggested powerfully, gives the story a sense of inner life."

Filmmaker Alfonso Cuarón praised the film, stating: "Scorsese has chosen a distant and reflective stance, favoring atmosphere over narrative, denying us the easy satisfaction of moral superiority to the men on screen who managed to justify their hideous betrayals of their loved ones and still pretend to have a soul, and confronting audiences with the sin by omission that must rightfully haunt the American soul." Filmmakers Phạm Thiên Ân, Joe Dante, Robert Eggers, and Reinaldo Marcus Green, as well as actor Bill Hader, also cited it as among their favorite films of 2023.

The February 2024 issue of New York Magazine lists Killers of the Flower Moon as among "The Best Movies That Lost Best Picture at the Oscars." IndieWire included it on its list of "The Best Modern Western Movies" in November 2024 and ranked it at number 29 on its list of "The 100 Best Movies of the 2020s (So Far)" in June 2025. In July 2025, the film ranked number 93 on the "Readers' Choice" edition of The New York Times' list of "The 100 Best Movies of the 21st Century." Killers of the Flower Moon topped a Sight and Sound poll of the best films of 2023, as determined by 106 critics.

Some critics lamented the film's decision to focus its narrative on the characters of Ernest and Hale, opining that the character of Mollie felt underdeveloped. Chang noted: "The movie seems curiously reluctant to penetrate the psychology of its Osage characters — a reluctance that feels like timidity, respect or maybe a mix of both." Angelica Jade Bastién of Vulture wrote: "Trapped by the gleam of reverence, [Scorsese] ends up returning to the same racial stereotypes he sought to avoid: The Osage people are noble and connected to the land, but their personalities, their desires, their joys, and, most crucially, their anger remain in the shadowed hallways of a history Scorsese is too timid to approach."

=== Accolades ===
Killers of the Flower Moon received 10 nominations at the 96th Academy Awards: Best Picture, Best Director, Best Actress, Best Supporting Actor, Best Cinematography, Best Costume Design, Best Film Editing, Best Original Score, Best Original Song, and Best Production Design, but did not win any awards, making it the third time Scorsese directed a movie that received 10 nominations but no wins after Gangs of New York and The Irishman. It was longlisted, along with Barbie and Oppenheimer, in 15 categories at the 77th British Academy Film Awards, equaling the BAFTA longlist record for most nominations set by Edward Berger's German anti-war film All Quiet on the Western Front (2022).

For her portrayal of Mollie Burkhart, Gladstone became the first Indigenous American actress to be nominated for an Academy Award. At age 81, Scorsese earned his tenth nomination for Best Director, (Note: This tenth nomination only includes Scorsese's accolades within the Best Director category. He has additional nominations in writing and producing, and now has the second most, surpassing Steven Spielberg, who has nine for directing (and two wins); William Wyler maintains the record with twelve nominations (and three wins).) garnering more Oscar nominations for that category (including one prior win) than anyone alive. Scorsese also became the oldest Best Director nominee, eclipsing John Huston, (Note: John Huston was 79 when he received his final Best Director nomination for Prizzi's Honor (1985).) who was 79. Schoonmaker earned her ninth nomination for Best Editing, surpassing the record for most nominations in this category. Robbie Robertson earned his first Academy Award nomination (for Best Original Score), becoming the 64th individual to earn a posthumous nomination for a competitive category.

Gladstone's loss to Emma Stone for Best Actress (for Poor Things) at the 96th Academy Awards stirred debate over what some deemed a "snub". Some argued that awarding Stone was a missed opportunity for greater inclusivity to Native Americans, with others arguing that since Stone had already won Best Actress for her performance in La La Land (2016), Gladstone was more deserving of the award. Stone herself was surprised at her win, stating: "I think I blacked out. I was very shocked."

In its summary of 2024 Oscar winners and losers, Billboard magazine classified the movie's lack of Academy Awards, despite 10 nominations, as a snub, noting: "OK, that happens at awards shows. But this was director Martin Scorsese's third film to go 0-10 on Oscar night, following Gangs of New York (2002) and The Irishman (2019). Scorsese is universally acknowledged as one of the greatest directors of our time. For it to happen three times to the same director – a legend, no less – is hard to explain."

=== Indigenous response ===
Lindsey Bark of the Cherokee Phoenix wrote that there was "hope that this film opens up more discussion among non-Native people about the real tragedies that have occurred to Native people throughout history". However, Christopher Kuo of The New York Times wrote that, despite broad agreement in Indigenous circles that the film accurately portrays the culture and language of the Osage people, there was a mixed overall reaction to the film among indigenous people.

At the film's Los Angeles premiere, Christopher Cote, an Osage who was a language consultant for the film, said that he "really wanted this to be from the perspective of Mollie and what her family experienced". Slate's Joel Robinson, an Osage, expressed similar views, but still praised the film, concurring with former chief of the Osage Nation Jim Gray that he had "never seen a film immerse itself in a culture like this one did with ours". He added that he hoped that the success of the film would mean more opportunities for Indigenous filmmakers to tell stories from their own point of view.

Maureen Lee Lenker noted in Entertainment Weekly that first Nations actress Devery Jacobs (Elora Danan Postoak on Reservation Dogs) shared her reaction to the film: "Being Native, watching this movie was f---ing hellfire ... Our pride, languages, cultures, joy & love are way more interesting & humanizing than showing the horrors white men inflicted on us." Jacobs did believe that Gladstone "carried Mollie [with] tremendous grace" and that no performances were weak, but still argued that "each of the Osage characters felt painfully underwritten, while the white men were given way more courtesy and depth". Lindsey Bark quoted Cherokee Nation citizen Tim Landes as saying: "This movie is another example of why it's important our tribe continues to invest in our filmmakers, so we can share accurate stories that show our side. We can't trust other filmmakers to get it right, even if they are a legend like Martin Scorsese."

Some were more positive. Indigenous commentator Kate Nelson wrote: "When it comes to Native representation, is Killers of the Flower Moon perfect? No. Is it progress? Yes. The film meaningfully moves the entertainment industry forward, making a strong statement that it's no longer acceptable to extract valuable assets from Indigenous communities – whether that be our stories or our natural resources – without our consent and input." Gianna Sieke, an Osage princess from 2021 to 2023 who was present for the film's production, told Today: "It does tell our dark history but it's also including things that no one really knows, and it hasn't been expressed to Osage people and anyone because it's a dark history. People don't really talk about it that much. And because of that, (the movie) has made a really big impact. Families are learning to cope and understand."

On November 9, 2023, the day that the SAG-AFTRA strike ended, Gladstone posted on social media encouraging Native people to "see it when and only if you feel ready, and see it with people you feel safe with. You'll likely have a lot of generational grief to process".

=== Legislative responses ===
Lieutenant Governor of Oklahoma Matt Pinnell named the film as a reason to increase subsidies for the film industry in Oklahoma. The Filmed in Oklahoma Act of 2021 allocated $30 million to film subsidies. Bills to increase the total available subsidies to $80 million in 2023 failed in the Oklahoma Senate after passing the Oklahoma House of Representatives.

== See also ==
- List of 2020s films based on actual events
