= 41st Artios Awards =

American film and television awards

- Date: February 26, 2026
- Site: The Beverly Hilton, Los Angeles; The Edison Ballroom, New York City; One Moorgate Place, London
- Country: United States
- Presented by: Casting Society
- Hosted by: Harvey Guillén (Los Angeles); Jeff Hiller (New York City); Jessica Gunning (London)
- Website: www.castingsociety.com/awards/artios

The 41st Artios Awards, presented on February 26, 2026, by the Casting Society, honored the best in originality, creativity and contribution of casting professionals to the overall quality of a film, television series, short form projects, theatre production and commercials. The ceremony was held simultaneously at The Beverly Hilton in Los Angeles, the Edison Ballroom in New York, and the One Moorgate Place in London. Harvey Guillén, Jeff Hiller, and Jessica Gunning will host the respective galas.

The nominations for the television, short-form projects, and theatre categories were announced on October 8, 2025. The nominations for the film categories and London theatre were announced in January 8, 2026. A new category, Casting for London Theatre, is introduced at this year's ceremony.

== Winners and nominees ==
Winners and nominees are listed in alphabetical order. Winners are listed first and emphasized in bold.

=== Film ===
**Feature Big Budget – Comedy**: **Jay Kelly – Douglas Aibel and Nina Gold; Matthew Glasner (Associate Casting Director); Francesco Vedovati and Barbara Giordani (Location Casting Directors)**; Materialists – Douglas Aibel; Matthew Glasner (Associate Casting Director); The Naked Gun – Carmen Cuba; Judith Sunga (Associate Casting Director); Tara Feldstein Bennett and Chase Paris (Location Casting Directors); The Phoenician Scheme – Douglas Aibel (US Casting); Jina Jay (UK Casting); Alexandra Montag (German Casting); Matthew Glasner (Associate Casting Director); Wake Up Dead Man – Mary Vernieu and Bret Howe; Martin Ware (Location Casting Director); Olivia Brittain (Location Associate Casting Director); Wicked: For Good – Bernard Telsey and Tiffany Little Canfield; Ryan Bernard Tymensky (Associate Casting Director); Tamsyn Manson (Location Casting Director)	**Feature Big Budget – Drama**: **Sinners – Francine Maisler; Molly Rose and Amber Wakefield (Associate Casting Directors); Meagan Lewis (Location Casting Director)**; Bugonia – Jennifer Venditti; Alan Scott Neal (Associate Casting Director); F1 – Lucy Bevan and Emily Brockmann; Katie Brydon (Associate Casting Director); Tara Feldstein Bennett, Chase Paris, and Tara Mazzucca (Location Casting Directors); Frankenstein – Robin D. Cook; Jonathan Oliveira (Associate Casting Director); Hamnet – Nina Gold; Lucy Amos (Associate Casting Director); Marty Supreme – Jennifer Venditti; Alan Scott Neal ( Associate Casting Director); Ko Iwagami (Location Casting Director)
**Feature Studio or Independent – Comedy**: **Rental Family – Kei Kawamura**; Eternity – Tiffany Mak, Chelsea Ellis Bloch, and Marisol Roncali; Friendship – Melissa Delizia; Oh, Hi! – Kate Geller; Ross Shenker (Associate Casting Director); The Wedding Banquet – Jenny Jue; Candice Elzinga (Location Casting Director); Twinless – Jessica Munks; Simon Max Hill (Location Casting Director)	**Feature Studio or Independent – Drama**: **Sentimental Value – Avy Kaufman**; Blue Moon – Olivia Scott-Webb; Simon Higgins (Associate Casting Director); Eleanor the Great – Ellen Lewis and Kate Sprance; Leah Shapiro (Associate Casting Director); Nuremberg – John Papsidera and Anna Kennedy; Emily Bohbrink (Associate Casting Director); Francesco Vedovati (Location Casting Director); Pillion – Kahleen Crawford; Train Dreams – Avy Kaufman; Nike Imoru (Location Casting Director)
**Feature Low Budget – Comedy or Drama**: **Sorry, Baby – Jessica Kelly; Lisa Lobel and Angela Peri (Location Casting Directors); Melissa Morris (Location Associate Casting Director)**; All That We Love – Charlene Lee; Danny Gordon (Associate Casting Director); Bob Trevino Likes It – Kate Geller; Ross Shenker (Associate Casting Director); Griffin in Summer – Betsy Ware Fippinger; Erica Arvold (Location Casting Director); Plainclothes – Bernard Telsey, Adam Caldwell, and Amelia Rasche Mccarthy; We Strangers – Erica A. Hart; Lauren Port (Location Casting Director)	**International Film**: **The Fisherman – Mawuko Kuadzi**; Kokuho – Masunobu Motokawa; Sound of Falling – Karimah El-Giamal
**Feature Animation**: **Zootopia 2 – Grace C. Kim**; Elio – Natalie Lyon, Kevin Reher, and Kate Hansen-Birnbaum; Lexi Diamond (Associate Casting Director); The Bad Guys 2 – Christi Soper Hilt; Lara Boushehri (Associate Casting Director)

=== Television ===
**Television Series – Comedy**: **Hacks (Season 4) – Linda Lowy**; Abbott Elementary (Season 4) – Wendy O'Brien and Chris Gehrt; The Bear (Season 3) – Jeanie Bacharach; Mickie Paskal and Jennifer Rudnicke (Location Casting Director); Kaitlin Shaw (Location Associate Casting Director); Only Murders in the Building (Season 4) – Bernard Telsey, Tiffany Little Canfield, and Destiny Lilly; Danielle King (Associate Casting Director); Shrinking (Season 2) – Brett Benner and Debby Romano; Becca Burgess (Associate Casting Director); Survival of the Thickest (Season 2) – Erica A. Hart; Briana Dunlay (Associate Casting Director)	**Television Series – Drama**: **Severance (Season 2) – Rachel Tenner; Rick Messina (Associate Casting Director); Bess Fifer (Location Casting Director)**; Bad Sisters (Season 2) – Nina Gold and Lucy Amos; Slow Horses (Season 4) – Nina Gold and Melissa Gethin Clarke; The Diplomat (Season 2) – Julie Schubert, Lucinda Syson, and Natasha Vincent; The Handmaid's Tale (Season 6) – Sharon Bialy, Sherry Thomas, and Russell Scott; Stacia Kimler (Associate Casting Director); Robin D. Cook (Location Casting Director); Jonathan Oliveira (Location Associate Casting Director); The Last of Us (Season 2) – Mary Vernieu, Lindsay Graham Ahanonu, and Sydney Shircliff; Corinne Clark and Jennifer Page (Location Casting Directors); Megan Bayliss (Location Associate Casting Director)
**Television Pilot and First Season – Comedy**: **The Studio – Melissa Kostenbauder and Francine Maisler; Jesse Haddock (Associate Casting Director)**; Deli Boys – Seth Yanklewitz; Marisa Ross and Christal Karge (Location Casting Directors); Jenn Noyes (Location Associate Casting Director); English Teacher – Gayle Keller and John Papsidera; Amelia Rasche McCarthy (Associate Casting Director); Chase Paris and Tara Feldstein Bennett (Location Casting Directors); Étoile – Cindy Tolan and Anne Davison; Nicholas Petrovich (Associate Casting Director); Juliette Ménager (Location Casting Director); Nobody Wants This – Brett Greenstein and Collin Daniel; Alexa Pereira (Associate Casting Director); Overcompensating – Jessica Kelly; Lisa Parasyn (Location Casting Director)	**Television Pilot and First Season – Drama**: **The Pitt – Cathy Sandrich Gelfond; Seth Caskey (Associate Casting Director)**; Dept. Q – Olivia Scott-Webb; Matlock – Michelle Wade Byrd and Mary Vernieu; Samantha Rood (Associate Casting Director); Robin D. Cook (Location Casting Director); Jonathan Oliveira (Location Associate Casting Director); Paradise – Tiffany Little Canfield and Josh Einsohn; Brian Sutow (Associate Casting Director); The Day of the Jackal – Nina Gold and Martin Ware; The Girls on the Bus – Junie Lowry-Johnson, Libby Goldstein, Erica A. Hart; Josh Ropiequet, Briana Dunlay (Associate Casting Directors); Your Friends & Neighbors – Cindy Tolan and Suzanne Ryan; Nicholas Petrovich (Associate Casting Director)
**Limited Series**: **Adolescence – Shaheen Baig**; Disclaimer – Lucy Bevan, Emily Brockmann, and Victor Jenkins; Katie Brydon (Associate Casting Director); Dying for Sex – Jeanie Bacharach; Susan Esrock (Associate Casting Director); Jessica Daniels (Location Casting Director); Monsters: The Lyle and Erik Menendez Story – Tiffany Little Canfield, Josh Einsohn, and Bernard Telsey; Rose Bochner (Associate Casting Director); The Penguin – Cindy Tolan and Suzanne Ryan; Nicholas Petrovich (Associate Casting Director); The Perfect Couple – Robert J. Ulrich, Jina Jay, Eric Dawson, and Carol Kritzer; Angela Peri and Lisa Lobel (Location Casting Directors)	**Film, First Released for Television or Streaming**: **Bridget Jones: Mad About the Boy – Lucy Bevan and Olivia Grant; Lucy Downes (Associate Casting Director)**; Carry-On – Chelsea Ellis Bloch and Marisol Roncali; Mountainhead – Francine Maisler; Molly Rose and Amber Wakefield (Associate Casting Directors); Jeff Johnson (Location Casting Director); Nonnas – Mary Vernieu, Lindsay Graham Ahanonu, and Findley Davidson; Mark Droter (Associate Casting Director); Out of My Mind – Kerry Barden and Paul Schnee; Roya Semnanian and Rachel Goldman (Associate Casting Directors); John Buchan and Jason Knight (Location Casting Directors); Rebel Ridge – Francine Maisler and Molly Rose, Meagan Lewis (Location Casting Director); You're Cordially Invited – Nicole Abellera Hallman; Erica Johnson (Associate Casting Director); Meagan Lewis and Rebecca Carfagna (Location Casting Directors)
**Animated Program for Television**: **Big Mouth (Season 8) – Julie Ashton**; Alma's Way (Season 2) – Elaine Del Valle; Bob's Burgers (Season 15) – Julie Ashton; Everybody Still Hates Chris (Season 1) – Julie Ashton; Family Guy (Season 23) – Christine Terry and Jackie Sollitto; Win or Lose (Season 1) – Natalie Lyon, Kevin Reher, and Kate Hansen-Birnbaum; Wonder Pets: In the City (Season 1) – Danielle Pretsfelder Demchick; Elizabeth Hay (Associate Casting Director); Your Friendly Neighborhood Spider-Man (Season 1) – Sara Jane Sherman	**Live Action Children & Family Series**: **XO, Kitty (Season 2) – Lyndsey Baldasare and David H. Rapaport; Claire Yenson (Associate Casting Director); Su Kim (Location Casting Director)**; Me (Season 1) – Josh Einsohn; Ally Bader (Associate Casting Director); Erica Bream (Location Casting Director); Tab Time (Season 3) – Nickole Doro; Devon Brady (Associate Casting Director); The Thundermans: Undercover (Season 1) – Nickole Doro and Shayna Sherwood; Devon Brady (Associate Casting Director); Colleen Bolton (Location Casting Director); Wizards Beyond Waverly Place (Season 1) – Alexis Frank Koczara and Christine Smith Shevchenko; Gianna Butler (Associate Casting Director)
**Reality Series – Competition**: **RuPaul's Drag Race (Season 17) – Goloka Bolte, Michelle Redwine, and Adam Cook**; Love Island (Season 6) – Jodi Thomas and Beyhan Oguz; The Challenge (Season 40) – Damon Furberg and Lisi Alpert; The Circle (Season 7) – Erin Tomasello; Sena Rich and Joy Herrera (Casting Producers); The Golden Bachelorette (Season 1) – Jacqueline Pitman; Top Chef (Season 22) – Ron Mare; Heather Allyn, Sena Rich, and Joy Barrett (Casting Producers)	**Reality Series – Structured and Unstructured**: **Queer Eye (Season 9) – Pamela Vallarelli, Jessica Jorgensen, and Natalie Pino**; Shark Tank (Season 16) – Mindy Zemrak; Ashley Holt (Casting Producer); Summer House (Season 9) – Diona Vaughan Mankowitz; Unsolved Mysteries (Season 4) – Paul Sinacore; Vanderpump Villa (Season 2) – Damon Furberg; Melissa Kellner (Casting Producer)
**International Television Series**: **Other People's Money (Season 1) – Alexandra Montag**; Miss Fallaci (Season 1) – Maurilio Mangano and Cassandra Han; Rhythm + Flow France (Season 3) – Jennifer Teixido and Mélanie Gomes

=== Short Form Projects ===
**Short Film**: **Ado – Ally Beans**; Before the Winter – Tanya Giang; Corpse Fishing – Matthew Glasner; Exception – Hamzah Saman and Kara Sullivan; Leading Man – Tineka Becker; Teen Mary – Marin Hope; The Cockroach – Sunday Boling Kennedy	**Short Form Series**: **Die Hart (Season 3) – Chrissy Fiorilli-Ellington; Jane Flowers (Associate Casting Director); Tara Feldstein Bennett (Location Casting Director)**; Bliss Talent – Rachel Goldman; Love, Death & Robots (Season 4) – Ivy Isenberg and Natasha Vincent; Tanya Giang (Associate Casting Director); The Warehouse Phase – Helen Geier and Kendra Shay Clark; Tales of Terror – Nickole Doro; Very Important People (Season 2) – Jazzy Collins

=== Theatre ===
**Broadway – Comedy or Drama**: **English – Stephen Kopel; Sujotta Pace (Associate Casting Director)**; Glengarry Glen Ross – Will Cantler and Destiny Lilly; Good Night, and Good Luck – David Caparelliotis; Othello – Duncan Stewart; Purpose – JC Clementz, Paul Davis, and Erica Jensen; Yellow Face – Carrie Gardner and Jillian Cimini; Sujotta Pace (Associate Casting Director)	**Broadway – Musical**: **Buena Vista Social Club – Bernard Telsey, Kristian Charbonier**; **Maybe Happy Ending – Craig Burns; Jimmy Larkin (Associate Casting Director)**; Boop! The Musical – Tara Rubin and Kevin Metzger-Timson; Olivia Paige West (Associate Casting Director); Death Becomes Her – Tara Rubin and Kevin Metzger-Timson; Frankie Ramirez (Associate Casting Director); Real Women Have Curves – Victor Vazquez and Duncan Stewart; Sunset Boulevard – Jim Carnahan, Jason Thinger, and Stuart Burt
**New York Theatre – Comedy or Drama**: **Shit. Meet. Fan. – Bernard Telsey, Will Cantler, and Destiny Lilly**; Becoming Eve – Claire Yenson; Eurydice – David Caparelliotis; Ghosts – Daniel Swee; Grangeville – David Caparelliotis; The Antiquities – Alaine Alldaffer and Lauren Port	**New York Theatre – Musical**: **The Jonathan Project – Rachel Hoffman; Charlie Hano (Associate Casting Director)**; The Big Gay Jamboree – Stephen Kopel; Neal Buckley (Associate Casting Director); Drag: The Musical – Ryan Bernard Tymensky; Empire Records – Karyn Casl and Destiny Lilly; Jersey Boys – Claire Burke and Merri Sugarman; Spencer Gualdoni (Associate Casting Director); We Live in Cairo – Claire Yenson
**Los Angeles Theatre**: **Stephen Sondheim's Old Friends – Tara Rubin, Xavier Rubiano, and Peter Van Dam; Louis DiPaolo (Associate Casting Director)**; A Doll's House, Part 2 – Ryan Bernard Tymensky; Dog Sees God: Confessions of a Teenage Blockhead – Zachary Spiegel; Green Day's American Idiot – Beth Lipari; La Cage aux Folles – Ryan Bernard Tymensky; Noises Off – JC Clementz and Phyllis Schuringa	**Regional Theatre**: **Midnight in the Garden of Good and Evil – Lauren Port and Patrick Goodwin**; A Little Night Music – Mark Brandon; A Raisin in the Sun – Becca McCracken; Appropriate – David Caparelliotis; Berlin – Becca McCracken; Betrayal – Lauren Port; East Texas Hot Links – Becca McCracken; English – Stephanie Klapper; Fat Ham – Lauren Port
**Special Theatrical Performance**: **The 25th Annual Putnam County Spelling Bee – Geoff Josselson**; Dreamgirls – Destiny Lilly and Rashad Naylor; Les Misérables – Lindsay Levine; Charlie Hano (Associate Casting Director); Nine – Geoff Josselson; Titanic – Craig Burns and Rachel Hoffman; Urinetown – Kevin Metzger-Timson; Louis DiPaolo (Associate Casting Director)	**Theatre Tours**: **Parade – Craig Burns**; & Juliet – Stephen Kopel, Carrie Gardner, and Jillian Cimini; Neal Buckley and Sujotta Pace (Associate Casting Directors); Jaja's African Hair Braiding – Kelly Gillespie, David Caparelliotis, and Erica A. Hart; Kimberly Akimbo – Craig Burns; Jimmy Larkin (Associate Casting Director); Shucked – Stephen Kopel; Neal Buckley (Associate Casting Director); The Wiz – Olivia Paige West and Xavier Rubiano
**London Theatre**: **The Importance of Being Earnest – Alastair Coomer**; My Master Builder – Sophie Holland; Oedipus – Jim Carnahan; Liz Fraser (Associate Casting Director); The Devil Wears Prada – Jill Green; Olivia Laydon (Associate Casting Director); The Little Foxes - Jessica Ronane; Titanique – James Pearson and Rosie Pearson

=== Commercials ===
**Commercial**
- **Ad Council: "Listening is a Form of Love" – Angela Mickey; Aika Greenidge (Associate Casting Director)**
  - NFL: "NFL Football Country 2024" – Caitlin D. Jones
  - On: "On, Dream Together, Global Campaign" – Victor Vazquez, Allison Twardziak
  - Roborock: Eva: "Celebrating a Decade of Pioneering Innovation" – Katie Griffin and Ali Coffey
  - Road Safety Authority: "Drug Driving Campaign - Consequences" – Katie Griffin and Ali Coffey
  - The Nice Guys – Hunter McHugh
  - Walmart: "Making of Deals of Desire" – Chrissy Fiorilli-Ellington; Ally Bader and Brent Hagata (Associate Casting Directors)
