= Oak Hill Gazette =

Oak Hill Gazette is a former weekly community newspaper serving the Oak Hill area of southwest Austin, Texas since 1995. The Gazette is published every Wednesday and has a circulation that varies from 5,000 to 6,500. The newspaper's scope is hyper-local, covering only southwest Austin area news. The Gazette appears to be defunct, as the website has not been updated since 2017, and their Facebook page has not been updated since 2013.

The Oak Hill Association of Neighborhoods claims the Gazette is the best place to find local school news.

The paper does not run political endorsements or editorials but does publish user-generated Letters to the Editor and opinion pieces.

In 2007, the Oak Hill Gazette tied with The Onion in the Austin Chronicle newspaper's Best of Austin readers' poll as "Best Local Non-Chronicle Publication." In 2008, the Oak Hill Gazette won the poll outright.

== The publishers ==
Owners and publishers, Will Atkins and Penelope Levers (husband and wife), are native Austinites who have been publishing weekly community newspapers since 1985.

Atkins and Levers founded The Mountain Villager, a weekly tabloid newspaper in Jericho, Vermont, which they published from 1985 - 1991. After selling that paper, they started another weekly, The Cambridge Chronicle in Cambridge, Vermont, which they published from 1991 - 1994 and then the Morrisville Messenger, which they published from 1993 - 1994. In 1995 they moved back to Austin, Texas and started the Oak Hill Gazette.
