= Samuel French (actor) =

American film and television actor

- French in 2025
- Born: Samuel Don French; January 26, 1980; Waco, Texas, U.S.
- Died: May 9, 2025 (aged 45); Waco, Texas, U.S.
- Occupations: Film and television actor

Samuel Don French (January 26, 1980 – May 9, 2025) was an American film and television actor. He was best known for playing CJ Robinson, an undercover FBI agent in the 2023 film Killers of the Flower Moon.

== Life and career ==
French was born in Waco, Texas, the son of Gary Don French and Ruby Darlene Spence. At the age of three, he and his family moved to Clifton, Texas. He attended Clifton High School, graduating in 1998. He began his screen career in 2015, appearing in the History Channel miniseries Texas Rising. In 2020, he guest-starred in an episode of the AMC post-apocalyptic horror television series Fear the Walking Dead.

Later in his career, in 2023, French starred as the title character in the film Joe Haladin: The Case of the Missing Sister. In the same year, he played CJ Robinson, an undercover FBI agent in the film Killers of the Flower Moon. He appeared in films such as The Pro Bono Watchman and Blood Dried Hands. His final role included playing Detective Bernard Crooke in Paul Sinacore's upcoming film Towpath.

== Death ==
French died of cancer on May 9, 2026, in a hospital in Waco, Texas, at the age of 45.
