= Anti-Eastern =

The term Anti-Eastern may refer to:

- Anti-Middle Eastern sentiment, negative sentiments and animosities towards people from the Middle East
- Anti-Eastern Orthodox sentiment, negative sentiments and animosities towards Eastern Orthodox Christianity
- opposition to any other notion related to East (mainly in cultural, religious, ethnic or some other terms)

== See also ==
- Anti-Western (disambiguation)
