= Thomas Bruce White Sr. =

American law officer and prison warden (1881–1971)

Tom White
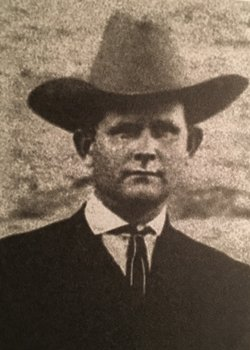
- Born: Thomas Bruce White; March 6, 1881; Oak Hill, Texas, U.S.
- Died: December 21, 1971 (aged 90); El Paso, Texas, U.S.
- Education: Southwestern University
- Height: 193 cm (6 ft 4 in)
- Spouse: Bessie Patterson (m. 1909)
- Children: 2

Thomas Bruce White Sr. (March 6, 1881 – December 21, 1971) was an American law officer and prison warden. He is known for solving the complex and notorious Osage murder case and later being warden of Leavenworth Prison in Kansas.

== Biography ==
White was born on March 6, 1881, in Oak Hill, Texas, the son of the Travis County sheriff Robert Emmet White and Margaret White. His mother died when Thomas was six. He attended Southwestern University in Georgetown, Texas.

Leaving school early, White traveled the country holding various jobs in Oklahoma and California. He enlisted in the Texas Rangers from 1905 to 1909 with three of his four siblings. He resigned from the Rangers and worked as a special agent for the Santa Fe Railway and the Southern Pacific Railroad until 1917. He then worked as a Bureau of Investigation (BOI) agent until 1926. During that time, he was in charge of the Houston office and was head of the Osage murder investigation; his use of undercover agents to gather information without tipping off the corrupt lawmen and officials linked to the murders brought about several major convictions.

After the Osage investigation, White left the BOI (which later became the Federal Bureau of Investigation in 1935) and took charge as Warden of the Leavenworth Prison until 1931, when he was seriously injured after being held hostage by armed prisoners and shot in a prison escape attempt. Afterwards, the Federal Bureau of Prisons decided that White should be given a less demanding assignment and transferred him to La Tuna Federal Correctional Institution (1932–1951), near El Paso, Texas. After his retirement from the penitentiary system, Tom served on a three-man board overseeing pardons and parole hearings for incarcerated persons in Texas until 1957.

He remained in retirement until his death on December 21, 1971.

== In popular media ==
A composite version of Thomas White played by James Stewart named John Michael "Chip" Hardesty is the main character of the 1959 film The FBI Story, which features a fictionalized version of the Osage murders and White's investigation.

In the 2023 film Killers of the Flower Moon, White is portrayed by actor Jesse Plemons.
