= Oak Hill, Austin, Texas =

Oak Hill
- Unincorporated community
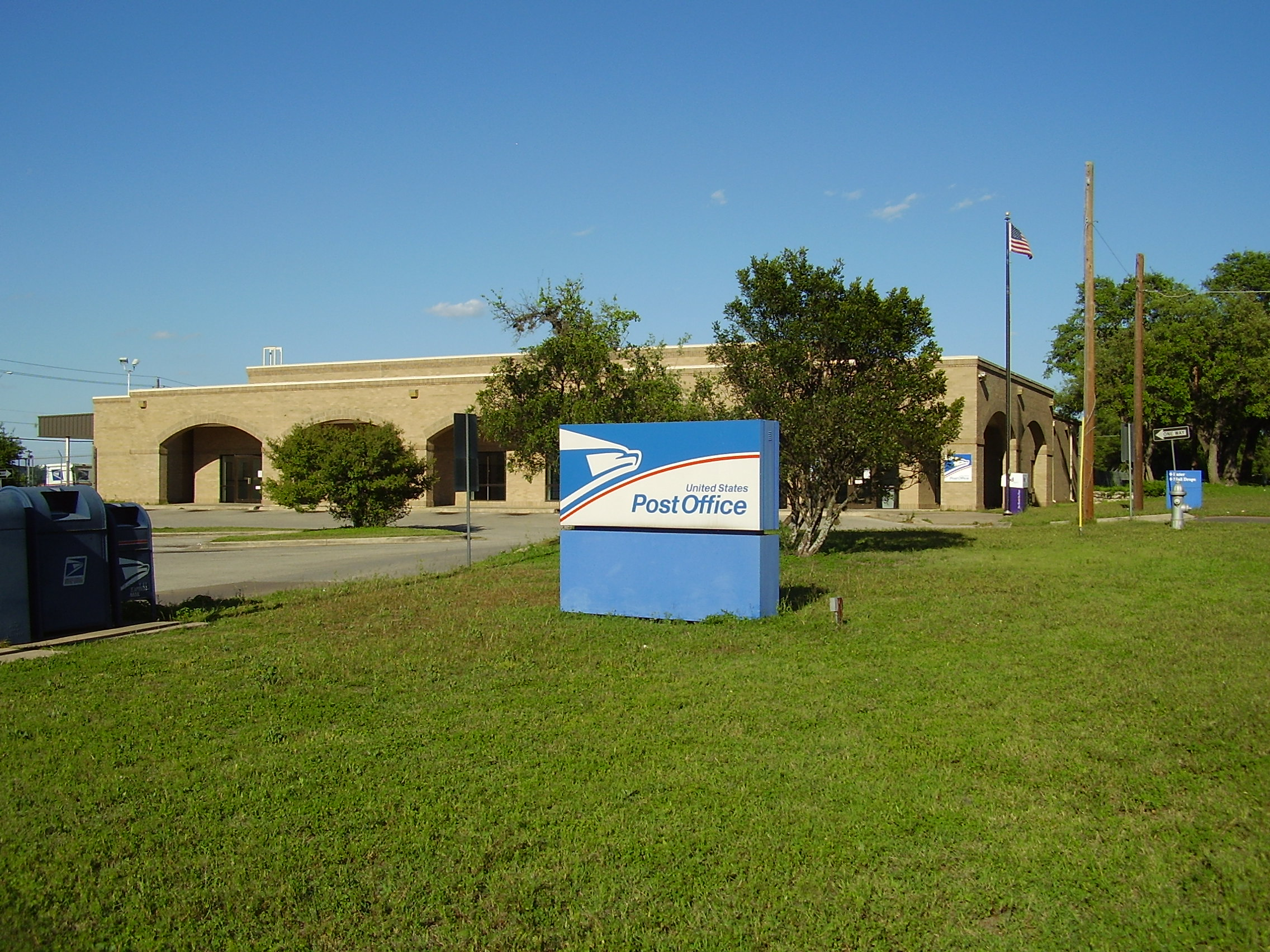
- A post office in Oak Hill
- Neighborhood Boundaries
- Location within the state of Texas
- Coordinates: 30°14′7″N 97°51′35″W
- Country: United States
- State: Texas
- County: Travis
- Time zone: UTC-6 (Central (CST))
  - Summer (DST): UTC-5 (CDT)
- ZIP codes: 78735; 78736; 78737; 78738; 78748; 78749
- Area codes: 512, 737

Oak Hill is an unincorporated community and collection of neighborhoods located in southwestern Austin, Texas, United States.

== History ==
The area now known as Oak Hill was initially known as Live Oak Springs in the 19th century. The land was awarded to William Cannon by the Mexican government in 1835. His land stretched from Williamson Creek to Slaughter Creek. Settlers began coming into the area shortly after the founding of the city of Austin and Travis County.

In 1846, William D. Glascock brought his family and slaves from Mississippi, settling just north of Williamson Creek. Two years later, Glascock sold some of his land to Norwegian immigrant John Ernest Mowinkle, and the community, as such, was born.

In 1865, unsuccessful attempts were made to change the community's name to Shiloh, after the Civil War battle. In 1869, however, the community was given the name Oatmanville. Following the Civil War, the cedar forests around Oatmanville attracted settlers, particularly from the Appalachian Mountains, due to high demand for lumber-related production. Due to the increased demand for cedar, localized conflicts broke out between woodcutters. In 1870, a post office named Oak Hill was established, though the community would not immediately adopt that name.

During the construction of the Texas State Capitol in Downtown Austin during the 1880s, stone quarries near the community were used for the capitol building's construction, resulting in a boom in the community's economy. The construction project also spurred the creation of the Austin and Oatmanville Railway, which was purposed to ship limestone from the community to the city, and was later abandoned in 1888. In 1904, Oak Hill's population grew in excess of 200 people, doubling by the 1970s. In 1910, the local post office was discontinued, with mail forwarding to the city of Austin instead. Nearly a century later in 2000, the area defined as Oak Hill was absorbed into Austin's city limits.

=== Demographics ===
When the area around Oak Hill was first settled in the 1830s and 1840s, there was very little population growth. However, as a result of demand for limestone to construct the Texas State Capitol and demand for cedar wood in the latter half of the 19th century, the population of Oak Hill quickly grew, reaching 200 by 1904. The community's population doubled between 1904 and the 1970s to 400, and then grew even faster with the development of suburban housing in the region. By 1990, the population of Oak Hill was 11,572. Over the ensuing decade, the combined Oak Hill planning area saw rapid population growth, more than twice as rapid as the Greater Austin metropolitan area. West Oak Hill saw population growth three times greater than Austin in the same time period.

As of 2000, the total population of the combined planning area was 24,233 people, with slightly more than half of that in East Oak Hill. Of the total population of the combined planning area in 2000, 77.7% were white, 2.1% were black, 14.1% were Hispanic, 4.3% were Asian, and another 1.8% were considered to be of other races. There were 10,541 housing units at an average density of 606.5 per square mile (247.2/km^{2}). The median family income for West Oak Hill was $77,208, compared to $89,262 for East Oak Hill.

== Geography ==
The area upon which Oak Hill is located is characterized by mostly hilly terrain. Limestone rimrock structures are commonplace in Oak Hill. The community is located above the Edwards and Trinity aquifers, resulting in the abundance of caves, sinkholes, karst features, and springs, which allow for recharge and discharge of groundwater. In addition, Barton, Slaughter, and Williamson creeks, which all lead to the nearby Colorado River, flow through Oak Hill. Riparian woodlands exist along areas of these creeks. Threatened bird species, including the golden-cheeked warbler (Setophaga chrysoparia) and the black-capped vireo (Vireo atricapilla) live in some areas of Oak Hill.

=== Boundaries ===
As Oak Hill is not an incorporated community, it does not have any legal boundaries. The community of neighborhoods is centered around the intersection of U.S. Route 290/TX-71 and Williamson Creek, roughly 8 mi (13 km) southwest of the center of Austin. The Oak Hill Association of Neighborhoods (OHAN) defines Oak Hill as "...starting from Travis Country in the Northwest, neighborhoods bordering Brodie Lane down to the Travis/Hays County line, following the county line on the south up to Highway 290 West, and then neighborhoods bordering Circle Drive and Thomas Springs Road and finally along the Southwest Parkway." The boundaries defined by OHAN include areas within six ZIP codes and 89 neighborhoods, including Circle C Ranch. However, only 29 neighborhood homeowners' associations are members of OHAN. The city of Austin defines West Oak Hill and East Oak Hill as neighborhood planning areas, encompassing areas adjacent to U.S. Route 290 from Circle Drive to a location slightly east of Texas State Highway Loop 1. Spanning 11,123 acres (45.01 km^{2}), the neighborhood planning area is Austin's largest.

Climate data for Sunset Valley
Month	Jan	Feb	Mar	Apr	May	Jun	Jul	Aug	Sep	Oct	Nov	Dec	Year
Record high °F (°C)	90 (32)	99 (37)	98 (37)	99 (37)	104 (40)	109 (43)	109 (43)	112 (44)	112 (44)	100 (38)	91 (33)	90 (32)	112 (44)
Mean daily maximum °F (°C)	62 (17)	65 (18)	72 (22)	80 (27)	87 (31)	92 (33)	96 (36)	97 (36)	91 (33)	82 (28)	71 (22)	62 (17)	74 (23)
Mean daily minimum °F (°C)	41 (5)	45 (7)	51 (11)	59 (15)	67 (19)	72 (22)	74 (23)	75 (24)	69 (21)	61 (16)	51 (11)	42 (6)	59 (15)
Record low °F (°C)	−2 (−19)	−1 (−18)	18 (−8)	30 (−1)	40 (4)	51 (11)	57 (14)	58 (14)	41 (5)	30 (−1)	20 (−7)	4 (−16)	−2 (−19)
Average precipitation inches (mm)	2.22 (56)	2.02 (51)	2.76 (70)	2.09 (53)	4.41 (112)	4.33 (110)	1.88 (48)	2.35 (60)	2.99 (76)	3.88 (99)	2.96 (75)	2.40 (61)	34.29 (871)
Source: Weather.com

== Government and infrastructure ==
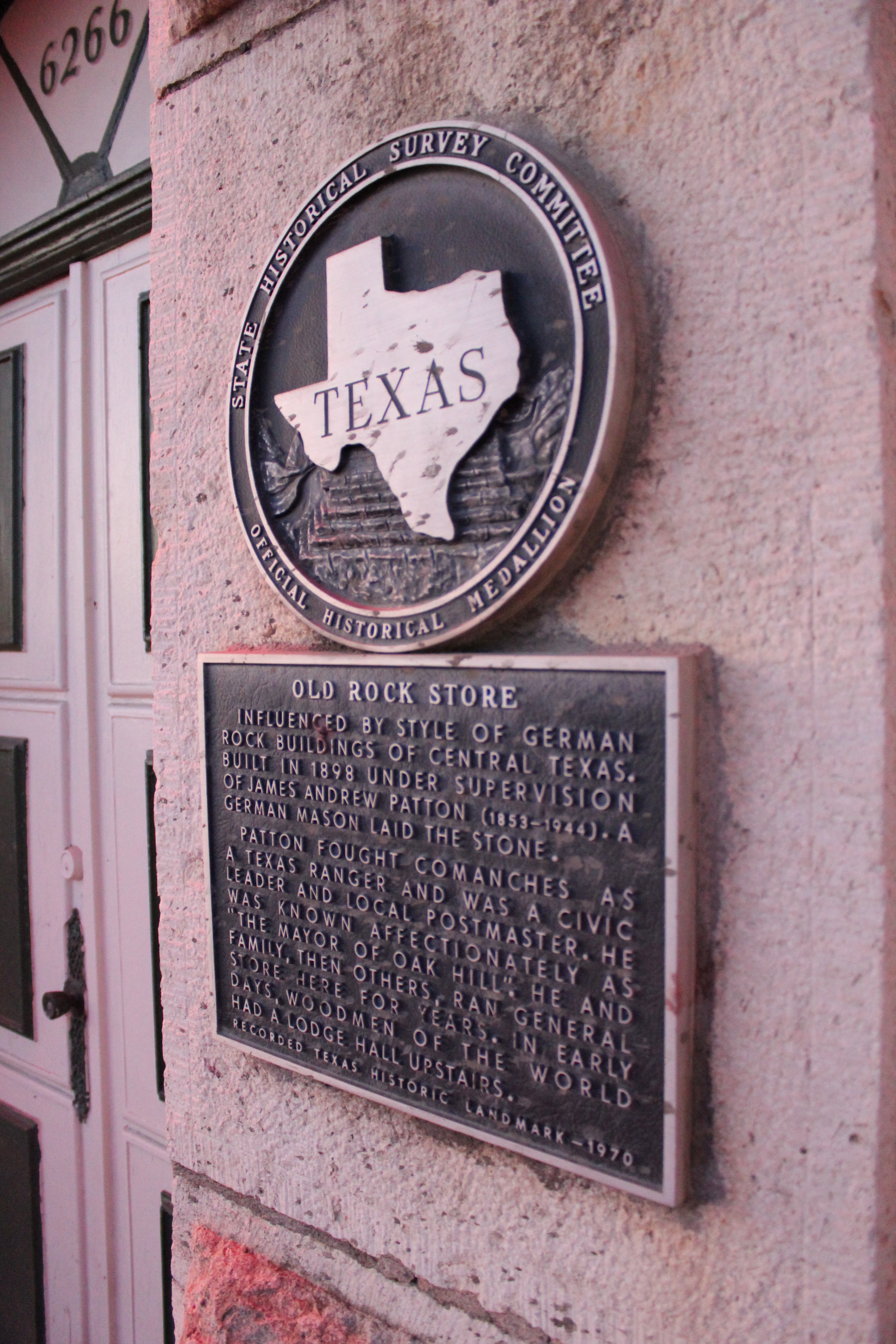
Historical marker at the local Austin Pizza Garden, formerly the Old Rock Store

The Oak Hill community was fully annexed by the city of Austin in 1989, though some areas of Oak Hill were already annexed by the city in the years prior. However, areas of the community designated as official city planning areas are not within city borders, but are nonetheless within the purview of extraterritorial jurisdiction. Within Austin's municipal government, Austin City Council District 8 primarily covers the Oak Hill area in addition to other parts of southwest Austin, a change which went into effect in November 2013. Several neighborhood associations in the area are part of OHAN, which meets monthly to propose changes and receive input on infrastructure and community decisions for Oak Hill. The association of neighborhoods is led by a board of directors elected by members of the association annually.

On a county level, the Oak Hill area, in addition to much of southwestern Travis County, is under the jurisdiction of Travis County Commissioner Precinct 3. The United States Postal Service maintains a post office in Oak Hill, located adjacent to U.S. 290 on 6104 Old Fredericksburg Road.

=== Emergency and medical services ===
Areas of Oak Hill within Austin city limits are served by the Austin Fire Department (AFD). The first AFD fire station specifically purposed to serve the Oak Hill area was constructed in August 1999. However, Oak Hill is also served by the Oak Hill Volunteer Fire Department, which was founded in April 1968. The fire department was originally assigned to an area "...from Brodie Lane to Barton Creek, and from Sunset Valley to Dripping Springs." However, in 1992, the expansion of Austin's city boundaries limited the fire department's coverage area to unincorporated regions of Travis County. Today, the department serves 22,000 people in a 48 mi^{2} (120 km^{2}) region in the southwestern part of the county.

Areas inside the Austin city limits are served by the Austin Police Department. The Southwest Patrol, headquartered at 539-A West Oltorf Road, patrols Oak Hill. Unincorporated areas are served by Travis County Sheriff's Office Constable Precinct 3.

CommUnityCare, a health care provider, operates the Oak Hill Health Center at 8656-A Texas State Highway 71 West. CommUnityCare was formerly Community Health Centers, a department of the City of Austin. In March 2009 the department became a 501(c) (3) non-profit corporation.

== Transportation ==
Currently, the Texas Department of Transportation (TxDOT) is working to expand highway 290/71, the Oak Hill Parkway project. TxDOT is constructing a state of the art roadway designed to improve traffic and mobility in the area around the “Y” interchange where US-290 and TX-71 meet. The project is estimated to be completed sometime in 2026.

Oak Hill Park and Ride serves as a commuter hub for Capital Metropolitan Transportation Authority, providing flier service from Southwest Austin into the center of Austin. As of December 2013, the Park and Ride is located at the Austin Community College District Pinnacle campus.

== Education ==
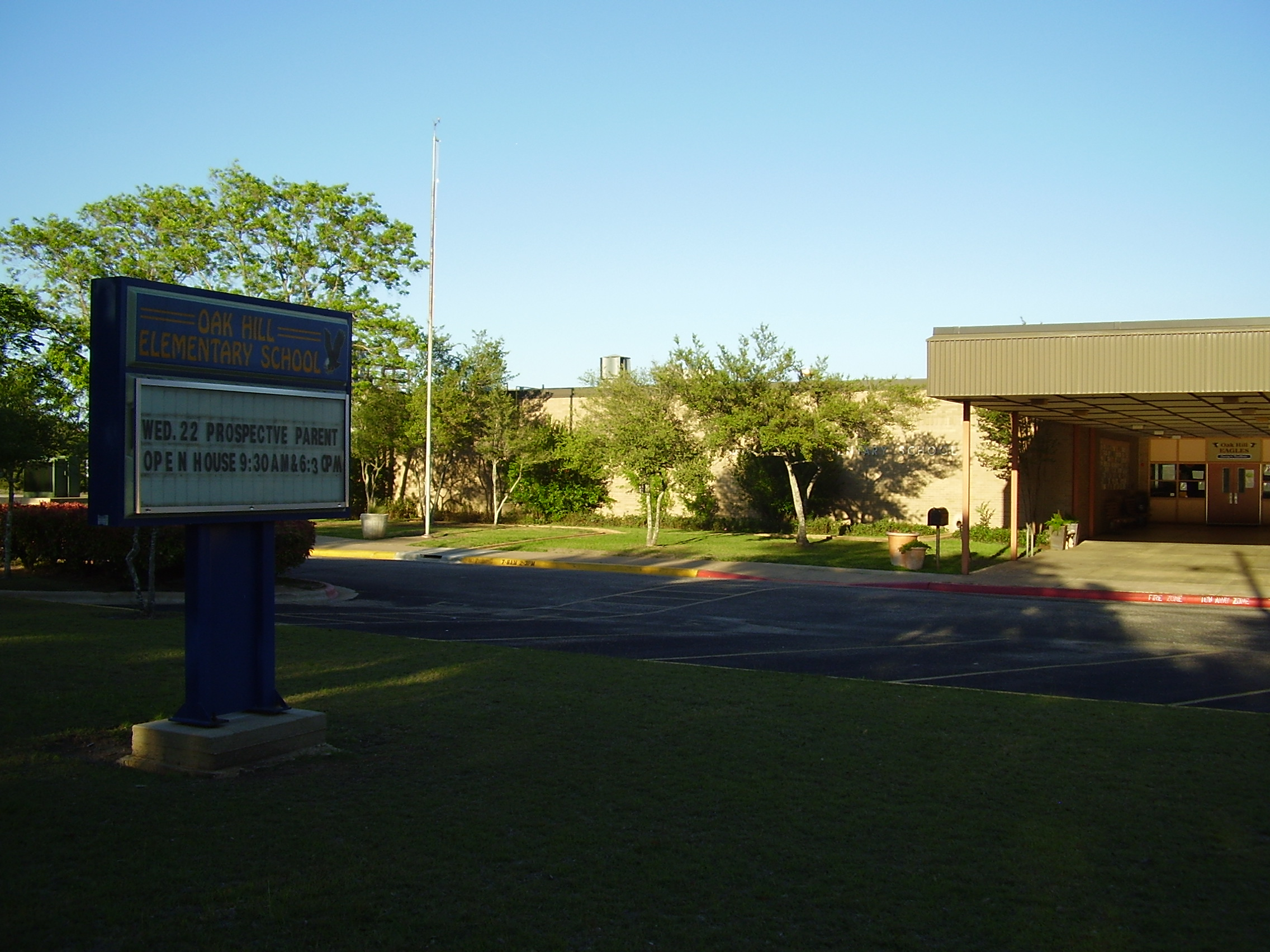
Oak Hill Elementary School

The Oak Hill area is within the Austin Independent School District. Public elementary schools serving Oak Hill include Boone, Cowan, Galindo, Kiker, Kokurek, Menchaca, Mills, Oak Hill, and Patton. Public middle schools serving Oak Hill include Bailey, Covington, O. Henry, and Small. Public high schools serving Oak Hill include Akins, Austin, Bowie, and Travis.

Oak Hill Elementary School was built in 1974. The current Austin High School campus was built in 1975. Menchaca was built in 1977. Patton was built in 1985. Covington, Galindo, and Kocurek were built in 1986. Bowie was built in 1988. Kiker was built in 1992. Bailey was built in 1993. Small and Mills were built in 1998. Cowan was built in 1999. Akins was built in 2000.

=== Private schools ===
Private schools in the area include Regents School of Austin (K–12), Austin City Academy (K–12), Austin Waldorf School(K–12), St. Andrew's Episcopal School (Upper campus, 9–12, is in Oak Hill), and Cedars Montessori School of Oak Hill. Waldorf opened in 1980. Regents opened on August 31, 1992.

=== Community colleges ===
Austin Community College operates the ACC Pinnacle Campus.

=== Public libraries ===
Austin Public Library operates the Hampton Branch at Oak Hill at 5125 Convict Hill Road. The 8,400-square-foot (780 m^{2}) library, funded by a 1992 bond campaign, opened on April 26, 1997.

== Notable people ==
Notable residents (former or present) include:

- Bob Trocolor (1917–1984) – born in Oak Hill; NFL player, college football and basketball head coach; movie actor
- Thomas Bruce White Sr. (1881–1971) born in Oak Hill; an American law officer and prison warden. He is known for solving the complex and notorious Osage murder case

== See also ==
- Manchaca, Texas
- Bee Cave, Texas
- Bear Creek, Texas
