= Anti-Western =

The term Anti-Western may refer to:

- Anti-Western sentiment, negative sentiments and animosities towards people from the West
- Revisionist Western or anti-Western (genre), in cinematography - particular genre of the Western movies.

== See also ==
- Anti-Eastern (disambiguation)
- Anti-Western sentiment in China
