= Paul Sinacore =

American casting director and actor

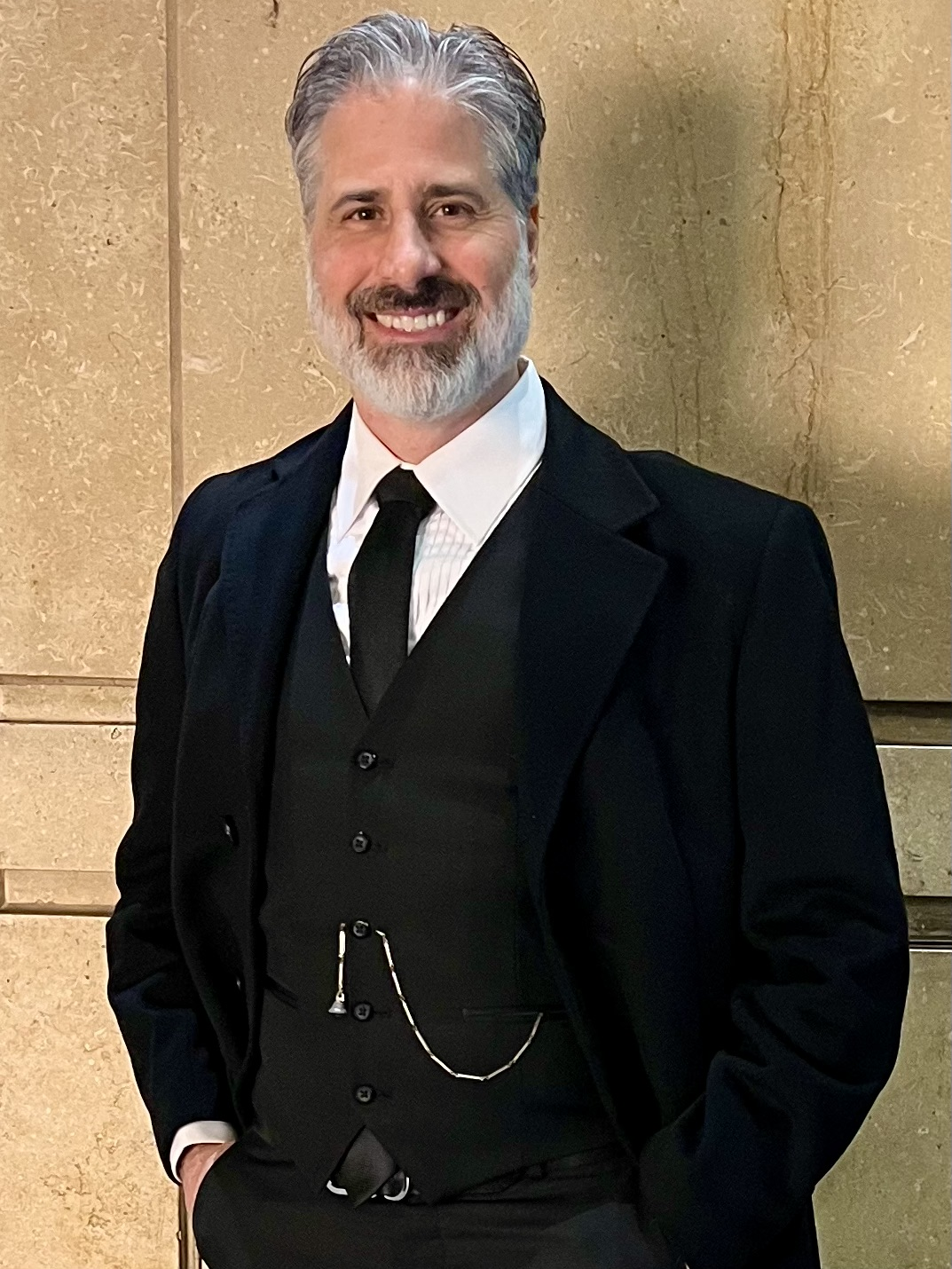
Photo of casting director Paul Sinacore.

Paul Sinacore is an American casting director and actor based in Los Angeles. He is credited as the casting director of CLIKA and has worked as a casting director on documentary and unscripted titles, including Netflix releases.

== Early life and education ==
Sinacore earned a B.A. from University of California, Los Angeles, completing a dual major in psychology and anthropology.

== Career ==
Sinacore joined the Screen Actors Guild in 1996 and later moved into casting and producing work in film and television. In 2021, he founded the casting company Paul Sinacore Casting.

In 2026, Sinacore served as casting director on CLIKA, released through Columbia Pictures (a Sony Pictures Entertainment company). Box office tracking sites reported the film's release pattern and opening-weekend performance. Sinacore is also credited as an actor in the film, appearing as “Jim.”

Sinacore is a member of the Casting Society and the Television Academy.

== Awards and nominations ==
- Sinacore received an 41st Artios Awards nomination from the Casting Society for his work on Unsolved Mysteries.
- As a producer on the horror featurette Babushka, Sinacore was among the listed producers for the film's festival presentation, and the title received a jury award at Film Invasion Los Angeles in 2025.

== Selected filmography ==
=== Casting director ===
- CLIKA (2026)
- Unknown Number: The High School Catfish
- My Father, the BTK Killer
- Eli Roth Presents: The Legion of Exorcists
- Unsolved Mysteries (Netflix revival)

=== Actor ===
- CLIKA (role: Jim)

=== Producer ===
- Babushka

=== Affiliations ===
- Casting Society (CSA)
- Television Academy
- SAG-AFTRA
