= Roborock =

Chinese consumer goods company

- Logo used since 2016
- Native name: 北京石头世纪科技有限公司
- Type: Public company
- Industry: Manufacturing
- Founded: 2014
- Headquarters: Beijing, China
- Products: Robotic vacuum cleaner
- Website: www.roborock.com

Beijing Roborock Technology Co. Ltd., branded as Roborock, is a Chinese consumer goods company known for its robotic sweeping and mopping devices and handheld cordless stick vacuums.

== History ==
Beijing Roborock Technology Co. Ltd. was founded in 2014 in Beijing, China, and was invested into by Xiaomi a few months after. The company raised about $640 million in its February 2020 IPO, and the company had annual revenue of approximately CNY 4.5 billion as of August 2021.

Roborock went public on Beijing's STAR market in 2020.

== Products ==
=== Vacuum cleaners ===
The "S" line of robot vacuums, introduced in 2018, have an integrated obstacle avoidance system to discern objects down to 5 cm wide by 3 cm high. As the cleaners move about a space, they create a schematic map, marking objects to be avoided later.

Roborock has claimed that their floor cleaning devices do not store images or upload them to the cloud and that all captured images are immediately deleted after processing.

ReactiveAI 2.0 was introduced with the release of the Roborock S7 MaxV. It has an RGB camera and 3D structured light scanning with a neural processor for object recognition regardless of lighting conditions.

In addition to their front-mounted cameras, newer devices use top-mounted LiDAR to map rooms. Using an app, users can set off-limits areas to ensure the device does not clean there. Users can also set "no-mop" areas where the device may vacuum but not mop.

Roborock Q7 Max, released in 2022, can be controlled by Alexa, Siri, or Google Assistant.

In 2023, Roborock released the S8, S8 Plus, and S8 Pro Ultra. The main difference between the models is the docking station each includes. The S8 has a standard charging base, whereas the S8 Plus includes an automatic emptying dock. The S8 and S8 Plus have dual brush rolls, but they do not lift. All models that precede the S8 have a single brush roll.

The Roborock S7 MaxV Ultra incorporates a livestreaming camera. Roborock S7, which debuted at CES 2021. The S7 can detect the type of floor to use either its mop or its vacuum. Its dustbin measures 460 mL at full capacity. It can vacuum approximately 250 square meters between charges. The S4 model does not mop.

In 2022, Roborock released the Q5, which replaces the S models and is similar to the S4 Max and the S5. The Q5 has higher suction power but lacks the mop feature. In January 2025, Roborock introduced its Saros 10 model. They also introduced the Saros 10R and the Saros Z70. The Saros Z70 has a robotic arm to put small clothing items away and move abstractions out of its path.

=== Washing machines ===
In 2023, the company introduced its first washing machine, the Roborock Zeo One with an integrated dryer. Like the Zeo One, subsequent models can be controlled by Roborock's smartphone app.
