= Standard Oil (disambiguation) =

Standard Oil most commonly refers to an American oil company that operated from 1870 to 1911

Standard Oil may also refer to one of these successors of the original Standard Oil:

- Standard Oil of Brazil
- Standard Oil of California, later rebranded to Chevron
- Standard Oil of Illinois
- Standard Oil of Indiana, also called Stanolind, then Amoco, which merged with BP
- Standard Oil of Iowa
- Standard Oil of Kansas, spun off from Kentucky Standard
- Standard Oil of Kentucky, or Kyso, today part of Chevron
- Standard Oil of Louisiana, formed by New Jersey Standard
- Standard Oil of Minnesota
- Standard Oil of Missouri, spun off from Kentucky Standard
- Standard Oil of Nebraska, spun off from Indiana Standard
- Standard Oil of New Jersey, today part of ExxonMobil
- Standard Oil of New York, today part of ExxonMobil
- Standard Oil of Ohio, also called Sohio, which merged with BP
