= 13D =

13D, 13d or XIII-D may refer to:

- Rule 13D, United States Securities and Exchange Commission rule
- Schedule 13d, United States Securities and Exchange Commission rule
- Stalag XIII-D, a German Army World War II prisoner-of-war camp in Nürnberg
- 13D Research, an institutional global research firm
