= Bond Tender Offer =

A Bond Tender Offer (BTO), also called a Debt Tender Offer (DTO), is a corporate finance term denoting the process of a firm retiring its debt by making an offer to its bondholders to repurchase a specific number of bonds at a specified price and specified time. Firms use these offers to refinance or restructure their current capital structure.

On the open market, many debt securities trade below their face value, thus making repurchase of debt attractive to a firm. In the case of a BTO, the firm offers to buy bonds above their market value, although still below face value. However, these are generally non-negotiable with the offeree since only a minimum amount of the bond repurchases are allowed.

== See also ==
- Tender offer
- Bond exchange offer
- Mini-tender offer
- Mergers and acquisitions
