= Conoco =

American petroleum company

Conoco Inc.
- Formerly: Continental Oil and Transportation Company (1875–1911); Continental Oil Company (1911–1999); Conoco, Inc. (1999–2002)
- Type: Privately held company (1875–1884); Public company (1911–1981; 1998–2002); Brand (2002–present)
- Traded as: NYSE: COC (1998–2002)
- Industry: Petroleum
- Predecessor: Standard Oil Company (1911); Marland Oil Company (1929)
- Founded: November 25, 1875; 150 years ago in Ogden, Utah
- Founder: Isaac Elder Blake
- Defunct: August 30, 2002 (as a company)
- Fate: Merged with Phillips Petroleum, remaining as a brand
- Successors: ConocoPhillips (2002); Phillips 66 Company (2012)
- Headquarters: Westchase, Houston, Texas
- Area served: Worldwide
- Products: Gasoline; convenience store; Select locations: Car wash; repair shop; fast food restaurants
- Owner: Phillips 66 Company
- Website: conoco.com

Conoco (/ˈkɒnəkoʊ/ KON-ə-koh), formerly known as Continental Oil, is an American petroleum brand that has been operating under the ownership of the Phillips 66 Company since 2012. It is headquartered in the Westchase neighborhood of Houston, Texas. The brand is one of the several successors of the original Standard Oil Company ("oil trust" founded 1870 by John D. Rockefeller). Continental Oil was a subsidiary of Standard Oil from 1884 until 1911 when the Supreme Court of the United States, in an anti-trust legal case, ruled to decouple and break up the monopolized entity of Standard Oil.

Alongside Phillips 66 and 76, it operates as one of the major fuel brands of the Phillips 66 Company. Of those two brands, Conoco has a more dominant presence of gas refueling stations in Colorado, Texas, Montana, Missouri, and Oklahoma in the Midwestern United States, as well as a growing presence in Eastern Pennsylvania following taking over the retail contracts of several Gulf Oil locations there, while having a complete absence in states such as California to the west and Florida to the far southeast.

Continental Oil was founded in Ogden, Utah, by Isaac Elder Blake in November 1875 as the Continental Oil and Transportation Company. It was acquired in 1884 by the increasingly dominant Standard Oil Company. Marland Oil Company was founded in 1921 by E. W. Marland (1874–1941), oilman, businessman and later politician of Pennsylvania and later Oklahoma. Eighteen years after Standard Oil's federal court-ordered dissolution of 1911, Marland Oil acquired Continental Oil, and moved its headquarters to Marland's home town of Ponca City, Oklahoma, in 1929.

As the Continental-Marland acquisition took effect, Marland Oil favorably phased out its own name and rebranded itself into the more nationally known Continental and Conoco nameplates. It eventually became one of the largest oil companies in the United States, and further expanded its operations globally during the 1970s.

Like other oil companies, Conoco's operations were negatively impacted by the 1970s energy crisis, which was caused in part by the 1973–1974 Arab oil embargo. In 1981, Conoco then the ninth-largest American oil company at the time, was embroiled in one of the most expensive corporate takeovers in U.S. history when the Mobil Corporation and Seagram attempted to acquire the company. The DuPont company, of Wilmington, Delaware, was brought in as a so-called "white knight" by Ralph Bailey (the CEO of Conoco at the time). DuPont defended Conoco against the takeover. DuPont's acquisition of Conoco at US$1.5 billion, made it the largest merger in U.S. history up to that time, surpassing that of the earlier Shell Oil’s acquisition of the Belridge Oil Company at USD3.5 billion dollars in 1979. Almost two decades later, in 1998, DuPont and Conoco announced their intentions to split. DuPont sold 30% of its interest that year and the remaining 70% the following year in July 1999, completing the corporate separation.

The company operated its own oil refineries until 2002, when it was merged with the Phillips Petroleum Company to form ConocoPhillips. A decade later, ConocoPhillips divested its downstream operations (that consisted of its gas stations refueling operations under the brands of Conoco, Phillips 66, and 76) as the separate Phillips 66 Company.

== History ==
The "Continental Oil and Transportation Company" was founded by Isaac Elder Blake in November 1875 in Ogden, Utah. The company distributed the recently harnessed mineral resource of petroleum, which had first been identified in a commercially extractable concentration in August 1859 by Edwin Drake (1819–1880), in a well drilled at Oil Creek, near Titusville, (Crawford County), in the far northwestern corner of Pennsylvania). Continental distributed in the Western United States, and included the petroleum by-products of kerosene, benzene, and others. Continental Oil Company was acquired by Standard Oil Company in 1884, and was spun off during the Standard Oil divestiture in 1911.

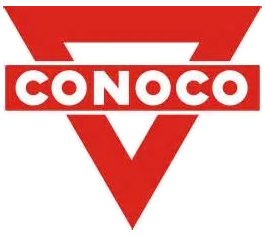
Conoco logo of 1930, after its acquisition by Marland Oil Co.

Marland Oil Company, which had been founded by exploration pioneer E. W. Marland, acquired the Continental Oil Company in 1929, and the main office was moved to Ponca City, Oklahoma. Marland Oil acquired the assets (subject to liabilities) of Continental Oil Company for a consideration of 2,317,266 shares of stock. The merged company took the more recognizable Continental name along with the Conoco brand. However, it adopted Marland's red triangle logo, which it retained until 1970, when the capsule logo was adopted.

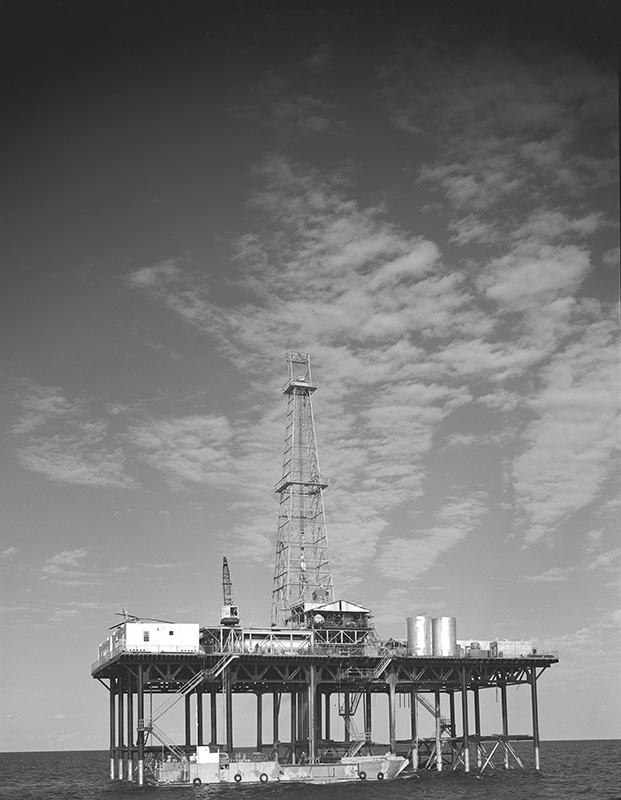
Conoco offshore oil well drilling platform, Gulf of Mexico, c.1955

Dan Moran (1888–1948) succeeded Marland Oil Company founder E. W. Marland as president of Marland Oil in 1928, and became the first president of the merged Conoco. Moran then ran Conoco for twenty years, seeing the company through economic hardships and challenges of the Great Depression of the 1930s, and retiring in 1947, the year before he died. The company ran into trouble when, shortly after acquisition, it was hit by the Wall Street Crash of October 1929. Conoco became a key supplier to the United States federal government and its world-wide deployment of the United States Armed Forces, along with several other Allied powers and their militaries during the World War II.

Under the leadership of successor Leonard F. McCollum, Conoco grew from a regional petroleum company to a global corporation in the post-war years of the late 1940s and into the 1950s. Another upheaval for the company came two decades later during the 1970s energy crisis, which began with the 1973–1974 Arab oil embargo following the fourth Arab-Israeli conflict of the Yom Kippur War of October 1973. The company did not fully recover until 1981, when Conoco became a subsidiary of former corporate rival but then white knight DuPont company of Wilmington, Delaware.

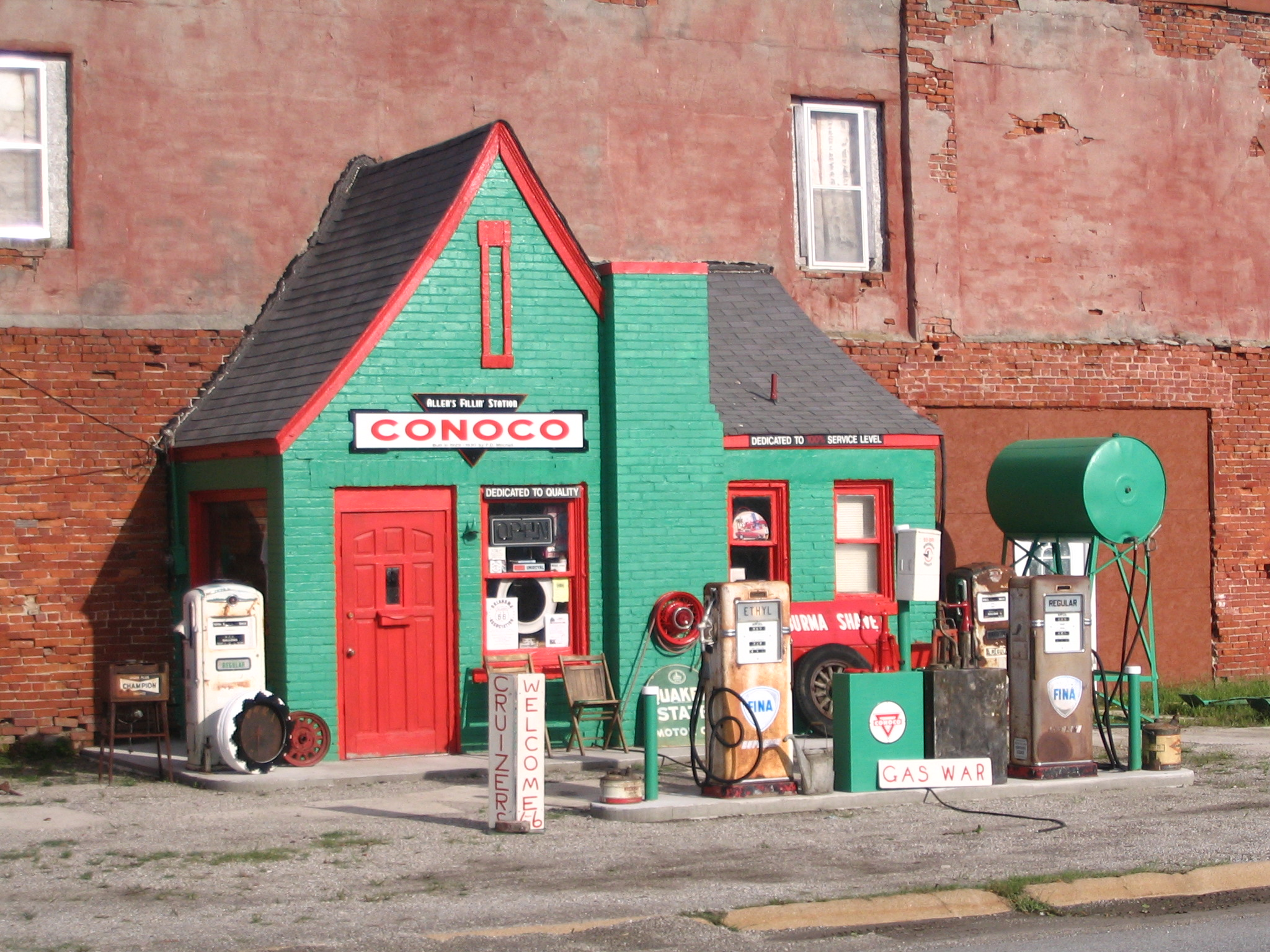
Former Conoco service station in Commerce, Oklahoma (2008)

In 1981, Dome Petroleum made a tender offer for 20% of Conoco. More than 50% of Conoco shares were tendered, evidence that shareholders were unhappy, and several companies made their own tender offers to take over Conoco. Cash-rich and wanting to diversify, Seagram Company Ltd. engineered a takeover of Conoco. Although Seagram acquired a 32.2% stake in Conoco, DuPont was brought in as a white knight by the oil company and entered the bidding war. Mobil Corporation, the nation's second-largest oil company at the time, also joined the bid, and borrowed $5 billion to bid for Cocono. In the end, Seagram and Mobil lost out in the Conoco bidding war. In exchange for its stake in Conoco Inc, Seagram became a 24.3% owner (almost one-quarter of stock/interest) of the DuPont company. By 1995, Seagram was DuPont's largest single shareholder with four seats on the board of directors.

In 1998, DuPont sold 30% of Conoco, and in 1999, DuPont sold the remaining 70% stake it held in Conoco Inc. When the independent Conoco went public in October 1998, under its original name, Continental Oil Company, it resulted in the largest IPO in history. In 2001, Conoco announced it has agreed to buy Gulf Canada for C$6.7 billion (US$4.3 billion). Conoco merged with Phillips Petroleum in 2002 to form ConocoPhillips.

== Corporate headquarters ==
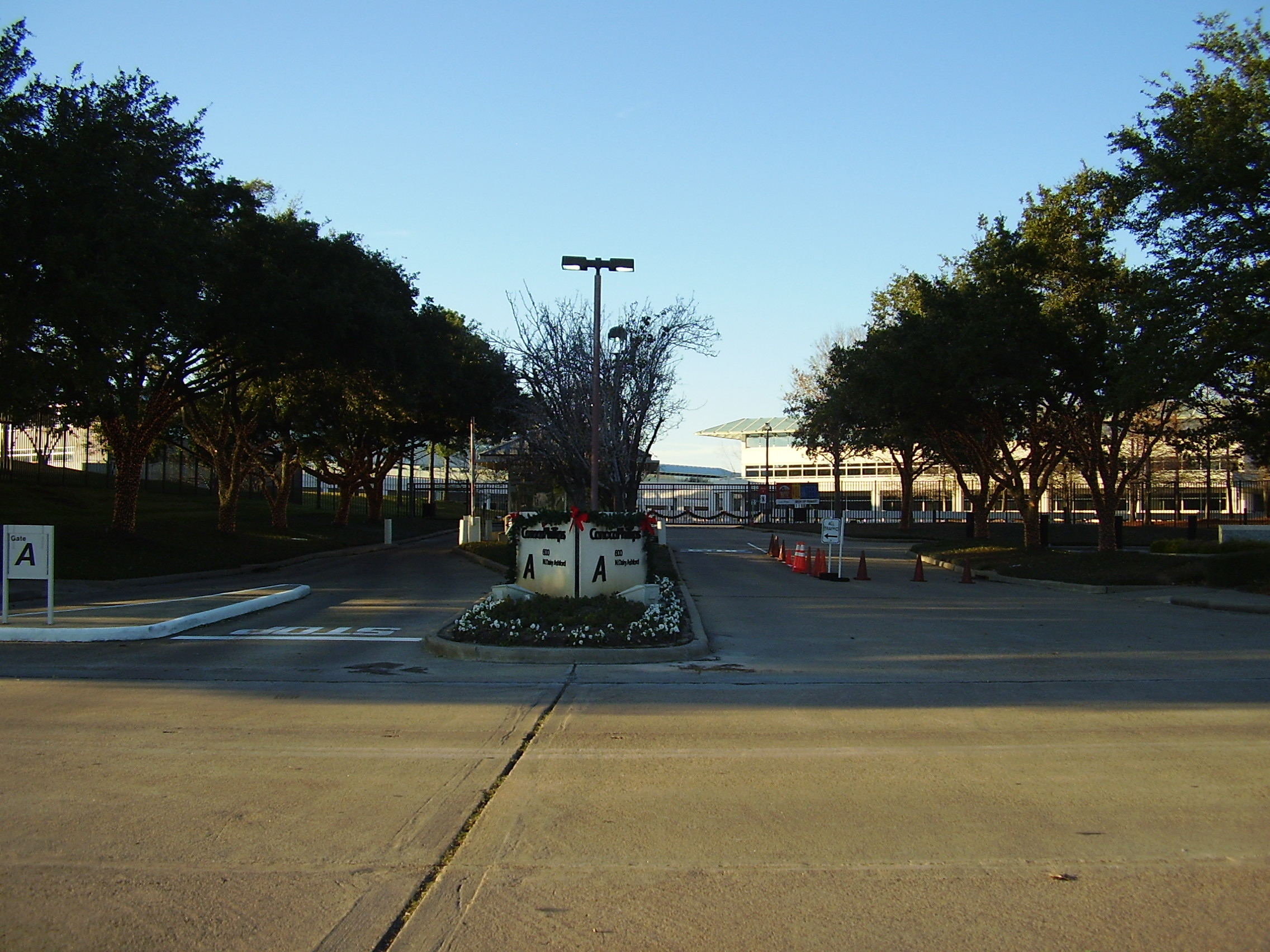
ConocoPhillips headquarters in the Energy Corridor area of Houston

Before the merger, Conoco had its headquarters in the Conoco Center of Houston, Texas, which became the ConocoPhillips headquarters in the city's Energy Corridor.

Conoco had been headquartered in Houston since 1949. In 1965, the headquarters moved to New York City. In 1972, it moved slightly northeast to nearby suburban Stamford, Connecticut, where occupied space in the three-story High Ridge Park commercial complex for the next decade. In 1982, DuPont announced it was closing the Stamford headquarters a decade before its lease ran out, to relocate Conoco south to Wilmington, Delaware, where DuPont's headquarters were located since its founding almost 222 years earlier in 1802. The move occurred in 1982. DuPont chairman Edward G. Jefferson said that the move would bring the head workforces of the two companies together.

== Conoco–Iran deal ==
In 1995, Conoco Inc. was awarded a contract by the Islamic Republic of Iran to develop a huge offshore oilfield in the adjacent Persian Gulf to the south. It was the first energy agreement involving Iran and the United States since Washington severed diplomatic relations 15 years before with Tehran in 1979–1980, during the American Embassy invasion, seizure and occupation there by mobs of student activists and taking U.S. diplomats hostage for a year in the Iran hostage crisis. The contract was signed after three years of protracted negotiations. However, the company dropped the plan after the White House announced that after further consideration and consultation, that 42nd President Bill Clinton would issue a directive blocking all such transactions on national security grounds.

== Museum ==
The official Conoco historical museum was completed in 2007 and is located in Ponca City, Oklahoma, along with the preserved 1914 mansion Marland Grand Home on Grand Avenue, residence of co-founder E. W. (Ernest Whitworth) Marland (1874–1941) and his two wives and adopted children.

== Leadership ==
=== President ===
1. Isaac E. Blake, 1877–1893
2. Henry M. Tilford, 1893–1907
3. Edward T. Wilson, 1907–1924
4. C. E. Strong, 1924–1927
5. Sidney H. Keoughan, 1927–1929
6. Daniel J. Moran, 1929–1947
7. Leonard F. McCollum, 1947–1964
8. Andrew W. Tarkington, 1964–1969
9. John G. McLean, 1969–1972
10. Howard W. Blauvelt, 1974
11. Dr John E. Kircher, 1974–1977
12. Ralph E. Bailey, 1977–1987
13. Constantine S. Nicandros, 1987–1995
14. Archie W. Dunham, 1996–2002

=== Chairman of the board ===
1. Edward T. Wilson, 1929–19??
2. Charles A. Perlitz Jr, 1963–1964
3. Leonard F. McCollum, 1964–1972
4. John G. McLean, 1972–1974
5. Howard W. Blauvelt, 1974–1979
6. Ralph E. Bailey, 1979–1987
7. Constantine S. Nicandros, 1995–1996
8. Edgar S. Woolard Jr., 1998–1999
9. Archie W. Dunham, 1999–2002

== Bibliography ==
- Mathews, John Joseph (1992). Life and Death of an Oil Man: The Career of E. W. Marland (1951 ed.). Norman, Oklahoma: University of Oklahoma Press. ISBN 0-8061-1238-7.
- Conoco: The First One Hundred Years. Dell Publishing, 1975.
