= Form 13F =

U.S. government filing

Form 13F is a quarterly report filed, per United States Securities and Exchange Commission regulations, by "institutional investment managers" with control over $100M in assets to the SEC, listing all equity assets under management. Academic researchers make these reports freely available as structured datasets.

Form 13F provides position-level disclosure of all institutional investment managers with more than $100m in assets under management with relevant long US holdings. All US-listed equity securities (including ETFs) in the manager's portfolio are included and detailed according to the number of shares, the ticker, the issuer name, etc. The full list of securities currently covered by form 13F includes more than 17,500 securities. Form 13F covers institutional investment managers, which include Registered Investment Advisers (RIAs), banks, insurance companies, hedge funds, trust companies, pension funds, mutual funds, among natural persons or entities with investment discretion over its own account or another's. For example, an investment adviser that manages private accounts, mutual fund assets, or pension plan assets is an institutional investment manager.

Short positions are not required to be disclosed on Form 13F, nor subtracted from long positions that are reported. In 2015, the New York Stock Exchange and the National Investor Relations Institute submitted a petition to the SEC supporting a requirement for disclosure of short positions on Form 13F.

After meeting the $100 million filing threshold during a calendar year, a manager must submit Form 13F within 45 days after the end of that year's fourth quarter and within 45 days after each of the next three calendar quarters; a deadline falling on a weekend or holiday moves to the next business day.

Both the Chartered Alternative Investment Analyst (CAIA) designation and the CFA Institute make special mention of 13F-based analysis for due diligence and monitoring of investment managers, as well as investment-idea-generation. CAIA includes discussion of in its study materials, as well. Absent access to privileged access to manager holdings, Form 13F provides a baseline level of data with which to analyze investment manager exposures, performance attribution, and associated risks.

== See also ==
- Schedule 13D
- Schedule 13G
- Schedule TO
