= Tender offer =

Public invitation of stockholders by potential acquirers of a public corporation

In corporate finance, a tender offer is a type of public takeover bid. The tender offer is a public, open offer or invitation (usually announced in a newspaper advertisement) by a prospective acquirer to all stockholders of a publicly traded corporation (the target corporation) to tender their stock for sale at a specified price during a specified time, subject to the tendering of a minimum and maximum number of shares. In a tender offer, the bidder contacts shareholders directly; the directors of the company may or may not have endorsed the tender offer proposal.

To induce the shareholders of the target company to sell, the acquirer's offer price is usually at a premium over the current market price of the target company's shares. For example, if a target corporation's stock was trading at $10 per share, an acquirer might offer $11.50 per share to shareholders on the condition that 51% of shareholders agree. Cash or securities may be offered to the target company's shareholders, although a tender offer in which securities are offered as consideration is generally referred to as an "exchange offer".

== Governing law ==
=== United States ===
==== General ====
In the United States, tender offers are regulated by the Williams Act. SEC Regulation 14E also governs tender offers. It covers such matters as:

1. the minimum length of time a tender offer must remain open
2. procedures for modifying a tender offer after it has been issued
3. insider trading in the context of tender offers
4. whether one class of shareholders can receive preferential treatment over another

==== Required disclosures ====
In the United States, under the Williams Act, codified in Section 13(d) and Section 14(d)(1) of the Securities Exchange Act of 1934, a bidder must file Schedule TO with the SEC upon commencement of the tender offer. Among the matters required to be disclosed in schedule TO are: (i) a term sheet which summarizes the material terms of the tender offer in plain English; (ii) the bidder's identity and background; and (iii) the bidder's history with the target company. In addition, a potential acquirer must file Schedule 13D within 10 days of acquiring more than 5% of the shares of another company.

===== Tax consequence =====
The consummation of a tender offer resulting in payment to the shareholder is a taxable event triggering capital gains or losses, which may be long-term or short-term depending on the shareholder's holding period.

== See also ==
- Bond Tender Offer
- Bond exchange offer
- Mini-tender offer
- Mergers and acquisitions
- Contract awarding
- List of largest mergers and acquisitions
