= Schedule 13G =

Schedule 13G is an alternative SEC filing for the Schedule 13D which can be filed in lieu of Schedule 13D by anyone who acquires more than 5% ownership of a Section 13 security and qualifies for one of the exemptions available to the Schedule 13D filing requirement. The Schedule 13G filing is a shorter version of the Schedule 13D with fewer reporting requirements. Activist practices disqualify a filer from filing Schedule 13G and instead require a Schedule 13D filing.

== Schedule 13D exemptions ==
The following exemptions permit a filer to file Schedule 13G in lieu of Schedule 13D:

- Rule 13d-1(b) - Institutional Investors that acquire securities in the ordinary course of business and not with the intent nor with the effect of influencing control of the issuer.
- Rule 13d-1(c) - Passive Investors that have not acquired the security with the intent nor effect of influencing control over the issuer, are not an "institutional investor," and are not directly or indirectly the beneficial owner of 20% or more of the security.
- Rule 13d-1(d) - Exempt Investors under Section 13(d)(6)(A) or (B) of the Securities Exchange Act of 1934, or because the beneficial ownership was acquired before December 22, 1970, or because the person is otherwise not required to file a statement on Schedule 13D.

== Initial filing deadlines ==
- Institutional Investors must file within 45 days of the end of the year in which they finish above 5%, or within 10 days of first finishing a month above 10% if the initial filing has not yet been completed.
- Passive Investors must file within 10 days of acquiring 5% or more of the security.
- Exempt Investors must file within 45 days of the end of the year in which the person becomes obligated to file.

== Amendment requirements ==
- Institutional Investors must file an amendment to report any changes within 45 days of the end of the year, or within 10 days of first finishing a month above 10% and then within 10 days of any month-end where the holder's ownership increases or decreases by 5% or more.
- Passive Investors must file an amendment to report any changes within 45 days of the end of the year, or "promptly" (which is undefined but generally accepted to be within 10 days) upon the person's beneficial ownership exceeding 10% and then promptly thereafter whenever the person's beneficial ownership increases or decreases by more than 5%.
- Exempt Investors must file an amendment to report any changes within 45 days of the end of the year.

== See also ==
- Schedule 13D
- Form 13F
- Schedule TO

== Resources ==
SEC Homepage

Investor.gov Schedules 13 D/G

Section 13D/13G FAQ
