= Successors of Standard Oil =

Companies descended from Standard Oil

Chart detailing the history of some of the largest Standard Oil descendants; bold denotes extant corporations

Following the 1911 Supreme Court ruling that found Standard Oil was an illegal monopoly, the company was broken up into 39 different entities, divided primarily by region and activity. Many of these companies later became part of the Seven Sisters, which dominated global petroleum production in the 20th century, and became a majority of today's largest investor-owned oil companies, with most tracing their roots back to Standard Oil. Some descendants of Standard Oil were also given exclusive rights to the Standard Oil name.

Today, many of Standard Oil's 39 successor entities play roles in the oil industry, either on their own or through being acquired by other companies. Standard Oil of New Jersey, the controlling division of Standard Oil at the time of the 1911 breakup, continues to exist as ExxonMobil, formed from the merger of it and Standard Oil of New York. BP has also acquired many Standard Oil descendants, most notably Standard Oil of Ohio and Amoco (Standard Oil of Indiana). Saudi Aramco, the state-owned oil company of Saudi Arabia, also traces its origins to Standard Oil as the Arab kingdom founded it in a partnership with Standard Oil of California, today known as Chevron Corporation. Other companies themselves not primarily focused on the petroleum industry have owned or previously owned Standard Oil descendants, including U.S. Steel (which previously owned Marathon Oil), the first incarnation of DuPont (which previously owned Conoco), and Unilever (which presently owns Chesebrough and Vaseline). Among Standard Oil's largest non-petroleum descendants is the credit bureau TransUnion, which originally was divested from the Standard-descending Union Tank Car Company.

== Background ==
In the 1911 breakup, the Supreme Court found that Standard Oil conspired to restrain the trade and commerce in petroleum, and monopolized the commerce in petroleum, in violation of the Sherman Antitrust Act.

== Major direct descendants ==
Standard Oil's largest direct descendants which today are still their own independent companies are ExxonMobil, a merger of the Standard Oil Companies of New Jersey and New York, and Chevron, a rebranding of the Standard Oil Company of California since its own acquisition of Gulf Oil.

=== ExxonMobil (Standard Oil of New Jersey and New York, and Vacuum Oil) ===
ExxonMobil is mostly composed of the Standard Oil Company of New Jersey (Jersey Standard) and the Standard Oil Company of New York (Socony). The two companies partnered on a semi-frequent basis during their infancy before pursuing mergers and acquisitions, with Jersey Standard buying Texas-based Humble Oil and Socony merging with Standard descendant Vacuum Oil to form Socony-Vacuum. The two companies collaborated in certain cases, such as a joint ownership of Standard Vacuum Oil Company.

In retail, Jersey Standard used three brand names to market its products to American motorists: Esso, Enco, and Humble (after its acquisition). Jersey Standard preferred to sell as Esso in all states, though due to the formation of Esso being from a phonetic transliteration of the initials of Standard Oil (S.O.), courts prevented Jersey Standard from selling as Esso everywhere. To solve this, Jersey Standard announced it would rebrand all of its stations as Exxon in 1973, and changed its corporate name to that of Exxon Corporation simultaneously. Meanwhile, Socony-Vacuum gradually began to use Mobiloil and Mobilgas as trade names for its retail products, and the company eventually changed its name to Mobil Corporation in 1955.

In the late 1990s, the two companies began merger talks and the deal was closed with American regulatory approval (albeit with a nearly 2,500 retail station divesture) in November 1999. ExxonMobil today is the largest majority investor-owned oil and gas corporation in the world by market capitalization and revenue, ranking twelfth on the Fortune Global 500 in 2022, and 11th by market capitalization as of September 29, 2022.

=== Chevron (Standard Oil of California and Kentucky) ===
Originally an independent oil company known as the Pacific Coast Oil Company, Standard Oil acquired Pacific Coast in 1900, renaming it the Standard Oil Company of California and granting it the assets of Standard Oil of Iowa, assets that were retained by the CalSo breakup of the larger Standard Oil. From the 1930s onward, CalSo invested primarily in its namesake state as well as in the Arabian Peninsula, with its operations there eventually being fully bought out by Saudi Arabia's government in 1980 and merged into what is today known as Saudi Aramco. In 1961, CalSo acquired Standard Oil of Kentucky.

In 1985, CalSo purchased Gulf Oil, creating the third largest oil company in the United States (trailing only Exxon and Mobil) and becoming the largest merger in US history up to that point. Simultaneously, CalSo rebranded as Chevron Corporation, a trade name that had previously been in use by CalSo. Chevron made another acquisition in 2001, this time acquiring Texaco, and temporarily renaming itself to ChevronTexaco Corp. between 2001 and 2005. By this point, Chevron had become the second largest oil company in the United States. Today, Chevron is the 37th largest company in the world by revenue according to the Fortune Global 500, and the 24th largest by market capitalization as of September 30, 2022.

=== Saudi Aramco ===
After the 1911 breakup, Standard Oil of California signed an agreement with the Kingdom of Saudi Arabia to create a joint venture between the two. Originally named the Californian-Arabian Standard Oil Company and later the Arab American Oil Company, Saudi Arabia fully bought out Standard Oil of California's stake in 1980, with the company abbreviating its name to Saudi Aramco.

Given the Kingdom's oil resources, such as the Ghawar Field which remains the largest oil field in the world, Saudi Aramco is the largest company in the entire energy industry. In 2022, after Russia's invasion of Ukraine caused increased oil demand and skyrocketing earnings, Saudi Aramco recorded $161 billion in profit for the year, surpassing most privately owned oil majors' profits combined. Saudi Aramco has also held the title of the world's most valuable company by market cap and largest by revenue on some occasions, usually competing with American tech giant Apple for the title.

=== Marathon Oil and Marathon Petroleum (The Ohio Oil Company) ===
The state of Ohio, original home of Standard Oil, became the home of multiple Standard Oil descendants, two of the largest being The Ohio Oil Company and Standard Oil of Ohio. Purchased by Standard Oil in 1889, the company was originally founded in 1887 by a conglomeration of smaller Ohio oil producers. After the breakup, the company grew by purchasing the Transcontinental Oil Company in 1930. Not long after, the company created the brand name Marathon, renaming itself to Marathon Oil in 1962.

Marathon became the target of a hostile takeover by Mobil (Standard Oil of New York), though opted to sell itself instead to U.S. Steel. This lasted until 2001, when U.S. Steel (then known as USX Corporation) divested from Marathon. The company today split in 2012, with upstream operations continuing under the historical Marathon Oil name while downstream and retail operations are handled by Marathon Petroleum. Marathon Petroleum would subsequently acquire Andeavor in 2018 and gain ownership of fellow Standard spinoff ARCO, though ARCO's assets at this point were primarily from independent oil company Richfield Oil Company and not Standard spinoff Atlantic Petroleum, whose assets were eventually acquired by Sunoco.

Upstream assets held by Marathon Oil were acquired by ConocoPhillips, another Standard Oil descendant, when the company was bought in November 2024.

=== ConocoPhillips (Continental Oil and Transport Company) ===
Founded in the state of Utah in 1875 and acquired by Standard Oil in 1884, Conoco lasted 18 years as an independent company before it was purchased by Marland Oil Company. Marland, however, immediately took on the name Conoco. For 50 years, Conoco became a global oil behemoth (partly due to World War II), though the company was eventually purchased by DuPont, which itself retained ownership of Conoco until 1999. Debuting as one of the largest IPOs in history, Conoco merged with the Phillips Petroleum Company to form ConocoPhillips in the early 2000s. Similar to Marathon's business strategy, ConocoPhillips would later divest its downstream assets into a new company titled Phillips 66, which currently controls the original Conoco brand name.

ConocoPhillips acquired Marathon Oil, a fellow Standard Oil descendant, in November 2024.

== Major acquired descendants ==
=== Amoco (Standard Oil of Indiana), acquired by BP ===
Founded in 1889 by Standard Oil, Indiana Standard traded as Standard Oil of Indiana until 1985, though initially gained control of the Amoco name by purchasing the American Oil Company in 1925. Until this rebranding, Standard Oil of Indiana continued to use both Standard and Amoco as brand names, and for a time was the largest oil company in the world.

In 1998, British Petroleum acquired Amoco and rebranded as BP Amoco. At the time, the merger was the largest in the oil industry and the largest acquisition of an American corporation by a foreign one, and BP Amoco would become, at the time, the third largest oil company in the world, trailing only Exxon and Royal Dutch Shell. In 2001, however, BP Amoco reverted its name to BP, now currently in use today. However, BP slowly began to reintroduce Amoco as a brand name in 2017 to select US markets.

=== Atlantic Petroleum (Atlantic Refining Company), acquired by Sunoco ===
Founded in 1866 and acquired by Standard Oil in 1874, Atlantic Refining and Marketing was credited with opening the first modern gas station on Baum Boulevard in Pittsburgh in 1916 and would primarily be located on the East Coast of the United States until its 1966 merger with the Richfield Oil Company to form ARCO.

Following an unsuccessful purchase of Sinclair Oil Corporation and negative publicity with using methanol in Atlantic's old marketing territory, ARCO spun off the former Atlantic assets in 1985 with most of them being purchased by John Deuss and reviving the Atlantic name. However, Deuss would later sell Atlantic to Sunoco in 1988, who would eventually rebrand all Atlantic stations as Sunoco stations by the mid-1990s. Sunoco itself would be purchased by Energy Transfer Partners in 2012.

Remnants of Atlantic still exist, with ARCO being purchased by BP in 2000. ARCO was later sold off to Tesoro Corporation in 2013 (with BP retaining marketing rights in Northern California and the Pacific Northwest) and Tesoro itself (after briefly renaming itself Andeavor) being purchased by Marathon Petroleum in 2018, where ARCO continues as a brand name under Marathon. Sunoco retained Atlantic's convenience store chain, A-Plus, though most of these were sold off to 7-Eleven in 2018.

=== Sohio (Standard Oil of Ohio), acquired by BP ===
The original Standard Oil company was based in Ohio, though John D. Rockefeller moved Standard Oil's assets under the control of Standard Oil of New Jersey. After the breakup, the company continued primarily operating in Ohio, and entered a joint-venture with BP in Alaska during the 1960s. Such joint ventures eventually lead to BP's gradual acquisition of Sohio, completed in 1987 when BP renamed Sohio to BP America. Today, BP owns the rights to the Standard Oil name in Ohio, and is the largest gas station in the state with 491 BP-branded stations.

=== Pennzoil (South Penn Oil Company), acquired by Shell and Devon Energy ===
The South Penn Oil Company was founded in 1889 by Standard Oil, and eventually became the largest oil producer in the region after the breakup. While Pennzoil was used as a trade name by other firms, by 1950, South Penn had acquired all of them and subsequently renamed itself to Pennzoil. The company was also one of the bidders for Getty Oil, which erupted into a legal battle between itself and Texaco, with Pennzoil gaining US $3 billion from Texaco after a settlement.

Pennzoil split its energy and motor parts divisions in 1998, with the original Pennzoil company inheriting the energy production facilities and a new company, Pennzoil-Quaker State, inheriting the automobile parts and fluids division. The former was acquired by Oklahoma-based Devon Energy in 1999, while the latter was acquired by Royal Dutch Shell (today known as Shell plc).

=== UTLX, acquired by Berkshire Hathaway ===
Originally a competitor to Standard Oil, the Union Tank Car Company (UTLX) later was acquired by Rockefeller's conglomerate and returned to its status as an individual company during the breakup of Standard Oil. The company's growth was gradual but it eventually formed a Canadian affiliate, Procor, in 1952. It was around this time that UTLX formed and eventually spun off what would later become the credit bureau TransUnion.

In 1981, UTLX was acquired by Marmon Group, a conglomerate controlled by the Pritzker family which spun off TransUnion in 2005 to become an independent company. Three years later in 2008, Marmon and UTLX announced it was being acquired by Berkshire Hathaway, which remains the present owner of UTLX and Marmon.

=== Chesebrough Manufacturing, acquired by Unilever ===
Formed in 1872 and named for founder Robert Chesebrough, the Chesebrough Manufacturing Company was acquired by Standard Oil in 1881 and separated from Standard as one of the 39 successor entities during the 1911 divesture. With the split, Chesebrough lost its guaranteed supply of raw materials, and production temporarily halted in 1920; a similar issue halted production during the Second World War. The business divested many of its projects through the 1950s and eventually merged with Pond's in 1955.

In 1987, Unilever acquired Chesebrough for $3.1 billion USD, or $72.50 per share, in an all-cash deal, beating a $66/share offer from American Brands. Unilever to this day continues to produce Vaseline.

== List of Standard Oil descendants ==
Thirty-nine companies were created directly from Standard Oil by the ruling in U.S. v. Standard Oil Company of New Jersey, as listed in Section 4 of the court's judgement.

- Anglo-American Oil Company
- Atlantic Refining Company (Atlantic Petroleum, later ARCO, today part of Marathon Petroleum)
- Borne-Scrymser Company
- Buckeye Pipe Line Company (Buckeye Partners, today part of IFM Investors)
- Chesebrough Manufacturing Company (today part of Unilever)
- Colonial Oil Company
- Continental Oil Company, today ConocoPhillips and Phillips 66
- Crescent Pipe Line Company
- Eureka Pipe Line Company
- Galena-Signal Oil Company
- Indiana Pipe Line Company
- Lawrence Natural Gas Company
- Mahoning Gas Fuel Company
- Mountain State Gas Company
- National Transit Company
- New York Transit Company
- Northern Pipe Line Company
- Northwestern Ohio Natural Gas Company
- The Ohio Oil Company, today Marathon Oil and Marathon Petroleum
- People's Natural Gas Company
- Pittsburg Natural Gas Company
- Solar Refining Company
- Southern Pipe Line Company
- South Penn Oil Company, later Pennzoil, today part of Shell plc
- Southwest Pennsylvania Pipe Lines
- Standard Oil of California (SoCal or CalSo, today known as Chevron)
- Standard Oil of Indiana (Amoco, today part of BP)
- Standard Oil of Iowa
- Standard Oil of Kansas
- Standard Oil of Kentucky (Kyso, today part of Chevron)
- Standard Oil of Nebraska
- Standard Oil of New Jersey (Esso, later Exxon, today ExxonMobil)
- Standard Oil of New York (Socony, later Mobil, today part of ExxonMobil)
- Standard Oil of Ohio (Sohio), today part of BP
- Swan and Finch Company
- Union Tank Line Company, today part of Berkshire Hathaway
- Vacuum Oil Company, today part of ExxonMobil
- Washington Oil Company
- Waters-Pierce Oil Company - became part of Sinclair Oil Corporation in 1930

Five additional descendants were split from National Transit Company in the wake of U.S. v. Standard Oil Company of New Jersey, as listed in Section 4 of the court's judgement.

- Connecting Gas Company
- Cumberland Pipe Line Company
- East Ohio Gas Company
- Franklin Pipe Company
- Prairie Oil & Gas Company

There were approximately 6,000 stockholders of the Standard Oil Company of New Jersey, which was traded during the time of litigation (1907-1911) between $390 to $690. For each share of this stock, the holder was entitled to receive a fractional amount of par capital of the segregated subsidiaries (the shares of which were in possession of the Standard Oil of New Jersey), in addition to the shares of Jersey which they held (since the company continued to exist with all the assets besides the subsidiary shares that were distributed). At the time of the distribution of the stock, no steps had been taken to inform the public of the valuation of the various companies, which had not released corporate reports on their assets and earning power for years. The Standard Oil Company of Iowa, a distributor on the Pacific Coast, was listed as a co-defendant, but had sold all its properties to the Standard Oil (Cal.) in October 1906 and was no longer in existence at the end of the trial. The other co-defendants who were not affected were

- Connecting Gas Co
- East Ohio Gas Co
- Franklin Pipe Company Ltd
- Lawrence Natural Gas Co
- Mahoning Gas Fuel Co
- Mountain State Gas Co
- Northwestern Ohio Natural Gas Co
- People's Natural Gas Co
- Pittsburg Natural Gas Co

The stocks of 33 companies were distributed. Together with Standard of New Jersey this made 34 companies formerly under unified control independent again, albeit all initially owned by the former Standard Oil stockholders in the exact same proportions.

There were 983,383 shares of Standard (New Jersey) outstanding at the cutoff date.

Capital of companies segregated from Standard Oil
Company	Capital	Par	Held by Standard Oil of NJ	per S.O. share
Anglo-American Oil Co	£1,000,000	£1	£983,383	£1.00
Atlantic Refining Co	$5,000,000	$100	$4,999,600	$5.08
Borne-Scrymser Co	$200,000	$100	$199,500	$0.20
Buckeye Pipe Line Co	$10,000,000	$50	$9,999,700	$10.17
Cheseborough Mfg Co	$500,000	$100	$277,700	$0.28
Colonial Oil Co	$250,000	$100	$249,300	$0.25
Continental Oil Co	$300,000	$100	$299,500	$0.30
Crescent Pipe Line Co	$3,000,000	$50	$2,999,850	$3.05
Cumberland Pipe Line Co	$1,000,000	$100	$998,500	$1.02
Eureka Pipe Line Co	$5,000,000	$100	$4,999,400	$5.08
Galena Signal Oil Co (com)	$8,000,000	$100	$5,591,900	$5.69
Galena Signal Oil Co (pref)	$2,000,000	$100	1,687,500	$1.72
Indiana Pipe Line Co	$5,000,000	$100	$4,999,700	$5.08
National Transit Co	$12,727,575	$25	$12,725,825	$12.94
New York Transit Co	$5,000,000	$100	$4,999,400	$5.08
Northern Pipe Line Co	$4,000,000	$100	$3,999,400	$4.07
Ohio Oil Co	$15,000,000	$25	$14,999,850	$15.25
Prairie Oil & Gas Co	$18,000,000	$100	$17,997,400	$18.30
Solar Refining Co	$500,000	$100	$499,400	$0.51
Southern Pipe Line Co	$10,000,000	$100	$9,999,400	$10.17
South Penn Oil Co	$2,500,000	$100	$2,499,500	$2.54
Southwest Pennsylvania Pipe Line	$3,500,000	$100	$3,499,600	$3.56
Standard Oil (Cal.)	$25,000,000	$100	$24,999,500	$25.42
Standard Oil (Ind.)	$1,000,000	$100	$999,000	$1.02
Standard Oil (Kan.)	$1,000,000	$100	$999,300	$1.02
Standard Oil (Ky.)	$1,000,000	$100	$997,200	$1.01
Standard Oil (Neb.)	$1,000,000	$100	$599,500	$0.61
Standard Oil (NY)	$15,000,000	$100	$14,999,600	$15.25
Standard Oil (Ohio)	$3,500,000	$100	$3,499,400	$3.56
Swan & Finch Co	$100,000	$100	$99,400	$0.10
Union Tank Line Co	$15,000,000	$100	$11,999,300	$12.20
Vacuum Oil Co	$2,500,000	$100	$2,499,800	$2.54
Washington Oil Co	$100,000	$10	$71,430	$0.07
Waters-Pierce Oil Co	$400,000	$100	$274,700	$0.28
