= Mini-tender offer =

A mini-tender offer is an offer to acquire a company's shares directly from current investors in an amount less than 5% of issued stock. In the United States, the advantage is that it does not required all the disclosures required for larger tender offers and the relevant filings with the U.S. Securities and Exchange Commission though they remain subject to the anti-fraud provisions. This saves a lot of time and effort for the buyer and seller of the shares but increases the risks for the buyer as they do not have all the relevant disclosure that would normally be provided in a full tender offer.

== Reduced SEC Regulations ==
An offer to purchase less than 5% of the company's securities is not governed by Section 14(d) of the Securities Exchange Act or Regulation 14D and is not required to be filed on a Schedule TO with the U.S. Securities and Exchange Commission. Thus, mini-tenders do not have to make all the disclosures required for larger tender offers, though they remain subject to the anti-fraud provisions of the Securities Exchange Act that state that it is illegal "to make any untrue statement of a material fact or omit to state any material fact necessary in order to make the statements made, in the light of the circumstances under which they are made, not misleading, or to engage in any fraudulent, deceptive, or manipulative acts or practices, in connection with any tender offer."

The SEC advises extreme caution, so an investor should carefully read the mini-tender disclosures and check any market prices with his or her broker. Many mini-tender offers are made with respect to companies that do not trade on an established market. Furthermore, some mini-tender offers are irrevocable once signed, whereas registered tender offers must allows investors to change their minds up until the offer period expires.

The back office systems of many broker-dealers do not distinguish between mini-tenders and SEC-registered tender offers. A mini-tender is never labeled as a "mini-tender." It has been reported that investors assume that mini-tenders have the same protections as larger tenders, simply because both types of offers are presented as a solicitation on the broker's letterhead.

Some mini-tenders are exchange offers, in which one security is exchanged for another. If the investor tenders publicly traded shares in return for shares with no liquid market, they will receive securities that they cannot readily sell.

== Rationale ==
Most mini-tenders are made below the value of the security. In some cases, the bidder may be able to turn around and sell the acquired shares at market for a profit. In other cases, the mini-tenders may be for securities that do not have an established market, in which case the purchaser may profit sometime in the future if distributions from such securities exceed the purchase price (or, may lose money if the purchaser was wrong in estimating the security's underlying value). In contrast, traditional tender offers launched with the goal of taking over a company are registered with the SEC and usually offer a substantial premium to market value.

Some deceptive mini-tenders have been made at a small premium to the market, but remain open for weeks or months, locking in the investors' tendered shares. Such bidders are gambling that the market price will eventually rise above the initial bid premium, so they can profit while investors lose out (despite initially believing that they tendered at a premium). However, the bidder must purchase the shares according to the terms of the offer regardless of whether market price has risen, so the bidder may end up losing that gamble.

However, if the offer terms allow, the bidder can continually keep extending the expiration date to give the market price more time to rise above the offer. Thus, investors should read such offers to see if the bidder reserves the right to continually extend the offer. Many bidders provide that they may extend only one time for a limited period. As many mini-tenders do not offer withdrawal rights, the investor essentially loses control of his shares. Some have argued that the bidder is in a no-lose situation either way, if the market price never exceeds the offer price, the mini-tender will be withdrawn and the investors never get their premium. However, many would argue that if a bidder has the right to withdraw the offer, so must the investor, or the contract is illusory (see Illusory contract).

If the market price of the stock falls below the mini-tender price before the offer closes, the bidder can cancel the offer or reduce the offer price. While a price change allows investors to withdraw their shares, this process is not automatic. The onus is on the investor, as they (and not the bidder or broker) are responsible for acquiring the revised offer information and withdrawing their shares by the deadline.

A mini-tender offer may be structured on a first come, first purchase basis, where the bidder accepts shares in order of receipt. Consequently, investors may be pressured into believing that they are obligated to tender their shares before having solid information about the offer.

Mini-tenders often provide a market for investors to sell illiquid securities. Some have argued that this assertion is invalid because the bidder would have more difficulty selling the shares than individual investors, since they have a larger block of accumulated shares. While this is true if bidders are attempting to turn a quick profit, many bidders' strategies are to buy and hold the securities for the long-term.

== Example ==
The practice is frequently associated with a company called TRC Capital, a private firm founded by a Canadian securities lawyer.

MacKenzie Capital Management, LP, based in Moraga, California, also conducts hundreds of mini-tender offers and SEC registered tender offers each year, but for illiquid limited partnerships, real estate investment trusts, and other securities, ones not traded on a national exchange.

The boards of target companies such as Adobe Systems, Fastenal, MetLife, AMD, Ford, and Kimberly-Clark, Nvidia, J&J and Novo have attempted to counter mini-tenders by issuing recommendations to reject such offers.
