= 13D Research =

Institutional global research firm

- Knowledge is a competitive advantage and we want to share it.
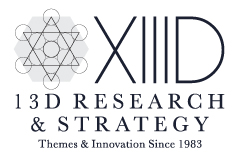
- Founded: 1983
- Key people: Kiril Sokoloff, Chairman & CEO
- Publication types: What I Learned This Week ©, What Are The Markets Telling Us? ©
- No. of employees: 50

13D Research is an independent institutional global research firm founded by Kiril Sokoloff in 1983. The company derives its name from Schedule 13D, an SEC form dthat must be submitted to the US Securities and Exchange Commission within 10 days, by anyone who acquires beneficial ownership of more than 5% of any class of publicly traded securities in a public company.

13D research publishes English-language and Mandarin Chinese international weekly newsletters and is headquartered in St. Thomas, US Virgin Islands.

== Publications ==
What I Learned This Week (WILTW) is 13D Research's flagship publication. WILTW began as an English-language international weekly newsletter in 2001, although today the newsletter is also published in Mandarin Chinese. The newsletter developed a global following of institutional investors, political leaders, and corporate executives. The publication covers a wide range of investing themes, including commodities, currencies, central bank policies, technology, demographics, political and social trends, energy markets, food security, credit markets, cyber security, climate change, and country-specific analyses of China, Japan, India, et al. It also covers a breadth of topics outside of the financial sector, such as literature, history, and personal health.

13D Research also publishes What Are The Markets Telling Us? © (WATMTU), a weekly compilation of chart analysis focused on intermediate- and long-term market trends.
