= Standard Oil of Iowa =

- Type: Subsidiary
- Industry: Energy industry
- Founded: 1885
- Founder: John D. Rockefeller
- Defunct: 1906
- Fate: dissolved
- Parent: Standard Oil (1885-1906)

Standard Oil Company of Iowa was created in 1885 as a subsidiary of the Standard Oil Trust to handle marketing along the Pacific Coast states of Idaho, Oregon, Washington, California, and Arizona. Though named for the midwestern state, it never included Iowa as one of its primary marketing areas. A prior company named Standard Oil of California had been formed in 1877, and was not associated with the Standard Oil Trust. In 1906, Standard Oil of Iowa was dissolved, and its assets handed over to a new Standard Oil of California, later Chevron Oil Company, and now the Chevron Corporation. Standard Oil Company of Iowa is thus the original company that is now Chevron.
