= Kyso =

Petroleum company

Standard Oil of Kentucky
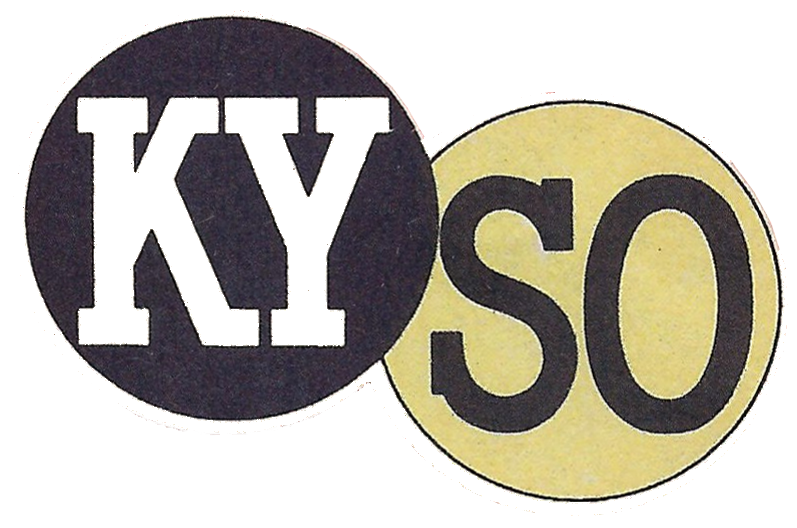
- Type: Private
- Industry: Petroleum
- Predecessor: Standard Oil
- Founded: 1886
- Defunct: 1961; 65 years ago
- Fate: Acquired by Chevron Corporation in 1961
- Successor: Chevron Corporation
- Headquarters: Kentucky, United States
- Area served: United States
- Products: Gasoline

Kyso (officially the Standard Oil Company of Kentucky) was an oil company, gasoline distributor, and direct descendant of Standard Oil that operated in the southeastern United States from 1886 until it was acquired by Standard Oil of California (today known as Chevron Corporation) in 1961. After the breakup of Standard Oil in 1911, the company was awarded rights to run the oil operation of Kentucky, Georgia, Florida, Alabama, and Mississippi.

== History ==
=== Formation and early years ===
The Standard Oil Company of Kentucky was incorporated on October 8, 1886, under Kentucky laws. It was founded as a division of the Standard Oil Trust to handle the assets of the Chess, Carley & Company, which Standard had acquired to handle product marketing and distribution for the southeastern U.S. It maintained corporate offices in all of the states it serviced, and also owned an oil refinery in Louisville, Kentucky, with a 500,000 barrel/year capacity. In 1892, it acquired the properties of Consolidated Tank Line Company.

=== Breakup of Standard Oil ===
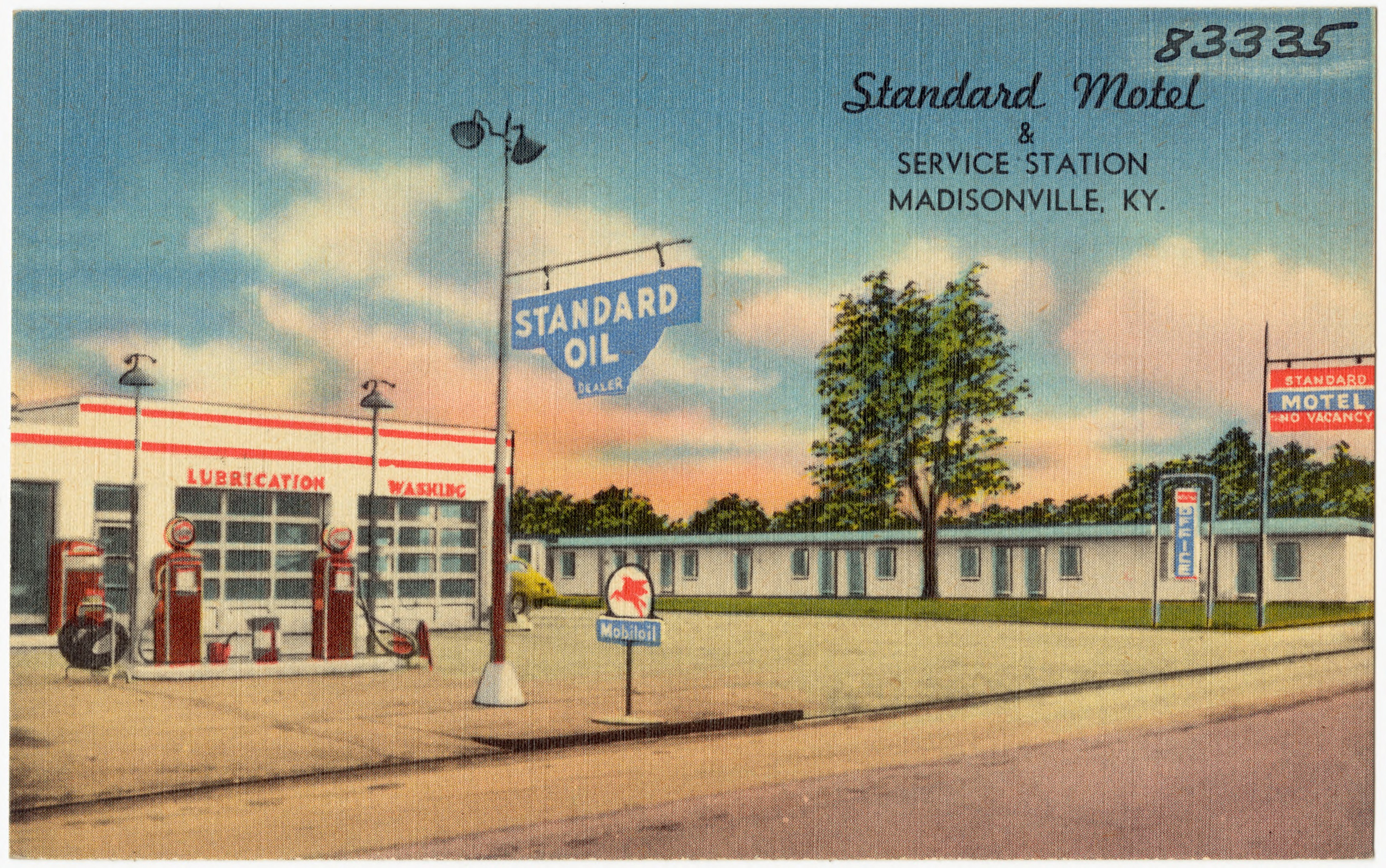
Postcard depicting Standard Motel and Standard service station in Madisonville, KY, c. 1930–45

When the monopoly was broken up as an illegal trust in the US Supreme Court case Standard Oil Co. of New Jersey v. United States in 1911, Kyso was spun off to market to the states of Kentucky, Georgia, Florida, Alabama, and Mississippi. As was common at the time, though no longer controlled by a single entity, the various "Baby Standards" still continued to cooperate. For example, Kyso was supplied by fellow "Baby Standard" Standard Oil of New Jersey, better known as Esso. The company avoided the consolidation prevalent in the industry throughout the first half of the century, and continued to sell various Esso and Mobil products. In 1930, it acquired the assets of Reed Oil Corp. of Atlanta, Georgia. The Riverside Refinery, built by Kyso circa 1918 in West Louisville, Kentucky, is still the source of considerable study due to environmental concerns.

Harland Sanders, founder of Kentucky Fried Chicken, started his first restaurant, the Sanders Court and Cafe, as part of a Standard Oil station in Corbin, Kentucky, in 1930.

=== Acquisition by Standard Oil of California ===
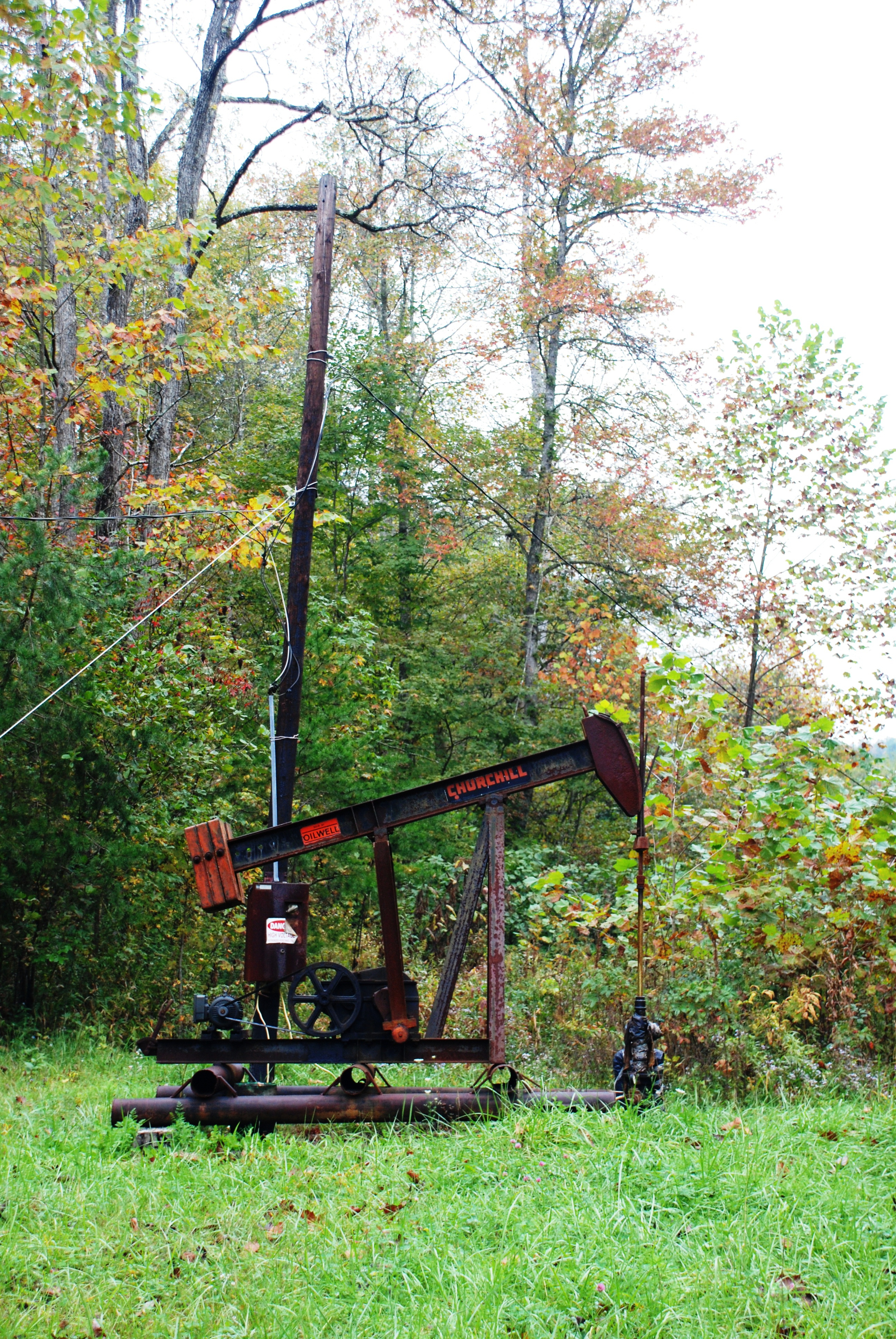
A Churchill balance-beam pumpjack at Pendergrass-Murray Recreational Preserve around Red River Gorge

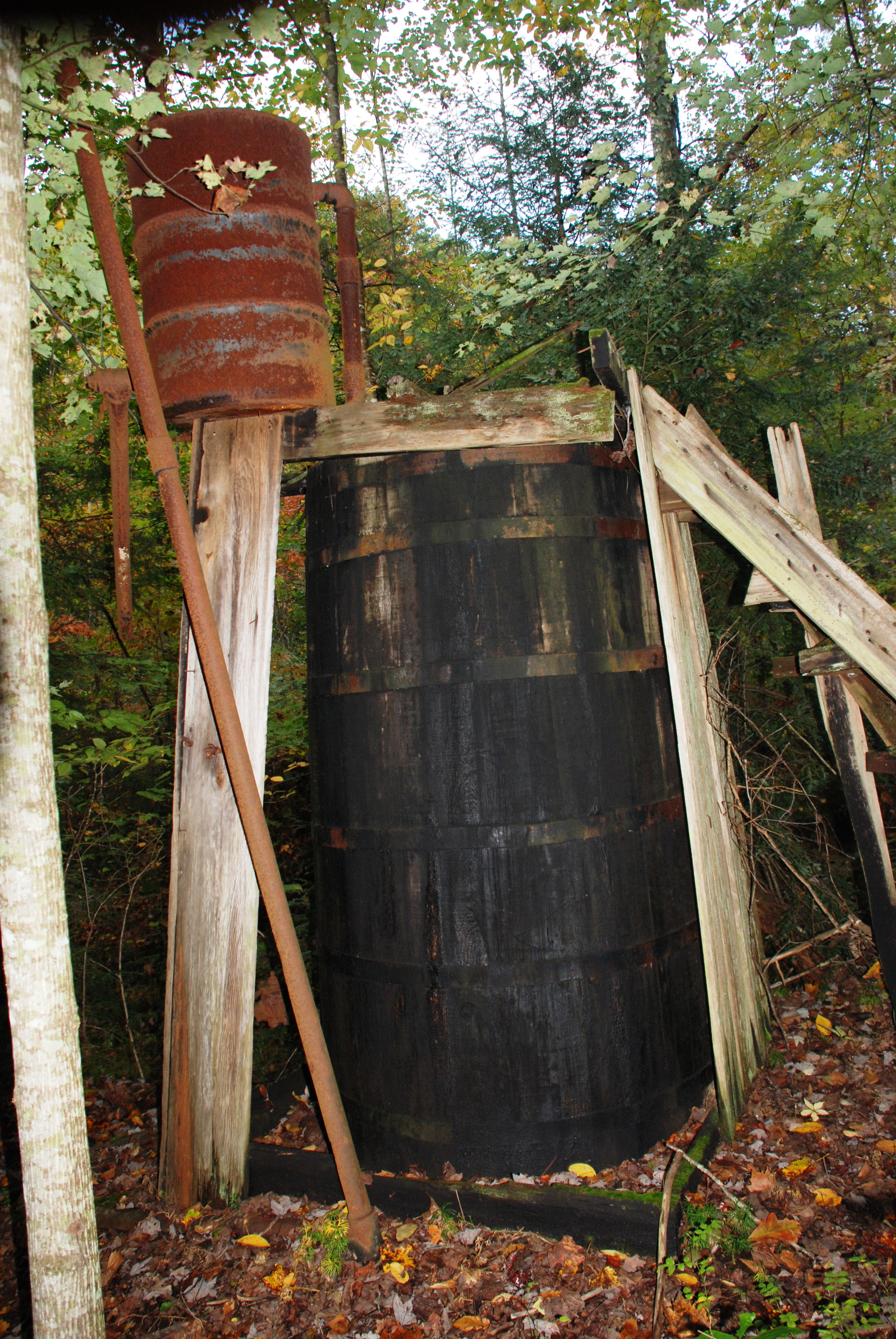
Pumpjack and wooden oil barrel in the forest is a reminder of the long history of oil industry in Kentucky

In 1961, Kyso was acquired by Standard Oil of California, effectively pushing Esso out of the former Kyso territory. Esso began marketing itself across the region as the "official" Standard brand oil. In 1966, Chevron sued over the use of Standard, and won, forcing Esso to rebrand itself as Enco over the former Kyso territory. During and after the merger, Kyso constructed the Pascagoula Refinery in Pascagoula, Mississippi, which began operations in 1963, and was still in operation as of 2006. In 1984, Standard Oil of California merged with Gulf Oil and renamed itself to Chevron; the newly formed company changed over all of the former Kyso stations to the Chevron logo while retaining the Standard brand name. It still maintains some Standard-branded stations in all of its former territories, including the former Kyso states, in order to protect its use of the brand in those areas. Following the acquisition by Chevron, the "Kyso" name fell out of use.

In 2010, Chevron discontinued its retailing operations in Kentucky, leaving ownership of the Standard trademark in Kentucky in limbo. Ironically, in 2016 ExxonMobil (the former Standard Oil of New Jersey, which had merged with Mobil in 1999 and still has stations in Kentucky to this day) was allowed to resume using the Esso trademark nationwide and thus the Esso logo returned to minor station signage at all Exxon and Mobil stations, effectively giving ExxonMobil de facto rights to the Standard name in Kentucky, though they are still owned by Chevron. Neither Chevron nor BP (which acquired Standard Oil of Ohio and Amoco and thus gained Standard trademarks) objected to the ruling.

== Bibliography ==
- The History of The Standard Oil Company, 1904 book by Ida M. Tarbell on PageTutor.com
