= Exchange offer =

In finance, corporate law and securities law, an exchange offer is a form of tender offer in which securities are offered as consideration instead of cash.

In a bond exchange offer, bondholders may consensually exchange their existing bonds for another class of debt or equity securities. Companies may often seek to exchange their securities to extend maturities, reduce debt outstanding or convert debt into equity.

== See also ==
- Funding
- Tender offer
