= Standard Oil =

American oil company (1870–1911)

Standard Oil Company

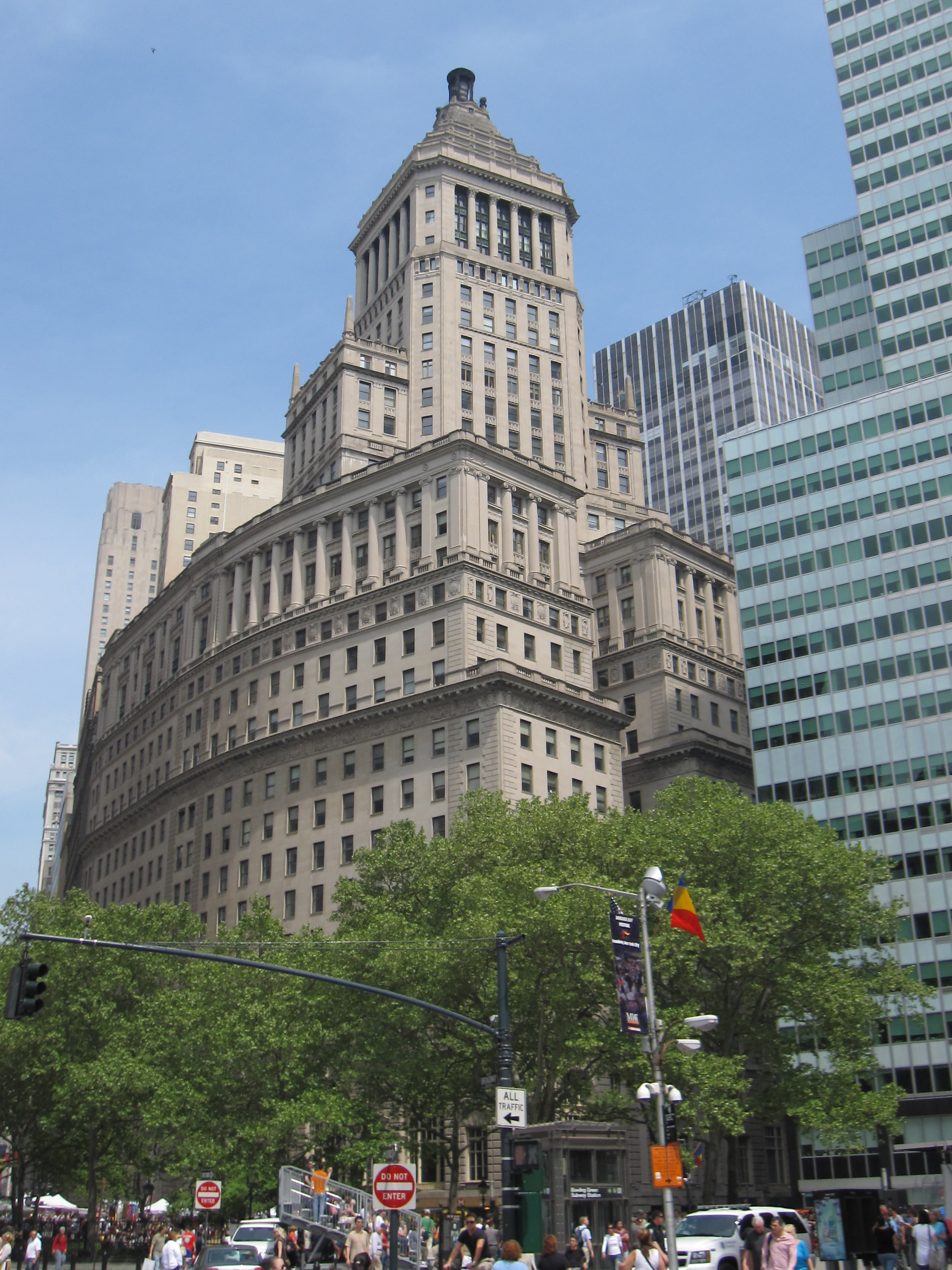
- Standard Oil's former headquarters at 26 Broadway in Manhattan
- Type: Business trust (1882–1892); New Jersey Holding Company (1899–1911)
- Industry: Oil and gas
- Founded: January 2, 1882
- Founders: John D. Rockefeller; Stephen V. Harkness; Henry M. Flagler; William A. Rockefeller; Samuel Andrews
- Defunct: 1911; 115 years ago
- Fate: Split into 39 different companies; Standard Oil of New Jersey (then the controlling entity) later became ExxonMobil
- Successor: 39 successor entities
- Headquarters: Cleveland, Ohio (1870–1885); New York City, New York (1885–1911)
- Key people: John D. Archbold, Vice President; Charles Pratt, Senior Executive; Henry H. Rogers, Senior Executive; Oliver H. Payne, Senior Executive; Daniel O'Day, Senior Executive; Jabez A. Bostwick, Senior Executive & First Treasurer; William G. Warden, Senior Executive; Jacob Vandergrift, Senior Executive
- Products: Fuel; lubricant; petrochemicals
- Number of employees: 60,000 (1909)

Standard Oil Company was a corporate trust in the petroleum industry that existed from 1882 to 1911. The origins of the trust lay in the operations of the Standard Oil Company (Ohio), which was founded in 1870 by John D. Rockefeller. The trust was born on January 2, 1882, when a group of 41 investors signed the Standard Oil Trust Agreement which pooled their securities of 40 companies into a single holding agency managed by nine trustees. The original trust was valued at $70 million. On March 21, 1892, the Standard Oil Trust was dissolved by order of the Supreme Court of Ohio, and its holdings were reorganized into 20 independent companies that formed an unofficial union referred to as "Standard Oil Interests." In 1899, the Standard Oil Company of New Jersey (Jersey Standard) acquired the shares of the other 19 companies and became the holding company for the trust.

Jersey Standard operated a near monopoly in the American oil industry from 1899 until 1911 and was the largest corporation in the United States. In 1911, the landmark Supreme Court case Standard Oil Co. of New Jersey v. United States found Jersey Standard guilty of anticompetitive practices and ordered it to break up its holdings. The charge came about in part as a consequence of the reporting of Ida Tarbell, who wrote The History of the Standard Oil Company. The net value of companies severed from Jersey Standard in 1911 was $375 million, which constituted 57% of Jersey Standard's value. After dissolution, Jersey Standard became the United States' second largest corporation after United States Steel.

Jersey Standard, which was renamed Exxon in 1973 and ExxonMobil in 1999, remains one of the largest public oil companies in the world. Many of the companies that disassociated from Jersey Standard in 1911 remained powerful businesses through the 20th century and have since merged into other oil and gas companies; two of the largest include Chevron Corporation, the continuation of the Standard Oil Company of California, and BP, which while founded separately from Standard's lineage later acquired Standard Oil of Ohio and merged with Amoco (Standard Oil of Indiana).

== Founding and early years ==
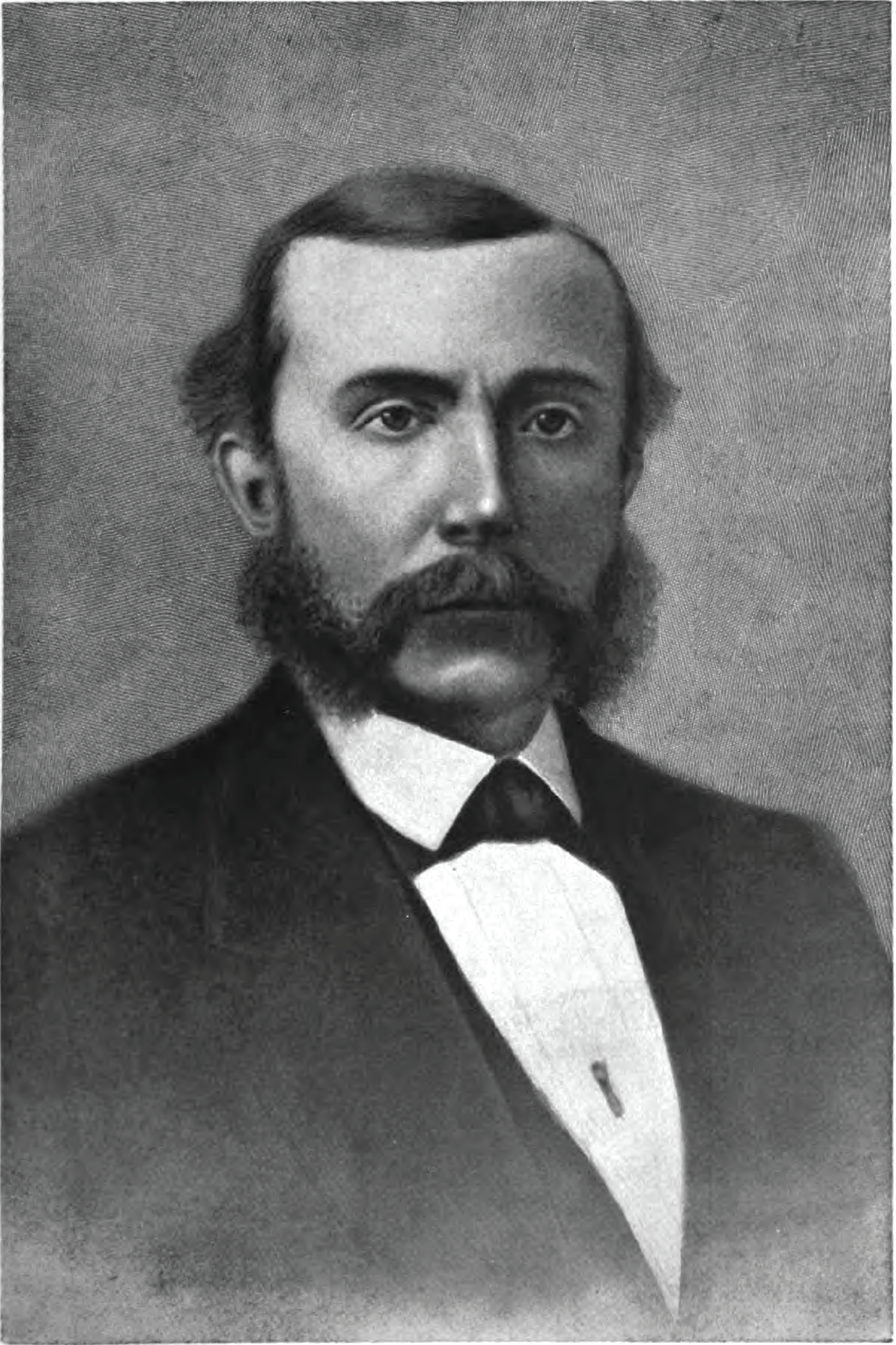
John D. Rockefeller c. 1872, shortly after founding Standard Oil

Standard Oil's prehistory began in 1863, as an Ohio partnership formed by industrialist John D. Rockefeller, his brother William Rockefeller, Henry Flagler, chemist Samuel Andrews, silent partner Stephen V. Harkness, and Oliver Burr Jennings, who had married the sister of William Rockefeller's wife. In 1870, Rockefeller abolished the partnership and incorporated Standard Oil in Ohio. The company was established with $1 million in capital. Of the initial 10,000 shares, John D. Rockefeller received 2,667, Harkness received 1,334, William Rockefeller, Flagler, and Andrews received 1,333 each, Jennings received 1,000, and the firm of Rockefeller, Andrews & Flagler received 1,000. Rockefeller chose the "Standard Oil" name as a symbol of the reliable "standards" of quality and service that he envisioned for the nascent oil industry.

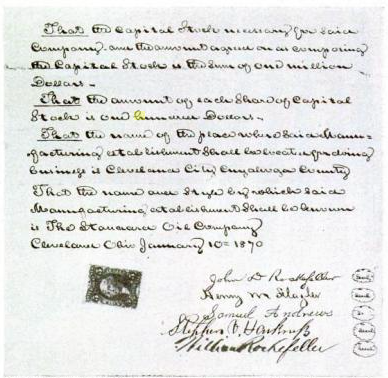
Standard Oil Articles of Incorporation signed by John D. Rockefeller, Henry M. Flagler, Samuel Andrews, Stephen V. Harkness, and William Rockefeller, 1870

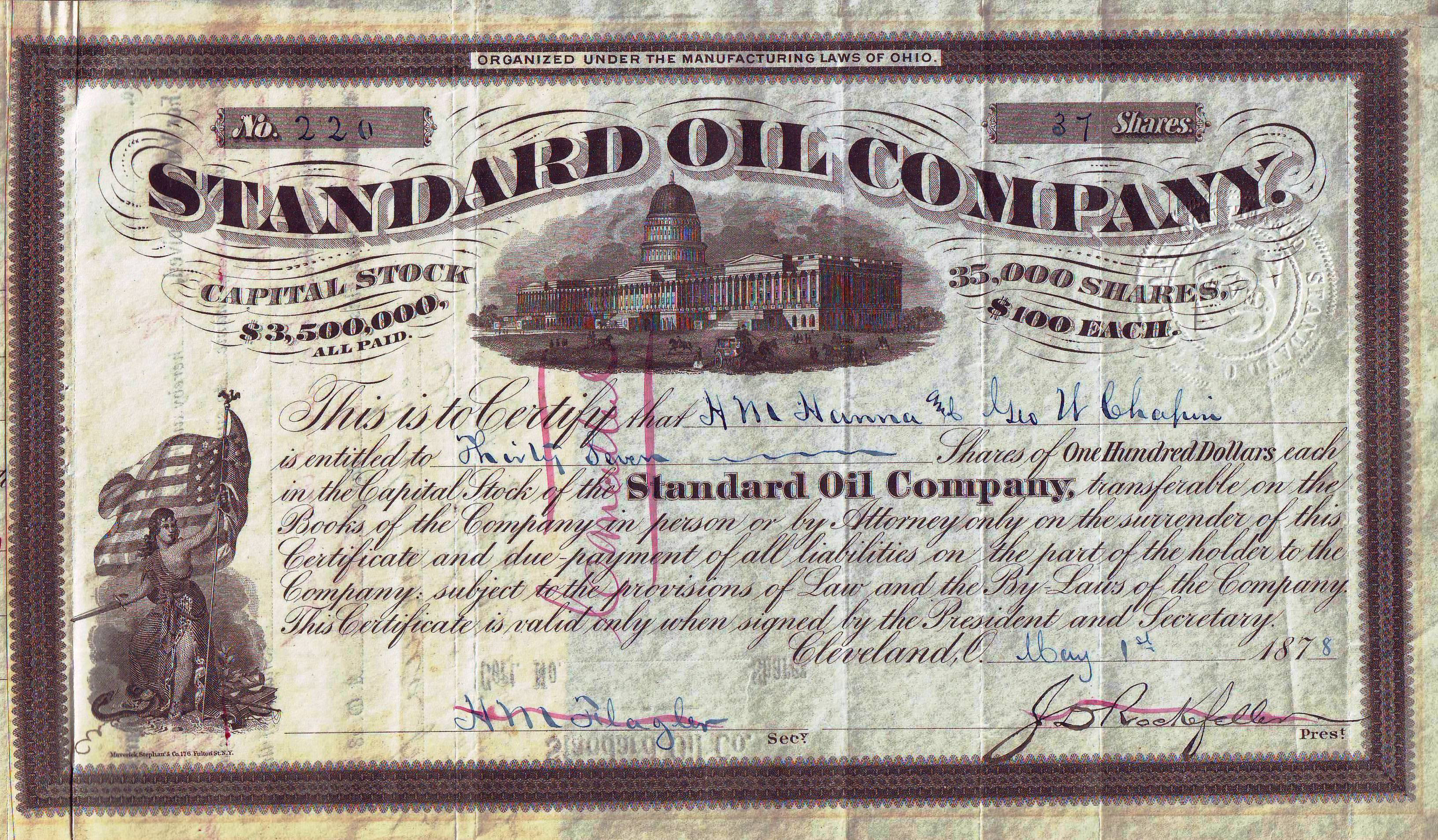
Share of the Standard Oil, issued May 1, 1878

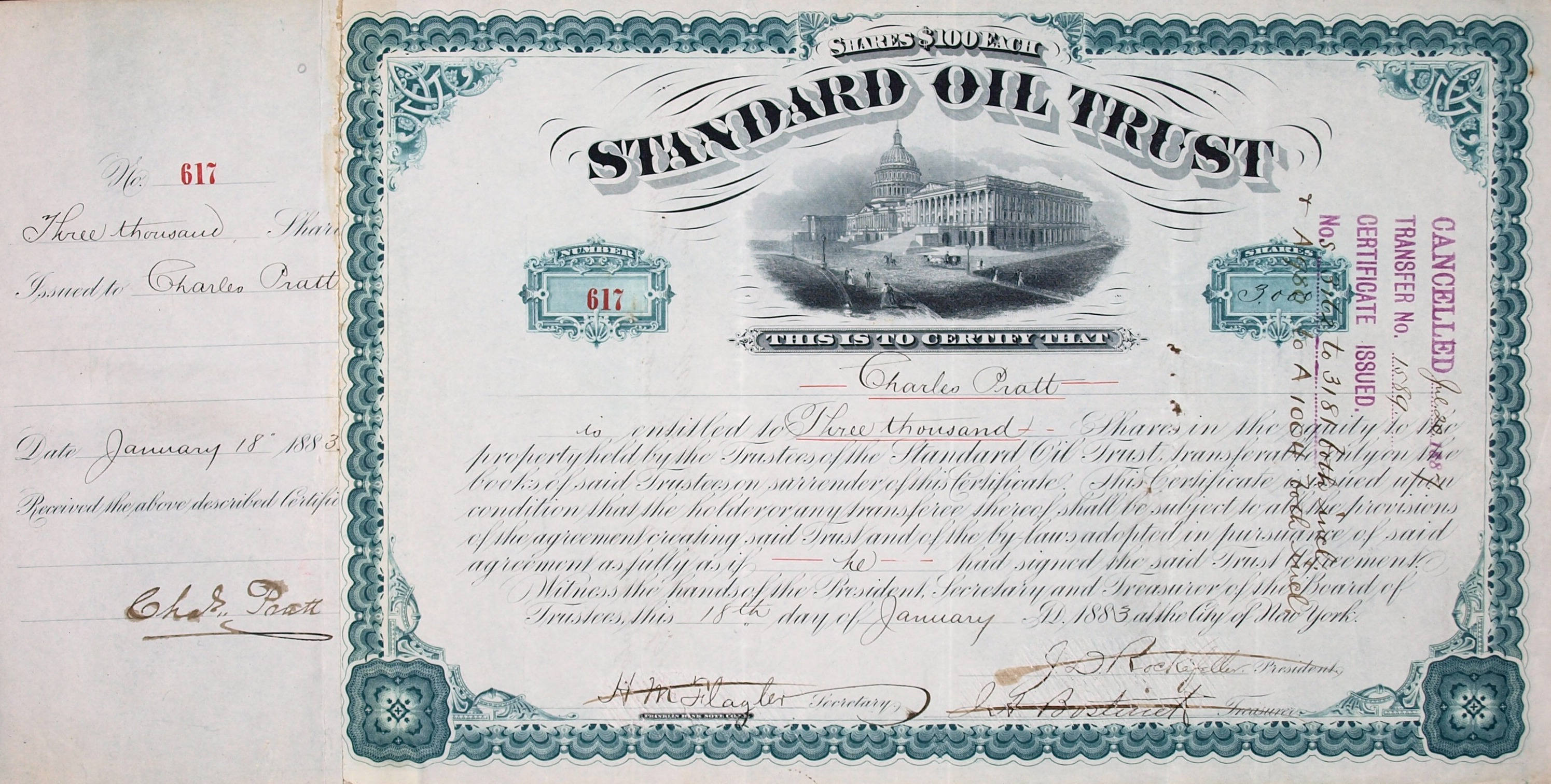
Share of the Standard Oil Trust, issued January 18, 1883

In the early years, John D. Rockefeller dominated the combine; he was the single most important figure in shaping the oil industry. He quickly distributed power and the tasks of policy formation to a system of committees but always remained the largest shareholder. Authority was centralized in the company's main office in Cleveland, but decisions in the office were made cooperatively.

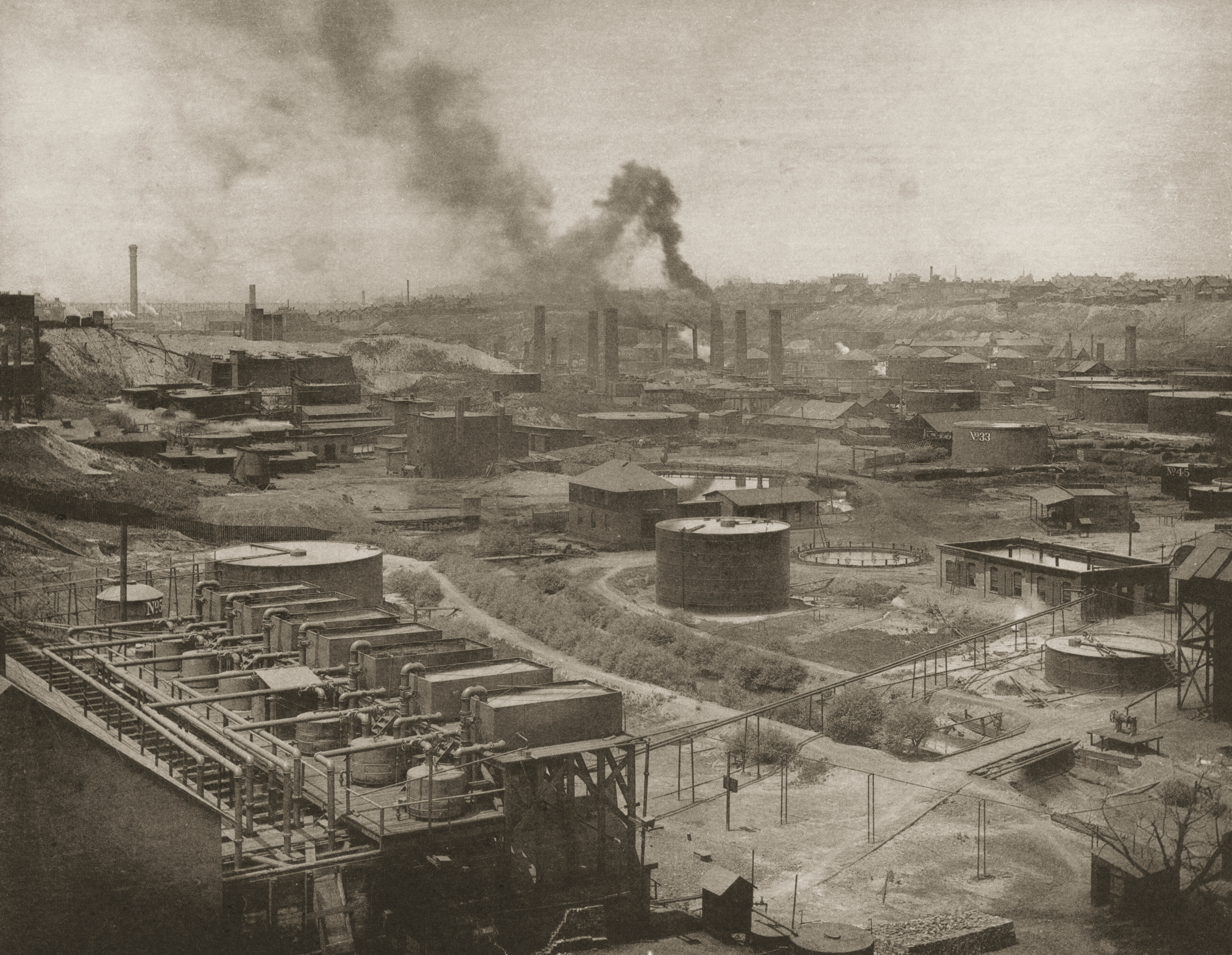
Standard Oil Refinery No. 1 in Cleveland, Ohio, 1897

The company grew by increasing sales and through acquisitions. After purchasing competing firms, Rockefeller shut down those he believed to be inefficient and kept the others. In a seminal deal in 1868, the Lake Shore Railroad, a part of the New York Central Railroad, gave Rockefeller's firm a going rate of one cent per gallon or 42 cents per barrel—an effective 71% discount from its listed rates—in return for a promise to ship at least 60 carloads of oil daily and to handle loading and unloading on its own. Smaller companies decried such deals as unfair because they were not producing enough oil to qualify for discounts.

Standard's actions and secret transport deals helped its kerosene price to drop from 58 to 26 cents from 1865 to 1870. Rockefeller used the Erie Canal as a cheap alternative form of transportation—in the summer months when it was not frozen—to ship his refined oil from Cleveland to the industrialized Northeast. In the winter months, his options were the three trunk lines—the Erie Railroad and the New York Central Railroad to New York City, and the Pennsylvania Railroad to Pittsburgh and Philadelphia.

Competitors disliked the company's business practices, but consumers liked the lower prices. Standard Oil, being formed well before the discovery of the Spindletop oil field (in Texas, far from Standard Oil's base in the Midwest) and a demand for oil other than for heat and light, was well placed to control the growth of the oil business. The company was perceived to own and control all aspects of the trade.

=== South Improvement Company ===
In 1872, Rockefeller joined the South Improvement Company which would have allowed him to receive rebates for shipping and drawbacks on oil his competitors shipped. He successfully convinced refineries in Cleveland to sell their businesses to Standard Oil in exchange for cash or stock. But when this deal became known, competitors convinced the Pennsylvania Legislature to revoke South Improvement's charter. No oil was shipped under this arrangement. Using highly effective tactics, later widely criticized, it absorbed or destroyed most of its competition in Cleveland in less than two months and later throughout the northeastern United States.

=== Hepburn Committee ===
A. Barton Hepburn was directed by the New York State Legislature in 1879 to investigate the railroads' practice of giving rebates to their largest clients within the state. Merchants without ties to the oil industry had pressed for the hearings. Prior to the committee's investigation, few knew of the size of Standard Oil's control and influence on seemingly unaffiliated oil refineries and pipelines—Hawke (1980) cites that only a dozen or so within Standard Oil knew the extent of company operations.

The committee counsel, Simon Sterne, questioned representatives from the Erie Railroad and the New York Central Railroad and discovered that at least half of their long-haul traffic granted rebates and much of this traffic came from Standard Oil. Even independent companies not allied with Standard Oil confirmed receiving these rebates such as Simon Bernheimner, who was once a partner of the Olefin Oil Company. The committee then shifted its focus to Standard Oil's operations. Acme Oil Company president John Dustin Archbold denied that Acme was associated with Standard Oil; he then admitted to being a director of Standard Oil.

The committee's final report scolded the railroads for their rebate policies and cited Standard Oil as an example. This scolding was largely moot to Standard Oil's interests since long-distance oil pipelines had become their preferred method of transportation.

=== Standard Oil Trust ===
In response to state laws that had the result of limiting the scale of companies, Rockefeller and his associates developed innovative ways of organizing to effectively manage their fast-growing enterprise. On January 2, 1882, they combined their disparate companies, spread across dozens of states, under a single group of trustees. By a secret agreement, the existing 37 stockholders conveyed their shares "in trust" to nine trustees: John and William Rockefeller, Oliver H. Payne, Charles Pratt, Henry Flagler, John D. Archbold, William G. Warden, Jabez Bostwick, and Benjamin Brewster.

"Whereas some state legislatures imposed special taxes on out-of-state corporations doing business in their states, other legislatures forbade corporations in their state from holding the stock of companies based elsewhere. (Legislators established such restrictions in the hope that they would force successful companies to incorporate—and thus pay taxes—in their state.)" Standard Oil's organizational concept proved so successful that other giant enterprises adopted this "trust" form.

By 1882, Rockefeller's top aide was Archbold, whom he left in control after disengaging from business to concentrate on philanthropy after 1896. Other notable principals of the company include Flagler (developer of the Florida East Coast Railway and resort cities) and Henry H. Rogers, who built the Virginian Railway.

In 1885, Standard Oil of Ohio moved its headquarters from Cleveland to its permanent headquarters at 26 Broadway in New York City. Concurrently, the trustees of Standard Oil Company of Ohio chartered the Standard Oil Co. of New Jersey to take advantage of New Jersey's more lenient corporate stock ownership laws.

=== Sherman Antitrust Act of 1890 ===
In 1890, Congress overwhelmingly passed the Sherman Antitrust Act (Senate 51–1; House 242–0), a source of American anti-monopoly laws. The law forbade every contract, scheme, deal, or conspiracy to restrain trade, though the phrase "restraint of trade" remained subjective. The Standard Oil group quickly attracted attention from antitrust authorities leading to a lawsuit filed by Ohio Attorney General David K. Watson.

=== Earnings and dividends ===
From 1882 to 1906, Standard paid out $548,436,000 (equivalent to $1.47063×10^{10} in 2025) in dividends at a 65.4% payout ratio. The total net earnings from 1882 to 1906 amounted to $838,783,800 (equivalent to $2.24920×10^{10} in 2025), exceeding the dividends by $290,347,800, which was used for plant expansions.

== 1895–1913 ==
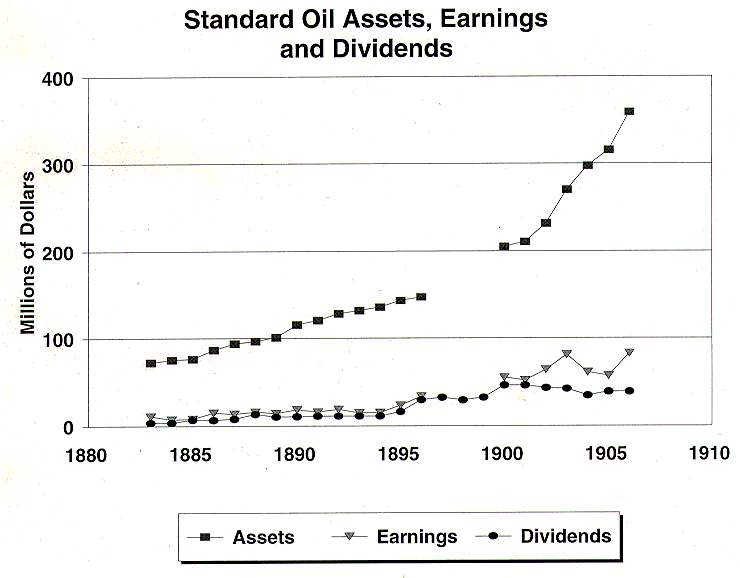
Financials

In 1896, John Rockefeller retired from the Standard Oil Co. of New Jersey, the holding company of the group, but remained president and a major shareholder. Vice-president Archbold took a large part in the running of the firm. In 1904 Standard Oil controlled 91% of oil refinement and 85% of final sales in the United States. State and federal laws sought to counter this development with antitrust laws. In 1911, the U.S. Justice Department sued the group under the federal antitrust law and ordered its breakup into 39 companies.

Standard Oil's market position was initially established through an emphasis on efficiency and responsibility. While most companies dumped gasoline in rivers (this was before the automobile was popular), Standard used it to fuel its machines. While other companies' refineries piled mountains of heavy waste, Rockefeller found ways to sell it. For example, Standard bought the company that invented and produced Vaseline, the Chesebrough Manufacturing Co., which was a Standard company from 1908 to 1911.

One of the original "Muckrakers," Ida M. Tarbell, was an American author and journalist whose father was an oil producer whose business had failed because of Rockefeller's business dealings. After extensive interviews with Rogers—a sympathetic senior executive of Standard Oil—Tarbell's investigations of Standard Oil fueled growing public attacks on Standard Oil and monopolies in general. Her work was published in 19 parts in McClure's magazine from November 1902 to October 1904, then in 1904 as the book The History of the Standard Oil Co.

The Standard Oil Trust was controlled by a small group of families. Rockefeller stated in 1910: "I think it is true that the Pratt family, the Payne–Whitney family (which were one, as all the stock came from Colonel Payne), the Harkness-Flagler family (which came into the company together) and the Rockefeller family controlled a majority of the stock during all the history of the company up to the present time." These families reinvested most of the dividends in other industries, especially railroads. They also invested heavily in the gas and the electric lighting business (including the giant Consolidated Gas Co. of New York City). They made large purchases of stock in U.S. Steel, Amalgamated Copper, and even Corn Products Refining Co.

=== China ===
Standard Oil's production increased so rapidly it soon exceeded U.S. demand, and the company began viewing export markets. In the 1890s, Standard Oil began marketing kerosene to China's large population of close to 400 million as lamp fuel. For its Chinese trademark and brand, Standard Oil adopted the name Mei Foo (Chinese: 美孚) as a transliteration. Mei Foo became the name of the tin lamp that Standard Oil produced and gave away or sold cheaply to Chinese farmers, encouraging them to switch from vegetable oil to kerosene. The response was positive, sales boomed, and China became Standard Oil's largest market in Asia.

The North China Department of Socony (Standard Oil Company of New York) operated a subsidiary called Socony River and Coastal Fleet, North Coast Division, which became the North China Division of Stanvac (Standard Vacuum Oil Company) after that company was formed in 1933. To distribute its products, Standard Oil constructed storage tanks, canneries (bulk oil from large ocean tankers was re-packaged into 5-US-gallon (19 L; 4.2 imp gal) tins), warehouses, and offices in key Chinese cities. For inland distribution the company had motor tank trucks and railway tank cars, and for river navigation it had a fleet of low-draft steamers and other vessels.

Stanvac's North China Division, based in Shanghai, owned hundreds of vessels, including motor barges, steamers, launches, tugboats, and tankers. Prior to World War II, Stanvac was the largest single U.S. investment in Southeast Asia. Up to 13 tankers operated on the Yangtze River, the largest of which were Mei Ping (1,118 gross register tons (GRT)), Mei Hsia (1,048 GRT), and Mei An (934 GRT). All three were destroyed in the 1937 USS Panay incident. Mei An was launched in 1901 and was the first vessel in the fleet. Other vessels included Mei Chuen, Mei Foo, Mei Hung, Mei Kiang, Mei Lu, Mei Tan, Mei Su, Mei Hsia, Mei Ying, and Mei Yun. Mei Hsia, a tanker, was specially designed for river duty. It was built by New Engineering and Shipbuilding Works of Shanghai, who also built the 500-ton launch Mei Foo in 1912.

Mei Hsia ("Beautiful Gorges") was launched in 1926 and carried 350 tons of bulk oil in three holds, plus a forward cargo hold, and space between decks for carrying general cargo or packed oil. She had a length of 206 feet (63 m), a beam of 32 feet (9.8 m), a depth of 10 feet 6 inches (3.2 m), and had a bulletproof wheelhouse. Mei Ping ("Beautiful Tranquility"), launched in 1927, was designed off-shore, but assembled and finished in Shanghai. Its oil-fuel burners came from the U.S. and water-tube boilers came from England.

=== Middle East ===
Standard Oil and Socony-Vacuum Oil Company became partners in providing markets for the oil reserves in the Middle East. In 1906, Socony (later Mobil) opened its first fuel terminals in Alexandria. It explored in Palestine before World War I broke out but ran into conflict with the local authorities.

=== Monopoly charges and antitrust legislation ===
By 1890, Standard Oil controlled 90% of the refined oil flowed in the United States. Ohio successfully sued Standard, compelling the dissolution of the trust in 1892. In response, Standard simply separated Standard Oil of Ohio and kept control of it. Eventually, the state of New Jersey changed its incorporation laws to allow a company to hold shares in other companies in any state. As a result, the Standard Oil Trust, based at 26 Broadway in New York, was legally reborn as a holding company in 1899: the Standard Oil Co. of New Jersey (SOCNJ). This company held stock in 41 others, which controlled other companies, which in turn controlled yet other companies. According to Daniel Yergin in his Pulitzer Prize-winning The Prize: The Epic Quest for Oil, Money, and Power (1990), this conglomerate was seen by the public as all-pervasive, controlled by a select group of directors, and completely unaccountable.

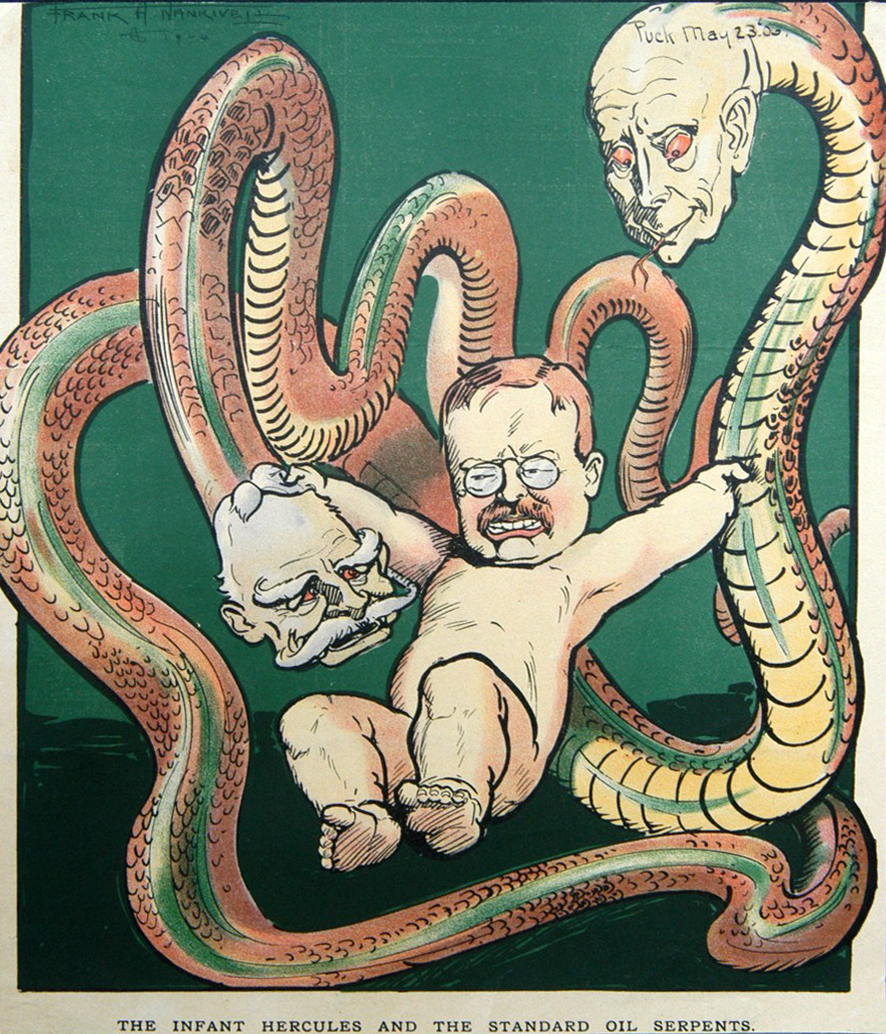
U.S. President Theodore Roosevelt depicted as the infant Hercules grappling with Standard Oil in a 1906 Puck magazine cartoon by Frank A. Nankivell

In 1904, Standard controlled 91% of production and 85% of final sales. Most of its output was kerosene, of which 55% was exported around the world. After 1900, it did not try to force competitors out of business by selling at a loss. The federal Commissioner of Corporations studied Standard's operations from the period of 1904 to 1906 and concluded that "beyond question ... the dominant position of the Standard Oil Co. in the refining industry was due to unfair practices—to abuse of the control of pipe-lines, to railroad discriminations, and to unfair methods of competition in the sale of the refined petroleum products".

Because of competition from other firms, their market share gradually eroded to 70% by 1906 which was the year when the antitrust case was filed against Standard. Standard's market share was 64% by 1911 when Standard was ordered broken up. At least 147 refining companies were competing with Standard including Gulf, Texaco, and Shell.

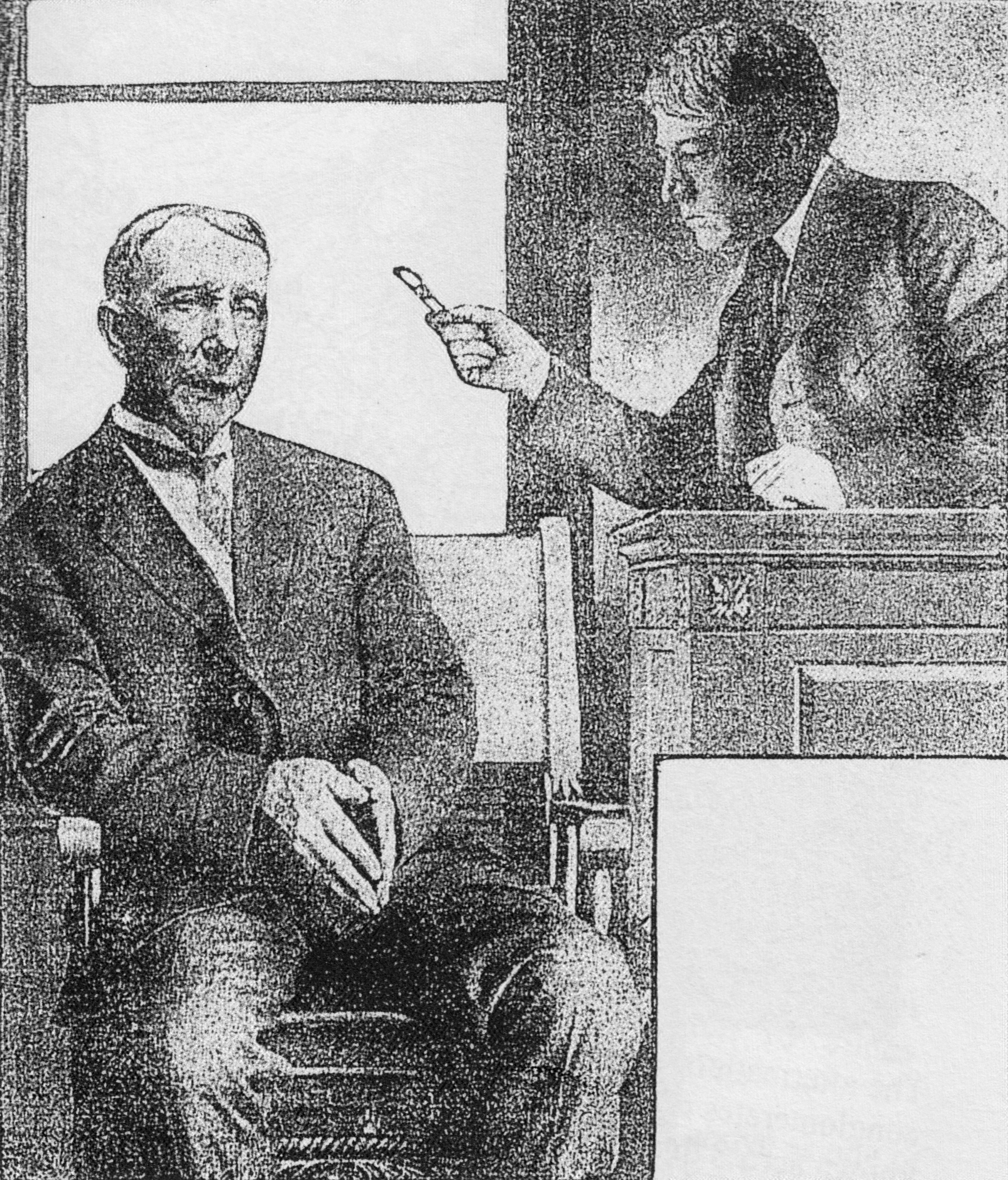
John D. Rockefeller sitting in the witness stand and testifying before Judge Kenesaw Mountain Landis, July 6, 1907

In 1909, the U.S. Justice Department sued Standard under federal antitrust law, the Sherman Antitrust Act of 1890, for sustaining a monopoly and restraining interstate commerce by:

Rebates, preferences, and other discriminatory practices in favor of the combination by railroad companies; restraint and monopolization by control of pipe lines, and unfair practices against competing pipe lines; contracts with competitors in restraint of trade; unfair methods of competition, such as local price cutting at the points where necessary to suppress competition; [and] espionage of the business of competitors, the operation of bogus independent companies, and payment of rebates on oil, with the like intent.

The lawsuit argued that Standard's monopolistic practices had taken place over the preceding four years:

The general result of the investigation has been to disclose the existence of numerous and flagrant discriminations by the railroads on behalf of the Standard Oil Co. and its affiliated corporations. With comparatively few exceptions, mainly of other large concerns in California, the Standard has been the sole beneficiary of such discriminations. In almost every section of the country that company has been found to enjoy some unfair advantages over its competitors, and some of these discriminations affect enormous areas.

Prosecutors identified four illegal patterns: (1) secret and semi-secret railroad rates; (2) discriminations in the open arrangement of rates; (3) discriminations in classification and rules of shipment; (4) discriminations in the treatment of private tank cars. The government alleged:

Almost everywhere the rates from the shipping points used exclusively, or almost exclusively, by the Standard are relatively lower than the rates from the shipping points of its competitors. Rates have been made low to let the Standard into markets, or they have been made high to keep its competitors out of markets. Trifling differences in distances are made an excuse for large differences in rates favorable to the Standard Oil Co., while large differences in distances are ignored where they are against the Standard. Sometimes connecting roads prorate on oil—that is, make through rates which are lower than the combination of local rates; sometimes they refuse to prorate; but in either case the result of their policy is to favor the Standard Oil Co. Different methods are used in different places and under different conditions, but the net result is that from Maine to California the general arrangement of open rates on petroleum oil is such as to give the Standard an unreasonable advantage over its competitors.

The government said that Standard raised prices to its monopolistic customers but lowered them to hurt competitors, often disguising its illegal actions by using bogus, supposedly independent companies it controlled.

The evidence is, in fact, absolutely conclusive that the Standard Oil Co. charges altogether excessive prices where it meets no competition, and particularly where there is little likelihood of competitors entering the field, and that, on the other hand, where competition is active, it frequently cuts prices to a point which leaves even the Standard little or no profit, and which more often leaves no profit to the competitor, whose costs are ordinarily somewhat higher.

On May 15, 1911, the US Supreme Court upheld the lower court judgment and declared the Standard Oil group to be an "unreasonable" monopoly under the Sherman Antitrust Act, Section II. It ordered Standard to break up into 39 independent companies with different boards of directors, the biggest two of the companies being Standard Oil of New Jersey (which became Exxon) and Standard Oil of New York (which became Mobil).

Standard president John D. Rockefeller had long since retired from any management role. But as he owned a quarter of the shares of the resultant companies, and those share values mostly doubled, he emerged from the dissolution as the richest man in the world. The dissolution had actually propelled Rockefeller's personal wealth.

== Breakup ==
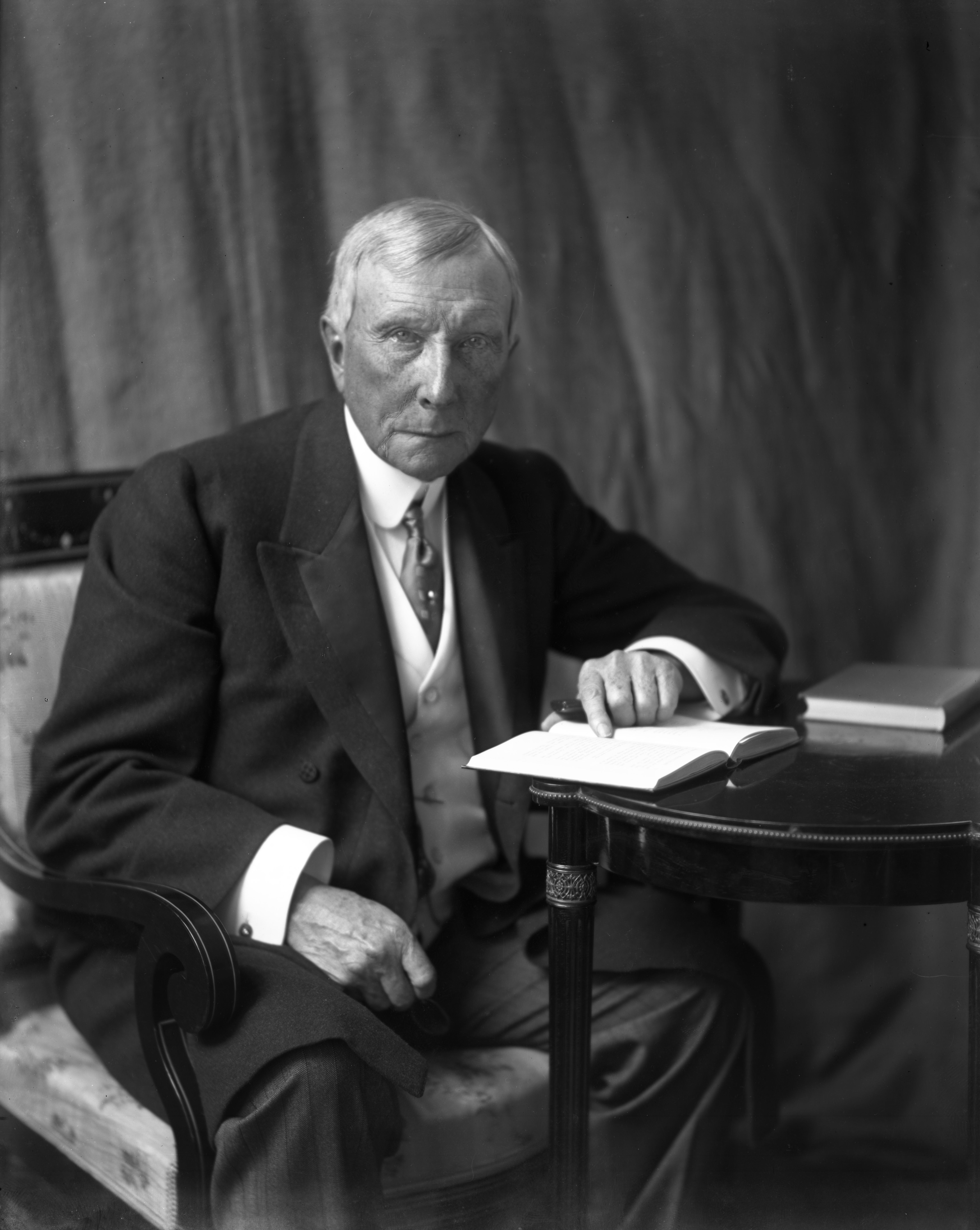
Rockefeller in 1911, shortly after the break up of Standard Oil

Abbreviated chart of some of Standard Oil's successors

Over the next few decades, Standard Oil of New Jersey and Standard Oil of New York grew significantly. Jersey Standard, led by Walter C. Teagle, became the largest oil producer in the world. It acquired a 50 percent share in Humble Oil & Refining Co., a Texas oil producer. Socony purchased a 45 percent interest in Magnolia Petroleum Co., a major refiner, marketer, and pipeline transporter. In 1931, Socony merged with Vacuum Oil Co., an industry pioneer dating back to 1866, and a growing Standard Oil spin-off in its own right.

In the Asia-Pacific region, Jersey Standard had oil production and refineries in the Dutch East Indies but no marketing network. Socony-Vacuum had Asian marketing outlets supplied remotely from California. In 1933, Jersey Standard and Socony-Vacuum merged their interests in the region into a 50–50 joint venture. Standard-Vacuum Oil Co., or "Stanvac", operated in 50 countries, from East Africa to New Zealand, before it was dissolved in 1962.

Rockefeller's original company, Standard Oil Company of Ohio (Sohio), effectively ceased to exist when it was purchased by BP in 1987. BP continued to sell gasoline under the Sohio brand until 1991. Other Standard oil entities include "Standard Oil of Indiana" which became Amoco after other mergers and a name change in the 1980s, and "Standard Oil of California" which became Chevron Corporation.

== Legacy and criticism of breakup ==
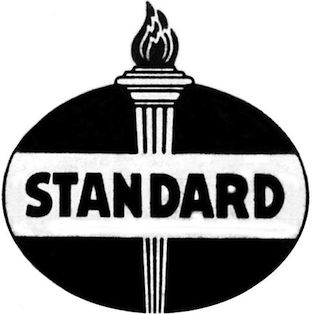
This logo used by Amoco (originally Standard Oil of Indiana, today a subsidiary of BP) is often affiliated with Standard Oil.

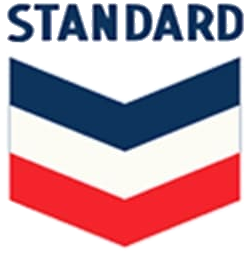
In the western United States, Standard Oil's successors used a chevron logo, paving the way for Standard Oil of California to rename itself to Chevron Corporation.

Some have speculated that if not for that court ruling, Standard Oil could have possibly been worth more than $1 trillion by the 2000s. Whether the breakup of Standard Oil was beneficial is a matter of some controversy. Some economists believe that Standard Oil was not a monopoly and argue that the intense free market competition resulted in cheaper oil prices and more diverse petroleum products. The Sherman Antitrust Act prohibits the restraint of trade. Defenders of Standard Oil insist that the company did not restrain trade; they were simply superior competitors. The federal courts ruled otherwise.

Critics claimed that success in meeting consumer needs was driving other companies who were not as successful out of the market. An example of this thinking was given in 1890, when Representative William Mason, arguing in favor of the Sherman Antitrust Act, said: "trusts have made products cheaper, have reduced prices; but if the price of oil, for instance, were reduced to one cent a barrel, it would not right the wrong done to people of this country by the trusts which have destroyed legitimate competition and driven honest men from legitimate business enterprise".

Some economic historians have observed that Standard Oil was in the process of losing its monopoly at the time of its breakup in 1911. Although Standard had 90 percent of American refining capacity in 1880, by 1911 that had shrunk to between 60 and 65 percent because of the expansion in capacity by competitors. Numerous regional competitors (such as Pure Oil in the East, Texaco and Gulf Oil in the Gulf Coast, Cities Service and Sun in the Midcontinent, Union in California, and Shell overseas) had organized themselves into competitive vertically integrated oil companies, the industry structure pioneered years earlier by Standard itself.

In addition, demand for petroleum products was increasing more rapidly than the ability of Standard to expand. The result was that although in 1911 Standard still controlled most production in the older regions of the Appalachian Basin (78 percent share, down from 92 percent in 1880), Lima-Indiana (90 percent, down from 95 percent in 1906), and the Illinois Basin (83 percent, down from 100 percent in 1906), its share was much lower in the rapidly expanding new regions that would dominate U.S. oil production in the 20th century. In 1911, Standard controlled only 44 percent of production in the midcontinent, 29 percent in California, and 10 percent on the Gulf Coast. Some analysts argue that the breakup was beneficial to consumers in the long run, and no one has proposed that Standard Oil be reassembled in pre-1911 form. ExxonMobil, however, does represent a substantial part of the original company.

Since the breakup of Standard Oil, several companies, such as General Motors and Microsoft, have come under antitrust investigation for being inherently too large for market competition; however, most of them remained together. The only company since the breakup of Standard Oil that was divided into parts like Standard Oil was AT&T, which after decades as a regulated natural monopoly, was forced to divest itself of the Bell System in 1984.

== Successor companies ==
Standard Oil's breakup split the company into 39 separate companies. Several of these companies were considered among the Seven Sisters who dominated the industry worldwide for much of the 20th century, and both Standard Oil's direct and indirect descendants make up Big Oil.

Today, Standard Oil's influence is primarily concentrated in a few companies:

- ExxonMobil, continuation of Standard Oil Company of New Jersey (later Exxon) which merged with Standard Oil Company of New York (later Mobil)
- Chevron, continuation of Standard Oil of California which acquired Kentucky Standard
- BP, continuation of the Anglo-Persian Oil Company which acquired Standard Oil of Ohio and Standard Oil of Indiana
- Marathon Oil and Marathon Petroleum, (Note: In 2011, Marathon Oil spun off its downstream assets into Marathon Petroleum. Marathon Oil today is an exclusively upstream-oriented company.) continuations of The Ohio Oil Company
- ConocoPhillips and Phillips 66, (Note: In 2012, ConocoPhillips spun off its downstream assets into Phillips 66. ConocoPhillips today is an exclusively upstream-oriented company.) continuations of the Continental Oil Company

Many of today's largest oil and gas companies are or have acquired a descendant of Standard Oil. Moreover, many other companies have acquired or been created from Standard Oil descendants over time, including Unilever (which acquired Standard descendant Vaseline in 1987), TransUnion (created originally as a holding company for Standard descendant Union Tank Car) and Berkshire Hathaway (which later acquired Union Tank Car).

== Rights to the name ==
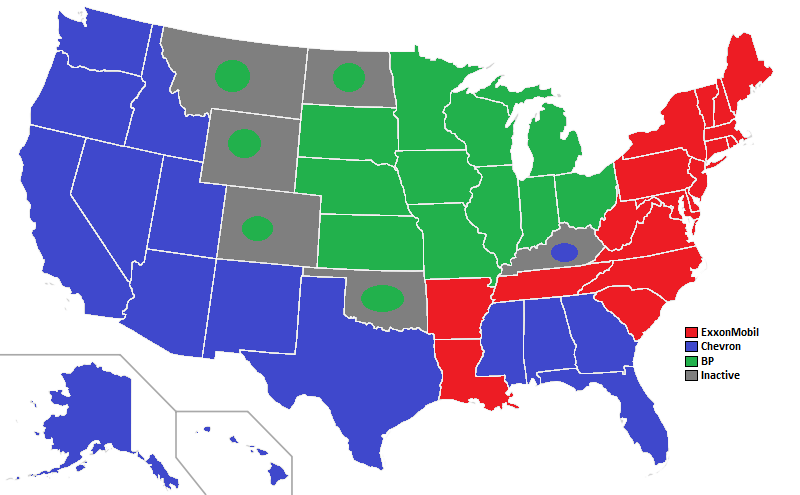
This map shows by state which company has the rights to the Standard Oil name. ExxonMobil has full international rights and continues to use the Esso name overseas. States that are gray have a dot representing their owners, but are not actively being used; ExxonMobil operates in all these states and have de facto claimed the trademark.

Of the 39 "Baby Standards", 11 were given rights to the Standard Oil name, based on the state they were in. Conoco and Atlantic elected to use their respective names instead of the Standard name, and their rights would be claimed by other companies. By the 1980s, most companies were using their brand names instead of the Standard name, with Amoco being the last one to have widespread use of the "Standard" name, as it gave Midwestern owners the option of using the Amoco name or Standard.

Three supermajor companies now own the rights to the Standard name in the United States: ExxonMobil, Chevron, and BP. BP acquired its rights through acquiring Standard Oil of Ohio and merging with Amoco and has a small handful of stations in the Midwestern United States using the Standard name. Likewise, BP continues to sell marine fuel under the Sohio brand at various marinas throughout Ohio. ExxonMobil keeps the Esso trademark alive at stations that sell diesel fuel by selling "Esso Diesel" displayed on the pumps.

ExxonMobil has full international rights to the Standard name, and continues to use the Esso name overseas and in Canada. To protect its trademark, Chevron has one station in each state it owns the rights to be branded as Standard. Some of its Standard-branded stations have a mix of some signs that say Standard and some signs that say Chevron. Over time, Chevron has changed which station in a given state is the Standard station. As of 2024 Chevron got a new federal trademark registered for the Standard name for its new electric charging fuel stations. In 2016, ExxonMobil successfully asked a U.S. federal court to lift the 1930s trademark injunction that banned it from using the Esso brand in some states. Neither BP nor Chevron objected to the decision. ExxonMobil asked for it to be lifted primarily so it could have universal marketing material for its stations globally and, likewise, the Esso name returned to some minor station signage at both Exxon and Mobil stations.

As of 2021, six states that have the Standard Oil name rights are not being actively used by the companies that own them. Chevron withdrew from Kentucky (home of the Standard Oil of Kentucky, which Chevron acquired in 1961) in 2010, while BP gradually withdrew from five Great Plains and Rocky Mountain states (Colorado, Montana, North Dakota, Oklahoma, and Wyoming) since the initial conversion of Amoco sites to BP. As ExxonMobil has stations in all of these states, with the aforementioned minor signage ExxonMobil has de facto claimed the Standard trademark in these states, though they are still held by their respective rights holders.

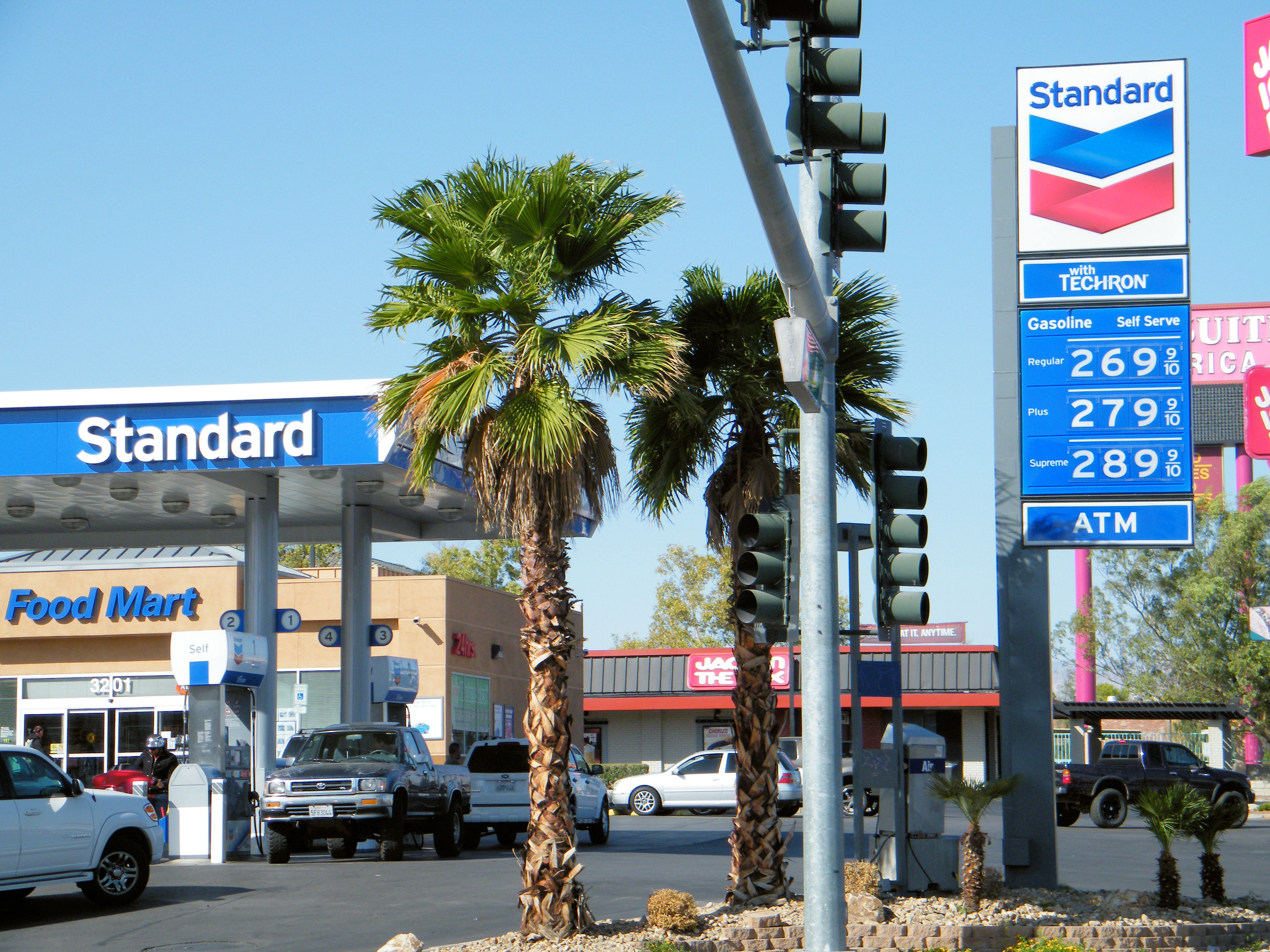
One of 15 Chevron stations branded as "Standard" to protect Chevron's trademark; this one is in Paradise, Nevada

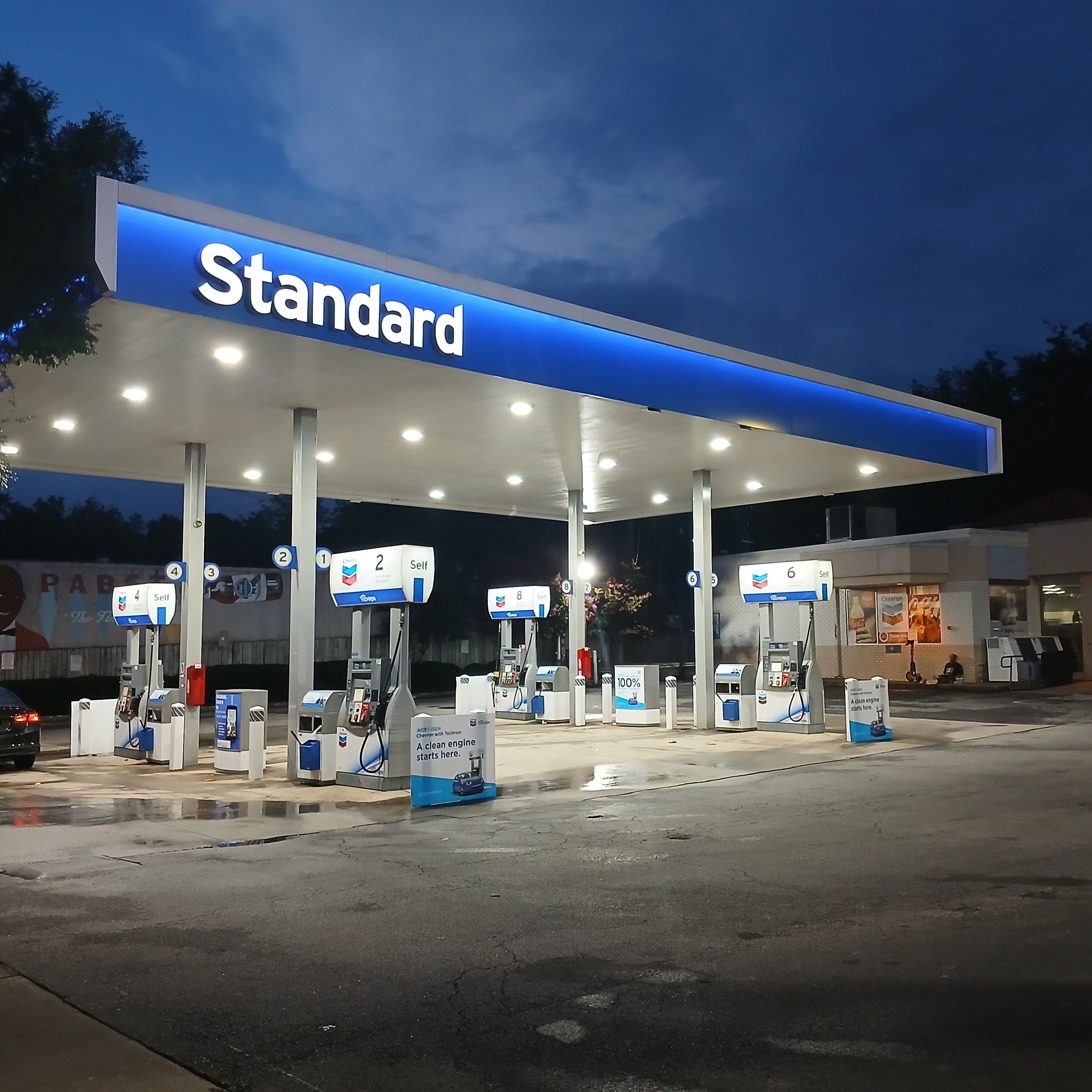
Standard Oil branded Chevron Gas Station in Atlanta, Georgia in 2026.

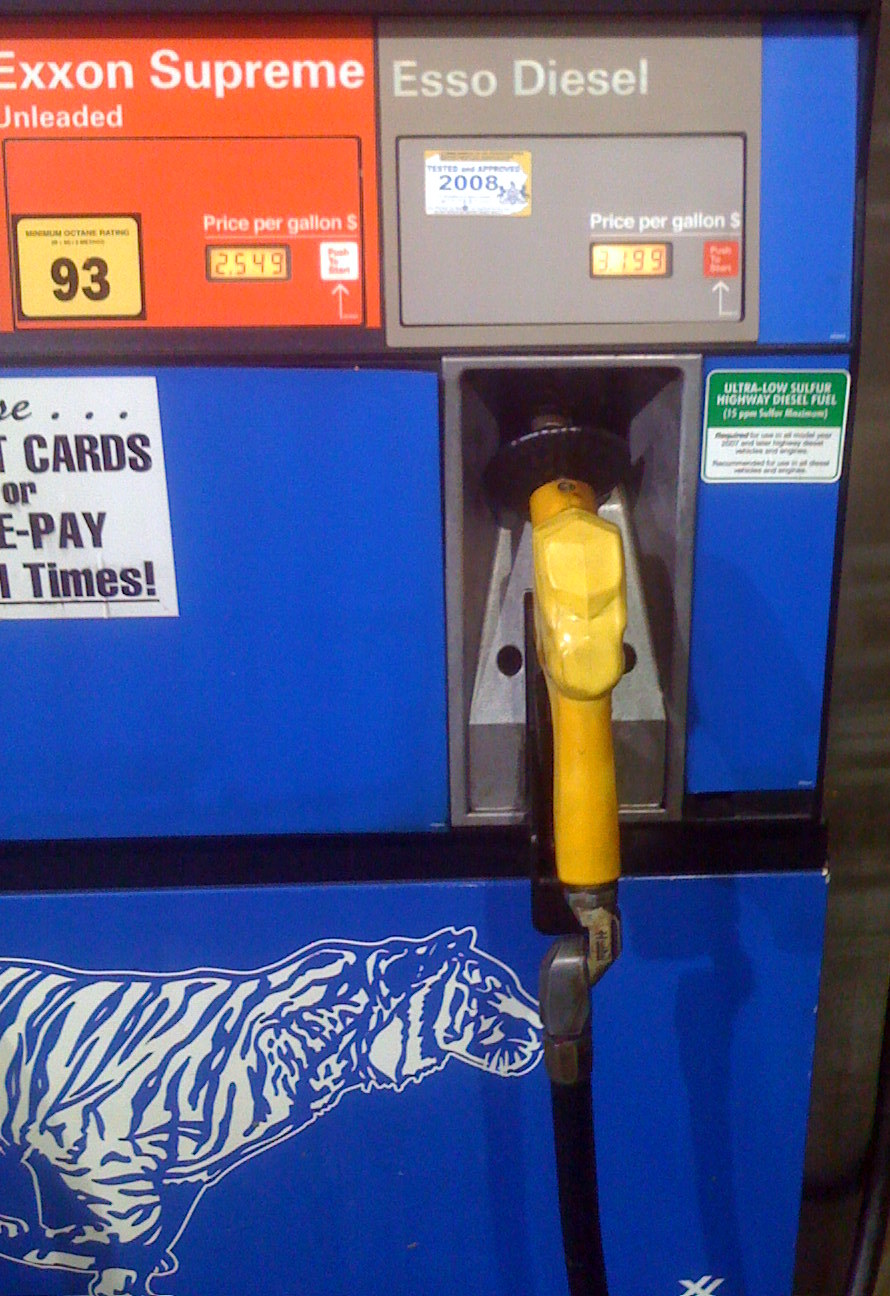
A combination gasoline/diesel pump at an Exxon in Zelienople, Pennsylvania selling Exxon gasoline and "Esso Diesel"

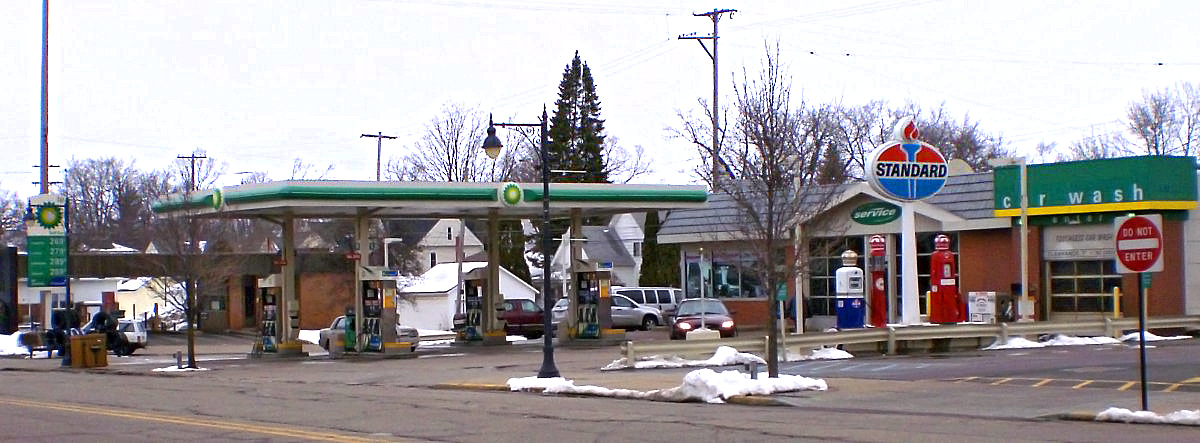
BP station with "torch and oval" Standard sign in Durand, Michigan

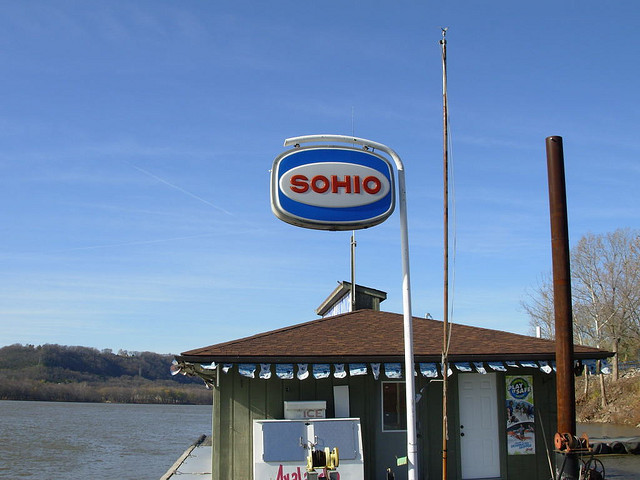
BP continues to sell marine fuel under the Sohio brand at various marinas on Ohio waterways and in Ohio state parks in order to protect its rights in the Sohio and Standard Oil names.

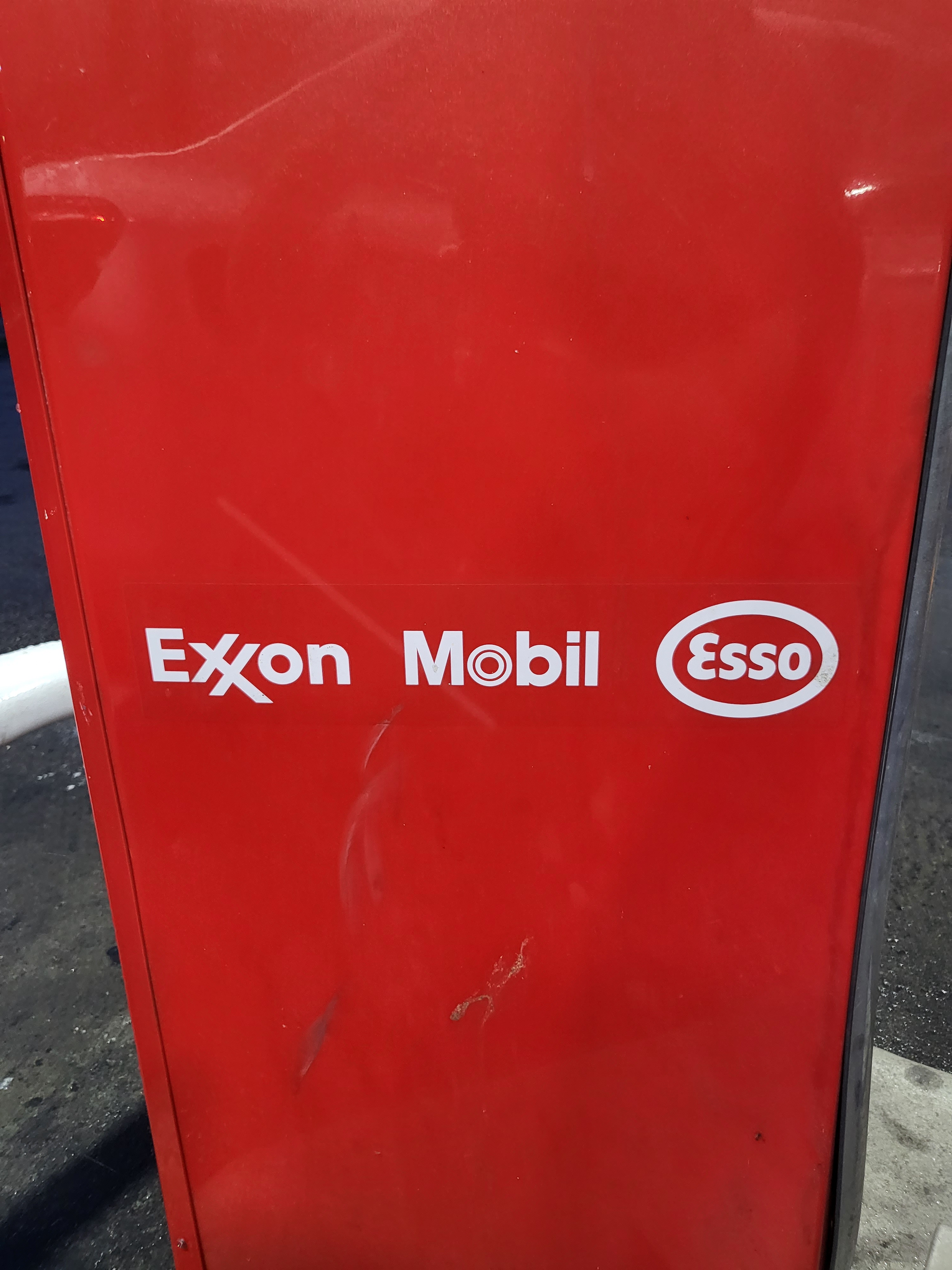
Station signage at an Exxon station in Columbus, Ohio, featuring the Esso logo, while BP owns the rights to the Standard Oil name in Ohio

== See also ==
- History of ExxonMobil
- Standard Oil Gasoline Station (disambiguation)

== Bibliography ==
- Bringhurst, Bruce (1979). Antitrust and the Oil Monopoly: The Standard Oil Cases, 1890–1911. New York: Greenwood Press.
- Giddens, Paul H. (1976). Standard Oil Co. (Companies and men). New York: Ayer Co. Publishing.
- Henderson, Wayne (1996). Standard Oil: The First 125 Years. New York: Motorbooks International.
- Knowlton, Evelyn H. & Gibb, George S. (1956). History of Standard Oil Co.: Resurgent Years 1911–1927. New York: Harper & Row.
- Lamoreaux, Naomi R. (2019). "The Problem of Bigness: From Standard Oil to Google". Journal of Economic Perspectives. Vol. 33, no. 3. pp. 94–117. doi:10.1257/jep.33.3.94.
- Latham, Earl, ed. (1949). John D. Rockefeller: Robber Baron or Industrial Statesman?.
- Montague, Gilbert Holland (1902). The Rise And Progress of the Standard Oil Co.
- ——— (February 1902). "The Rise and Supremacy of the Standard Oil Co". Quarterly Journal of Economics. Vol. 16, no. 2. pp. 265–292. JSTOR 1882746.
- ——— (February 1903). "The Later History of the Standard Oil Co". Quarterly Journal of Economics. Vol. 17, no. 2. pp. 293–325. JSTOR 1883667.
- Nevins, Allan (1940). John D. Rockefeller: The Heroic Age of American Enterprise.
- Nowell, Gregory P. (1994). Mercantile States and the World Oil Cartel, 1900–1939. Cornell University Press. ISBN 9780801428784.
- Olien, Diana Davids, and Roger M. Olien. "Why Big Bad Oil?" OAH Magazine of History 11#1 (1996), pp. 22–27. online
- Tarbell, Ida M. (1904). The History of the Standard Oil Co. Archived from the original on February 20, 2004.
- Williamson, Harold F. & Daum, Arnold R. (1959). The American Petroleum Industry: The Age of Illumination, 1859–1899. Vol. 1.
- ——— & ——— (1964). American Petroleum Industry: the Age of Energy 1899–1959. Vol. 2.
