= Schedule 13D =

Document to be filed when passing certain thresholds of public shareholdings

Schedule 13D is an SEC filing that generally must be submitted within five business days by an investor who acquires beneficial ownership of more than 5 percent of a covered class of equity securities with control intent; amendments are due within two business days.

== Form uses ==
13D filings allow the investing public to see who a public company's large shareholders are, and, perhaps more importantly, why they have an interest in the company. These filings may be a precursor to hostile takeovers, company breakups, and other "change of control" events.

== Reading the form ==
Schedule 13D consists of seven different sections:

- Security and Issuer - This section contains basic information regarding the type and class of the security and the contact information of the owner.
- Identity and Background - This section contains even more background into the owner, including if they were involved in any criminal activity in the past.
- Source and Amount of Funds or Other Considerations - This section lets investors know where the money is coming from. The most important use for this section is in determining if a buyout situation is overleveraged, when a majority of the purchase is leveraged or borrowed capital.
- Purpose of Transaction - This is the most important portion of the 13D filing. It allows you to see why they are buying shares in the company, whether it be for acquisition, hostile takeover, proxy battle, or simply because they believe it is undervalued.
- Interest in Securities of the Issuer - This section states the express purpose of the transaction, which should be explained better in section 4 (Purpose of Transaction).
- Contracts, Arrangements, Understandings or Relationships with Respect to the Securities of the Issuer - This section contains any special relationships between the owner and the company. This is important to be sure that the buying is legitimate and not just a friend purchasing stock or the result of some other agreement.
- Materials to Be Filed as Exhibits - This is the second most important section. It contains any exhibits that may be filed along with the form. This is famously used for the filing of letters to management in the event of a hostile takeover. Exhibits can also elaborate on the Purpose of Transaction (Section 4).

== Services ==
An aggregate database of schedules 13D, 13G, 13F are provided by private service providers such as Edgar.

== See also ==
- Schedule 13G
- Schedule TO
- Form 13F
