= Schedule TO =

U.S. financial form, Tender Offer Statement

Schedule TO is a required filing form of the United States Securities and Exchange Commission.

Under the United States federal Securities Exchange Act of 1934, parties who will own more than five percent of a class of a company's securities after making a tender offer for securities registered under the Act must file a Schedule TO with the SEC. The SEC also requires any person acquiring more than five percent of a voting class of a company's Section 12 registered equity securities directly or by tender offer to file a Schedule 13D.
