= HRI =

HRI may refer to:

== Airports ==
- Hermiston Municipal Airport in Hermiston, Oregon, United States
- Mattala Rajapaksa International Airport in Sri Lanka

== Businesses and organizations ==
- Hawaii Reserves, a subsidiary of Deseret Management Corporation
- Herald Investment Trust, a British investment trust
- Horse Racing Ireland, the governing body of horse racing on the island of Ireland
- Horticulture Research International
- Hotel, Restaurant and Institutional Management
- Human Rights Initiative of North Texas, an American non-governmental organization
- Human Rights Internet, a Canadian non-governmental organization

== Hospitals ==
- Huddersfield Royal Infirmary, in the United Kingdom
- Hull Royal Infirmary, in the United Kingdom

== Research institutes ==
- Harish-Chandra Research Institute, in Allahabad, Uttar Pradesh, India
- Heart Research Institute, in Camperdown, New South Wales, Australia
- Harte Research Institute for Gulf of Mexico Studies, at Texas A&M University–Corpus Christi
- Heffter Research Institute, in New Mexico, United States

== Other uses ==
- Hri (Buddhism)
- Heme-regulated inhibitor kinase
- Human Readable Interpretation
- Human robot interaction
- Humanitarian Response Index
