= William Stamps Farish III =

American businessman and former ambassador

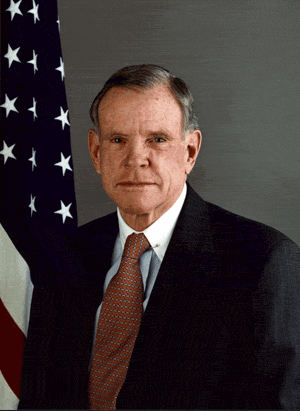

United States Ambassador to the United Kingdom
- In office July 12, 2001 – July 10, 2004
- President: George W. Bush
- Preceded by: Philip Lader
- Succeeded by: Robert H. Tuttle

Personal details
- Born: March 17, 1939 (age 87) Houston, Texas, U.S.
- Party: Republican
- Spouse: Sarah Sharp (m. 1962)
- Relations: William Farish II (grandfather); Martha F. Gerry (aunt)
- Children: 4
- Education: University of Virginia

William Stamps Farish III (born March 17, 1939) is an American businessman and a former US ambassador to the UK from 2001 until 2004.

== Family and early life ==
Farish was an only child. His father, Army Lt. William Stamps Farish Jr., died in a training flight near Waxahachie, Texas, when he was 4 years old. His grandfather was William Stamps Farish II, the founder of Humble Oil and Refining Company, which struck oil in the Houston suburb Humble, part of what was later to become the Exxon behemoth. William Stamps Farish II was appointed chairman of Standard Oil of New Jersey in 1933 and was its president from 1937 to 1942. His other grandfather was Robert E. Wood, who was the chief executive officer of Sears, Roebuck & Co. Wood was the leader in the Old Right movement from the 1920s through the 1960s as well as a key financial backer of the America First Committee. Farish grew up in Houston, where he attended St. John's School and, after graduating from South Kent School (CT) during 1958, graduated from the University of Virginia.

His mother, who before her marriage was Mary Wood, was said to be close to George H. W. Bush (later 41st President of the United States) and his wife Barbara Bush. When George Bush moved to Texas in 1948, it was the Farish connection that gave him his start in his career in the oil industry. Farish was taken in "almost like family," said Barbara Bush, during her husband's unsuccessful U.S. Senate campaign in 1964. During that campaign, Farish claimed to have been the first man to whom Bush confided his ultimate aim was to be president one day.

The Bush-Farish alliance dated back to 1929. In that year the Wall Street investment bank of W. Averell Harriman bought Dresser Industries (later Halliburton), a supplier of oil-pipeline to Standard Oil and other oil companies. George H. W. Bush's father, Prescott Bush, was a Harriman and Company executive who became a director and financier of Dresser and he served on the board of directors for 22 years.

== Career ==
He later served as President of Navarro Exploration Company. Farish was also a founding Director of Eurus, Inc., a bank holding company in New York as well as of Capital National Bank in Houston. Farish owns W.S. Farish & Co., a trust company based in Houston. In 2003, he was awarded an honorary Doctor of Laws from the University of Kentucky. He has served on the board of directors of Vaalco Energy Inc.

In 1966, he entered the Board of directors of Zapata Petroleum Company founded in 1953 by George H. W. Bush. Farish said to have been the first man to whom Bush confided his ambition to be president one day. Farish was George H. W. Bush's very first personal aide when he went into politics, and 28 years later, before the Bushes left the White House, his son, William Stamps Farish IV, also served in that position.

Farish was in the investment business. He owned the W.S. Farish & Co. investment firm, he managed the blind trust that Bush had to set up when he became vice-president in the Eighties. He had dealings in oil and gas exploration, mining, cattle ranching and local television stations.

== Lane's End Farm ==
A breeder of thoroughbred racehorses, in 1979 Farish bought the 240 acres that had been Bosque Bonita Farm in Versailles, Kentucky. Over the years it would be expanded to 1,800-acre (7.3 km^{2}) and renamed Lane's End Farm.

He also owns a home in the horse community of Wellington, Florida.

Lane's End has a secondary 400-acre (1.6 km^{2}) operation near Hempstead, Texas. Farish's operations have bred and/or raced over 225 horses that became stakes winners, both individually and with partners. In 1972, his horse Bee Bee Bee won the Preakness Stakes and his filly Casual Look won a British Classic, the 2003 Epsom Oaks. In 1992, and again in 1999, he received the Eclipse Award for Outstanding Breeder. Farish has served as chairman of Churchill Downs, home to the Kentucky Derby.

=== Horse racing honors ===
In 1987 the Keeneland Association honored William S. Farish III with its Mark of Distinction for his contribution to Keeneland and the Thoroughbred industry.

In 2019, Farish was voted into the National Museum of Racing and Hall of Fame as one of its esteemed Pillars of the Turf.

With his wife, he was invited to ride in the King's procession at Royal Ascot 2023.

=== Ambassador to the U.K. ===
Farish was nominated by President George W. Bush as U.S. Ambassador to the United Kingdom on March 5, 2001, appointed on July 11, 2001, and served until he resigned in early summer 2004.

The United Kingdom newspaper The Guardian commented on his low profile during the period leading up to the Iraq War. Christopher Meyer, who was British Ambassador to Washington during Farish's service, said that "as ambassador [Farish] proved as agreeable as he was invisible."

== Personal life ==
Farish wed Sarah Sharp, a stepdaughter of Bayard Sharp (1913–2002), a Du Pont heir, when Farish was 23 and Sarah was 19.

They are the parents of one son, William Stamps Farish IV, and three daughters, Mary Farish Johnston, Laura Farish Chadwick and Hillary Farish Stratton. Laura Farish, one of his daughters, worked in the White House as one of George H. W. Bush's scheduling aides.

Diplomatic posts
Preceded by Philip Lader	United States Ambassador to the United Kingdom; 2001–2004	Succeeded by Robert H. Tuttle
