= SS R. W. Gallagher =

History

United States
- Name: R. W. Gallagher
- Namesake: Ralph W. Gallagher
- Owner: Standard Oil Company of New Jersey
- Builder: Bethlehem Shipbuilding Corp., Sparrow's Point
- Cost: US$2,000,000
- Yard number: 4307
- Laid down: 11 January 1937
- Launched: 22 January 1938
- Sponsored by: Mrs. Mary E. Gallagher
- Completed: 3 August 1938
- Commissioned: 8 August 1938
- Home port: Wilmington
- Identification: US Official Number 237760; Call sign WPKP
- Fate: Sunk, 13 July 1942

General characteristics
- Type: Tanker
- Tonnage: 7,989 GRT; 4,738 NRT; 12,950 DWT
- Length: 445 ft 4 in (135.74 m)
- Beam: 64 ft 2 in (19.56 m)
- Depth: 35 ft 2 in (10.72 m)
- Installed power: 985 Nhp, 3,000 ihp
- Propulsion: 2 x Bethlehem Shipbuilding Corp. steam turbines, double reduction geared to one screw
- Speed: 13 knots (15 mph; 24 km/h)
- Armament: During WWII; 1 × 5 in (127 mm) naval gun; 1 × 3 in (76 mm) naval gun; 2 × .50 cal (12.7 mm) machine guns; 2 × .30 cal (7.62 mm) machine guns

R. W. Gallagher was a steam turbine-powered tanker built in 1938 by Bethlehem Shipbuilding Corporation of Quincy for Standard Oil Company of New Jersey with intention of operating between the oil-producing ports of the southern United States and Mexico and the Northeast. The tanker spent her entire career in coastwise trade and was torpedoed and sunk on one of regular journeys in July 1942 by German submarine U-67.

== Design and construction ==
Early in 1936 Standard Oil Company of New Jersey decided to expand and modernize their fleet of tankers operating between the southern oil ports and New York and New Jersey. A contract for four of them, of approximately 13,000 deadweight, was awarded to the Bethlehem Shipbuilding Corp. and the ship was laid down at the shipbuilder's yard in Sparrow's Point (yard number 4307) on 11 January 1937, and launched on 22 January 1938, with Mrs. Mary E. Gallagher of New York, wife of Ralph W. Gallagher, serving as the sponsor. The ship was named after Ralph W. Gallagher, an acting vice-president of Standard Oil at the time of construction and future president of the company. The ceremony was attended by nearly 800 people including 450 dignitaries, such as James J. Walker, former mayor of New York, accompanied by his wife Betty Compton and Rear-Admiral Emory S. Land, head of Maritime Commission. The ship was built on the modified Isherwood bracketless principle of longitudinal framing developed by the Bethlehem Shipbuilding's naval architect H. P. Frear. It allowed to economize in weight and ease of construction and was used to build ships for the first time during construction of these four tankers. The tanker had 24 oil compartments capable of carrying 4,500,000 gallons of oil, a dry cargo hold in the front of the vessel which could be accessed through a large hatch on the main deck. The ship had one main deck, and was also equipped with radio including a radio direction finder. The tanker was completely fireproof throughout and was specially equipped for operation in the tropics.

As built, the ship was 445 feet 4 inches (135.74 m) long (between perpendiculars) and 64 feet 2 inches (19.56 m) abeam, a depth of 35 feet 2 inches (10.72 m). R. W. Gallagher was assessed at 7,989 GRT and 4,738 NRT and had deadweight of approximately 12,950. The vessel had a steel hull with double bottom, and two oil-burning steam turbines, producing 985 Nhp of power, double reduction geared to one screw propeller, that moved the ship at up to 13.0 knots (15.0 mph; 24.1 km/h). The steam for the engine was supplied by two water-tube boilers fitted for oil fuel.

Upon completion, the tanker departed Baltimore for trial trip on 3 August during which the steamer performed satisfactorily. Following successful trials the tanker left for New York on 8 August to get prepared for commercial service.

== Operational history ==
After completion of sea trials the tanker was transferred to her owners and arrived in New York on 10 August 1938. From there she sailed on her maiden voyage for the oil ports in the Gulf of Mexico and arrived at Baytown for loading on 18 August. The ship then proceeded to Corpus Christi where she loaded oil and returned to Boston on 13 September concluding her maiden voyage. The tanker continued working on the same route through mid-1941 transporting oil from the ports of Corpus Christi, Baytown, Galveston and Baton Rouge to Standard Oil refineries in Baltimore, Boston or Philadelphia. In July 1941 the tanker was shifted to operate between Caribbean refineries located on Aruba and Curaçao and mainland of the United States. She also conducted one trip from Curaçao to Rio de Janeiro in December 1941. Upon return the tanker proceeded to Newport News where after evaluation she was time chartered to the United States War Shipping Administration on 20 April 1942. The vessel then was put into Newport News Shipbuilding & Drydock Corp. dock in Norfolk where she was defensively armed and restructured to include accommodations for armed guardsmen. After being released on 4 May 1942 the tanker returned to her usual coast-wise service. R. W. Gallagher was part of two Caribbean convoys, OT-3 and TO-4, but otherwise sailed independently.

R. W. Gallagher sailed from Newport News in ballast on 29 June 1942 as part of convoy KS-515 together with fifteen other merchant ships and reached Key West on 5 July. There the tanker as well as two other ships, SS Paul H. Harwood and SS Socony Vacuum, were met by destroyer Overton to serve as an escort to New Orleans. By the end of the day another steamer, SS Gulfbreeze, joined the convoy. The journey was rather uneventful for the first two days, but in the early morning hours on 7 July Paul H. Harwood was hit by a torpedo and had to be temporarily abandoned. Overton searched the area until noon next day but could not find the submarine while the small convoy continued its journey west.

=== Sinking ===
R.W. Gallagher left Baytown for Port Everglades transporting approximately 80,855 barrels of No.6 Navy fuel oil on 10 July 1942. The vessel was under command of captain Aage Petersen and had a crew of forty officers and men in addition to twelve Naval guards. The tanker first sailed to Bolivar Roads in Galveston Bay where she stayed for two days awaiting orders from the Navy as she were to continue unescorted on her trip. After receiving the instructions, the ship sailed out to her destination early in the morning of 12 July. The journey was uneventful until the vessel reached the Ship Shoal Wreck Buoy. At about 01:20 on 13 July the tanker was detected by German submarine U-67 lurking outside Louisiana coast in an approximate position 28°32′N 90°59′W, about 80 miles from Southwest Pass. At about 01:40 U-67 fired two torpedoes at the ship from a distance of approximately 600 meters. R. W. Gallagher was struck in quick succession by both torpedoes on her starboard side around No.3 hold and pump-room. The tanker immediately was put ablaze amidships and started listing to starboard as her engines stopped and a short circuit knocked out all electricity. The explosion destroyed several lifeboats and the captain was effectively cut off at the forecastle from the rest of the crew and unable to issue orders. The crew managed to launch one lifeboat and one raft with the rest of the crew jumping off into the water to avoid the flames. Meanwhile, the submarine seeing that the vessel does not sink rapidly fired another torpedo from approximately 500 meters to deliver coup de grâce about 10 minutes later aiming for the engines, but inexplicably missed. U-67 fired another torpedo several minutes later obtaining a hit, but due to piston malfunction there was no explosion. Lack of bow torpedoes and arrival of patrol vessel Boutwell on the scene forced U-67 to leave the area. Meanwhile, the captain stayed aboard the ship until she was about to capsize and had to jump off at about 02:20. The tanker finally capsized forty minutes later but did not sink until approximately 05:30. After cutter Boutwell collected all survivors it was determined that three of them required emergency help and a plane was called for to transport them to the hospital. US Coast Guard PH-2 plane from Biloxi Air Station was dispatched and arrived around 07:00 and took all three to New Orleans. All three of them later died at the hospital. The other survivors were landed in New Orleans by Boutwell at 19:15. Overall, there were forty-two survivors and ten casualties in the attack.
