= History of ExxonMobil =

ExxonMobil, an American multinational oil and gas corporation presently based out of Texas, has had one of the longest histories of any company in its industry. A direct descendant of John D. Rockefeller's Standard Oil, the company traces its roots as far back as 1866 to the founding of the Vacuum Oil Company, which would become part of ExxonMobil through its own merger with Mobil during the 1930s. The present name of the company comes from a 1999 merger of Standard Oil's New Jersey and New York successors, which adopted the names Exxon and Mobil respectively throughout the middle of the 20th century. Because of Standard Oil of New Jersey's ownership over all Standard Oil assets at the time of the 1911 breakup, ExxonMobil is seen by some as the definitive continuation of Standard Oil today.

Today, ExxonMobil is the largest investor-owned oil and gas company in the world by revenue and market capitalization. The company is frequently included near the top of the Fortune 500 and Fortune Global 500, and trails only Saudi Aramco in market capitalization among all the world's energy firms.

== Standard Oil (1870–1911) ==
=== Origins ===
Both Exxon and Mobil were descendants of Standard Oil, established by John D. Rockefeller and partners in 1870 as the Standard Oil Company of Ohio. In 1882, it together with its affiliated companies was incorporated as the Standard Oil Trust with Standard Oil Company of New Jersey and Standard Oil Company of New York as its largest companies. The Anglo-American Oil Company was established in the United Kingdom in 1888. In 1890, Standard Oil, together with local ship merchants in Bremen established Deutsch-Amerikanische Petroleum Gesellschaft (later: Esso A.G.). In 1891, a sale branch for the Netherlands and Belgium, American Petroleum Company, was established in Rotterdam. At the same year, a sale branch for Italy, Società Italo Americana pel Petrolio, was established in Venice.

=== Scrutiny and litigation ===
The Standard Oil Trust was dissolved under the Sherman Antitrust Act in 1892; however, it reemerged as the Standard Oil Interests. In 1893, the Chinese and the whole Asian kerosene market was assigned to Standard Oil Company of New York in order to improve trade with the Asian counterparts. In 1898, Standard Oil of New Jersey acquired controlling stake in Imperial Oil of Canada. In 1899, Standard Oil Company of New Jersey became the holding company for the Standard Oil Interests.

The anti-monopoly proceedings against Standard Oil were launched in 1898. The reputation of Standard Oil in the public eye suffered badly after publication of Ida M. Tarbell's classic exposé The History of the Standard Oil Co. in 1904, leading to a growing outcry for the government to take action against the company. By 1911, with public outcry at a climax, the Supreme Court of the United States ruled in Standard Oil Co. of New Jersey v. United States that Standard Oil must be dissolved and split into 34 companies, with two of them becoming Standard Oil Company of New Jersey (Jersey Standard for short) and Standard Oil of New York (Socony for short).

== Standard Oil Company of New Jersey (1911–1999) ==
=== Standard Oil Company of New Jersey (1911–1973) ===
Over the next few decades, Jersey Standard grew significantly. John Duston Archbold was the first president of Jersey Standard. Archbold was followed by Walter C. Teagle in 1917, under whose presidency Jersey Standard became the largest oil company in the world. In 1919, Jersey Standard acquired a 50% share in Humble Oil & Refining Co., a Texas oil-producer. In 1920, it was listed on the New York Stock Exchange. In the following years it acquired or established Tropical Oil Company of Colombia (1920), Standard Oil Company of Venezuela (1921; merged with Creole Petroleum in 1928 to become the operating subsidiary), and the Creole Petroleum Corporation (majority interest acquired in 1928).

Jersey Standard became a shareholder in the Iraq Petroleum Company at the end of the 1920s and acquired a 30% stake in ARAMCO in 1948.

In the Asia-Pacific region, Jersey Standard established through its Dutch subsidiary an exploration and production company Nederlandsche Koloniale Petroleum Maatschappij in 1912. In 1922, it found oil in Indonesia and in 1927, it built a refinery in Sumatra. It had oil production and refineries but no marketing network.

In 1924, Jersey Standard and General Motors pooled their tetraethyllead-related patents and established the Ethyl Gasoline Corporation. In 1927, Jersey Standard signed a 25-years cooperation agreement with IG Farben for the coal hydrogenation research in the United States. Jersey Standard assumed this cooperation to be beneficial as it believed the United States oil reserves to be exhausted in the near future and that the coal hydrogenation would give an access for producing synthetic fuels. It erected synthetic fuel plants in Bayway, Baton Rouge, and Baytown (unfinished). The interest in hydrogenation evaporated after discovery of the East Texas Oil Field. As a part of the cooperation between Jersey Standard and IG Farben, a joint company, Standard I.G. Company, was established with Jersey Standard having a stake of 80%. IG Farben transferred rights to the hydrogenation process outside of Germany to the joint venture in exchange of $35 million stake of Jersey Standard shares. In 1930, the joint company established Hydro Patents Company to license the hydrogenation process in the United States. The agreement with IG Farben gave to Jersey Standard access to patents related to polyisobutylene which assist Jersey Standard to advance in isobutolene polymerization and to produce the first butyl rubber in 1937. As the agreement with IG Farben gave to the German company a veto right of licensing chemical industry patents in the United States, including patent for butyl rubber, Jersey Standard was accused of treason by senator Harry S. Truman. In 1941, it opened the first commercial synthetic toluene plant.

Upon the merger of Socony and Vacuum Oil, some suggested that Jersey Standard and Standard Oil of California merge to maintain dominance in the oil industry, though no serious moves were ever made by either side.

In 1932, Jersey Standard acquired foreign assets of the Pan American Petroleum and Transport Company. In 1937, its assets in Bolivia were nationalized, followed by the nationalization of its assets in Mexico in 1938.

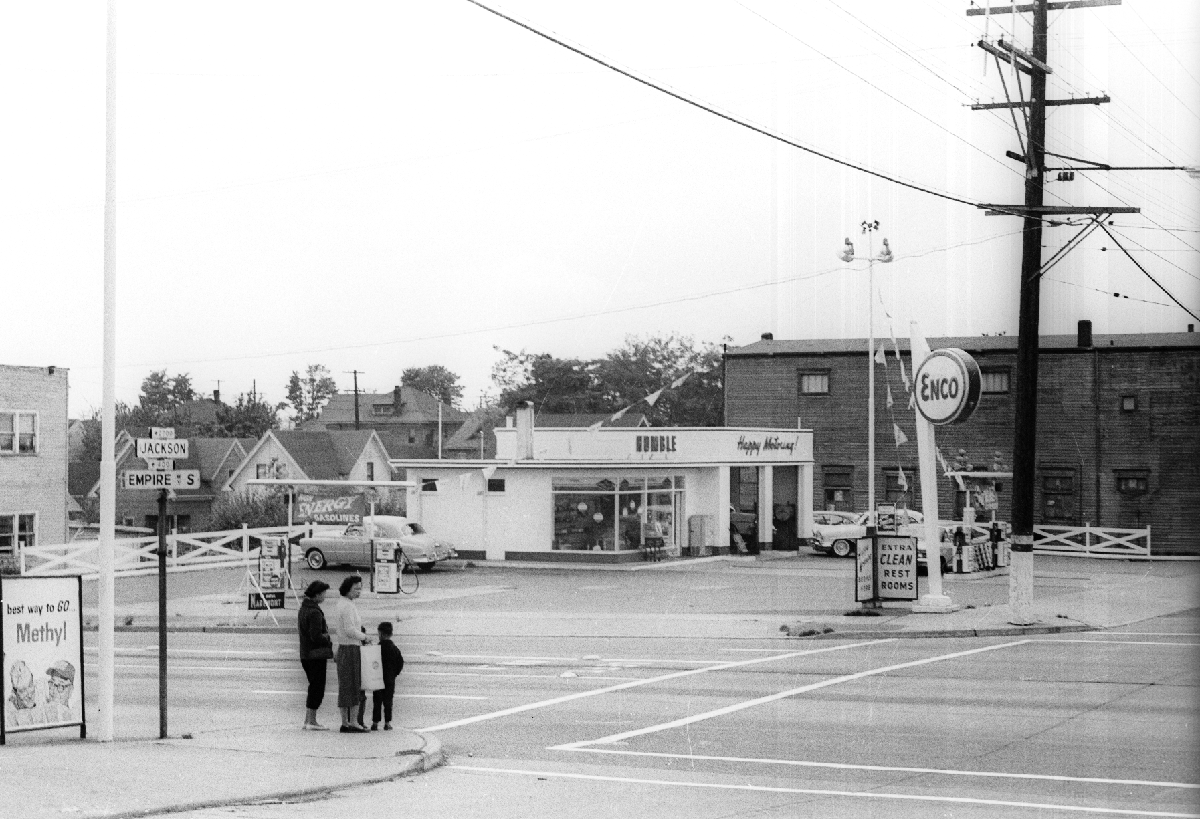
An Enco service station in Seattle in 1961

Since the 1911 Standard Oil Trust breakup, Jersey Standard used the trademark Esso, a phonetic pronunciation of the initials "S" and "O" in the name Standard Oil, as one of its primary brand names. However, several of the other Standard Oil spinoffs objected to the use of that name in their territories, and successfully got the U.S. federal courts in the 1930s to ban the Esso brand in those states. In those territories where the ban was in force, Jersey Standard instead marketed its products under the Enco or Humble names.

In the early stages of World War II, some of Standard Oil of New Jersey's product supplied the fuel-poor Axis powers.

In 1947, Jersey Standard and Royal Dutch Shell formed the joint venture Nederlandse Aardolie Maatschappij BV for oil and gas exploration and production in the Netherlands. In 1948, Jersey Standard acquired interests in the Arab-American Oil Company (Aramco).

Humble Oil became a wholly owned subsidiary of Jersey Standard and was reorganized into the United States marketing division of Jersey Standard in 1959. In 1967, Humble Oil purchased all remaining Signal stations from Standard Oil Company of California (today known as Chevron) In 1969, Humble Oil opened a refinery in Benicia, California, of which today is owned by Valero Energy.

In Libya, Jersey Standard made its first major oil discovery in 1959.

Exxon Chemical Company (originally named Enjay Chemicals) was established in 1965.

In 1955, when Fortune released its first Fortune 500 list, Jersey Standard both before and after it rebranded as Exxon was one of the top five companies on Fortune 500 between the first edition of the list and the year of its merger with Mobil and reaching the #1 spot on the list a few years between 1970 and 1995.

In 1965, Jersey Standard started to acquire coal assets through its affiliate Carter Oil (later renamed Exxon Coal, U.S.A.). For managing the Midwest and Eastern coal assets in the United States, the Monterey Coal Company was established in 1969. Carter Oil focused on the developing synthetic fuels from coal. In 1966, it started to develop the coal liquefaction process called the Exxon Donor Solvent Process. In April 1980, Exxon opened a 250-ton-per-day pilot plant in Baytown, Texas. The plant was closed and dismantled in 1982.

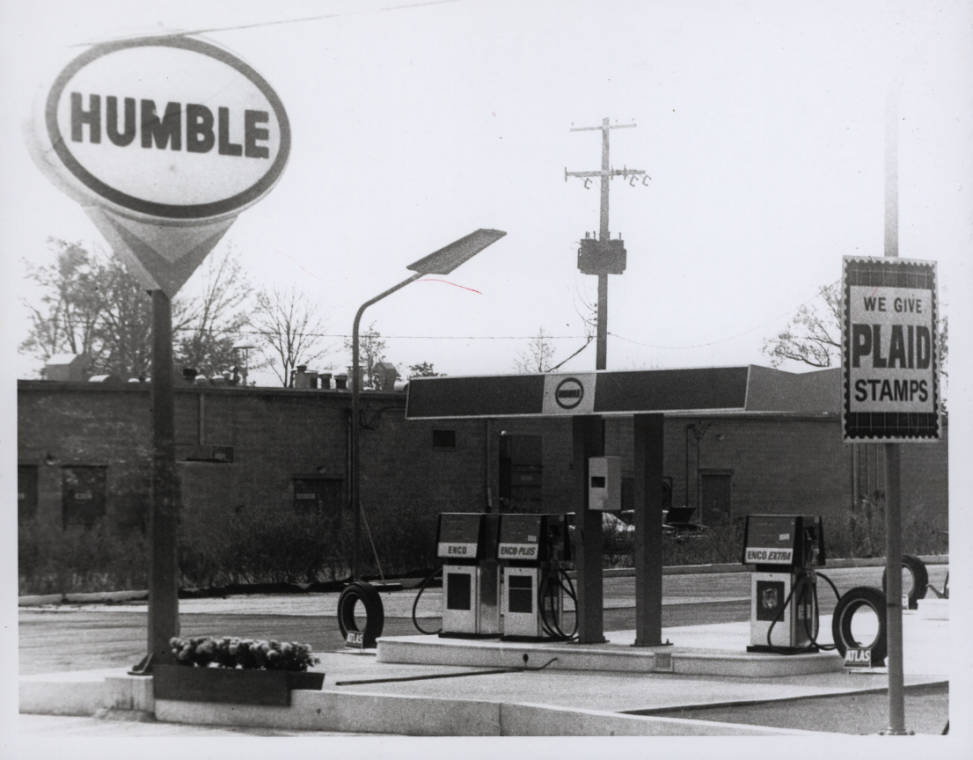
Humble gas station in the early 1970s

In late 1960s Jersey Standard task force was looking for projects 30 years in the future.

In April 1973, Exxon founded Solar Power Corporation, a wholly owned subsidiary for manufacturing of terrestrial photovoltaic cells. After the 1980s oil glut Exxon's internal report projected that solar would not become viable until 2012 or 2013. Consequently, Exxon sold Solar Power Corporation in 1984.

In the late 1960s, Jersey Standard entered into the nuclear industry. In 1969, it created a subsidiary, Jersey Nuclear Company (later: Exxon Nuclear Company), for manufacturing and marketing of uranium fuel, which was to be fabricated from uranium concentrates mined by the mineral department of Humble Oil (later: Exxon Minerals Company). In 1970, Jersey Nuclear opened a nuclear fuel manufacturing facility, now owned by Framatome, in Richland, Washington. The company started surface mining of uranium ore in Converse County, Wyoming, in 1970, solution mining in 1972, and underground mining in 1977. Uranium ore processing started in 1972. The facility was closed in 1984.

=== Exxon Corporation (1973–1999) ===
First Exxon logo, launched in 1973. It contained the red and blue colors of the Esso, Enco and Humble brands.

In 1972, Exxon was unveiled as the new, unified brand name for all former Enco and Esso outlets. At the same time, the company changed its corporate name from Standard Oil of New Jersey to Exxon Corporation, and Humble Oil became Exxon Company, U.S.A. The rebranding came after successful test-marketing of the Exxon name, under two experimental logos, in the fall and winter of 1971–72. The marketing test began on October 4, 1971, in six U.S. cities, with signs replaced at service stations and full-page advertisements in the local newspapers. (Note: The six cities where the Exxon name was first tested were Athens, Georgia; Battle Creek, Michigan; Manchester, New Hampshire; Nacogdoches, Texas; San Luis Obispo, California; and Zanesville, Ohio.) Exxon was "one of hundreds of names that came out of a computer and was then tested linguistically, psychologically, and for design potential." Along with the new name, Exxon settled on a rectangular logo using red lettering and blue trim on a white background, similar to the familiar color scheme on the old Enco and Esso logos. The rectangular Exxon logo, with the blue strip at the bottom and red lettering with the two 'X's interlinked together, was designed by noted industrial stylist Raymond Loewy. The interlinked 'X's are incorporated in the modern-day ExxonMobil corporate logo; in mid-2016, as part of a corporate rebranding accompanying the launch of ExxonMobil's "Synergy" fuel products, the mixed-case Exxon wordmark from the ExxonMobil corporate logo became the brand's main logo. The current form of the Exxon logo was made on March 3, 1972, by New York-based Louis Liska. Exxon replaced the Esso, Enco, and Humble brands in the United States on January 1, 1973.

Under the guidance of its paid consultants at Boston Consulting Group, Exxon announced in the 1970s that it would compete against IBM and Xerox. The mantra was "Information Is the Oil of the 21st Century". It launched Exxon Office Systems, and the early 1980s, Exxon retailed its fax machines and software through Sears. The venture failed since "the giant oil company failed to fully realize the subtleties of managing small high-tech companies." Exxon announced the closure of the venture at the end of 1984.

In 1973, Exxon acquired the Ray Point uranium ore processing facility which was shortly afterwards decommissioned.

Due to the oil embargo of 1973, Exxon and Mobil began to expand their exploration and production into the North Sea, the Gulf of Mexico, Africa, and Asia. Mobil diversified its activities into retail sale and packaging by acquiring the parent company of Montgomery Ward and Container Corporation of America.

In 1976, Exxon, through its subsidiary Intercor, entered into partnership with Colombian state owned company Carbocol to start coal mining in Cerrejón. In 1980, Exxon merged its assets in the mineral industry into newly established Exxon Minerals (later ExxonMobil Coal and Minerals). At the same year, Exxon entered into the oil shale industry by buying a 60% stake in the Colony Shale Oil Project in Colorado, United States, and 50% stake in the Rundle oil shale deposit in Queensland, Australia. On May 2, 1982, Exxon announced the termination of the Colony Shale Oil Project because of low oil-prices and increased expenses.

In 1985, Minolta introduced an autofocus SLR camera system named "Maxxum" in the United States. Originally, cameras (such as the Maxxum 7000) lenses and flashes used a logo with the X's crossed in 'MAXXUM'. Exxon considered this a violation of their trademark, and as a result, Minolta was allowed to distribute cameras already produced, but was forced to change the stylistic 'XX' and implement this as a change in new production. ExxonMobil similarly sued 21st Century Fox over its cable channel FXX, but the parties agreed to dismiss the suit in October 2015.

In 1986, Exxon Nuclear was sold to Kraftwerk Union, a nuclear arm of Siemens.

Exxon sold the Exxon Building (1251 Avenue of the Americas), its former headquarters in Rockefeller Center, to a unit of Mitsui Real Estate Development Co. Ltd. in 1986 for $610 million, and in 1989, moved its headquarters from Manhattan, New York City to the Las Colinas area of Irving, Texas. John Walsh, president of Exxon subsidiary Friendswood Development Company, stated that Exxon left New York because the costs were too high.

On March 24, 1989, the Exxon Valdez oil tanker struck Bligh Reef in Prince William Sound, Alaska and spilled more than 11 million US gallons (42,000 m^{3}) of crude oil. The Exxon Valdez oil spill was the second largest in U.S. history, and in the aftermath of the Exxon Valdez incident, the U.S. Congress passed the Oil Pollution Act of 1990. An initial award of US$5 billion punitive was reduced to $507.5 million by the US Supreme Court in June 2008, and distributions of this award commenced in 2008.

In 1996, Exxon entered into the Russian market by signing a production sharing agreement on the Sakhalin-I project, forming Exxon Neftegas in the process.

== Standard Oil of New York (1911–1998) ==
=== Socony (1911–1931) ===
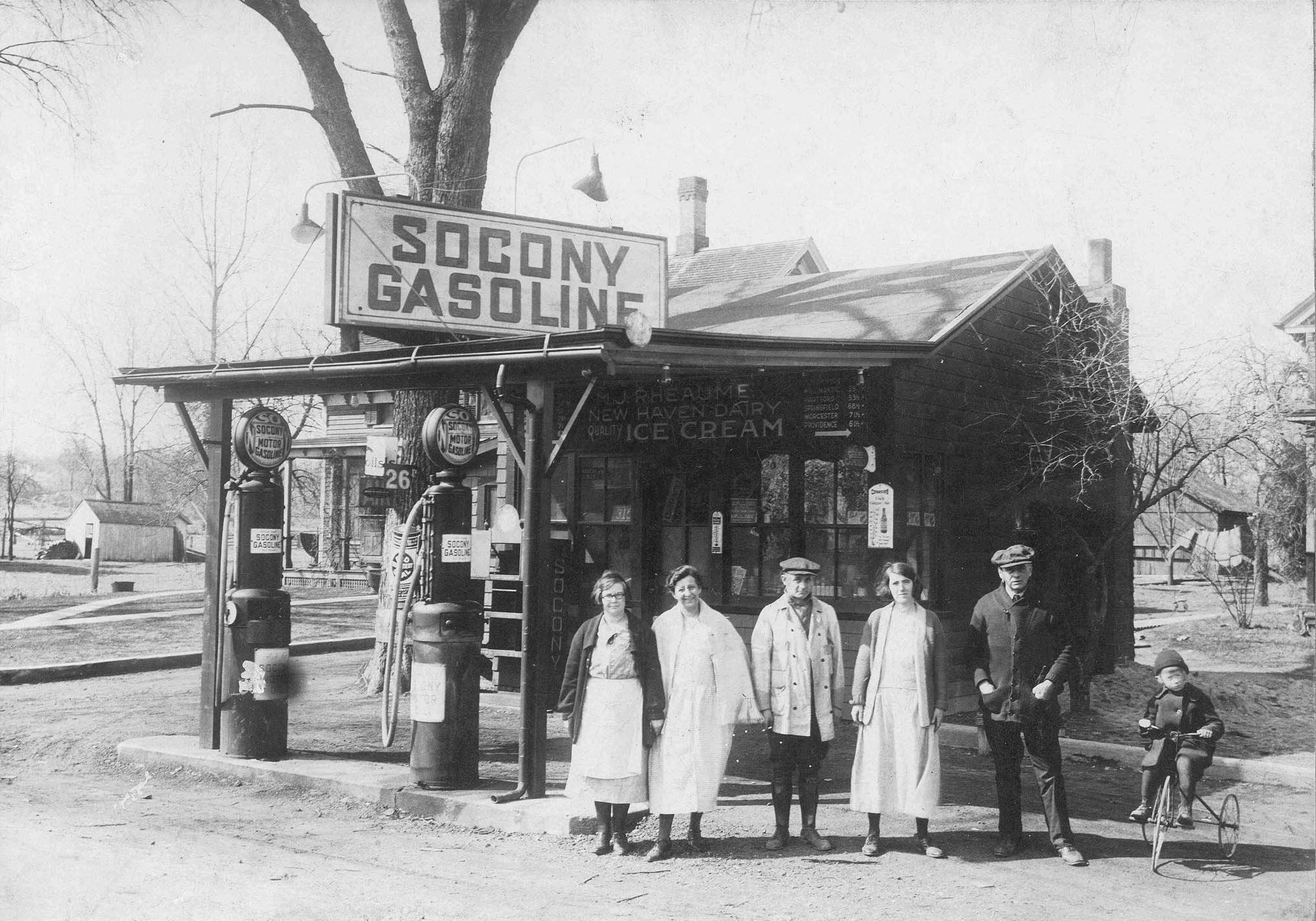
Socony gas station and store in Connecticut, 1916

Following the break-up of Standard Oil in 1911, the "Standard Oil Company of New York" (or 'Socony') was founded, along with 33 other successor companies.

Henry Clay Folger was head of the company until 1923, when he was succeeded by Herbert L. Pratt. Beginning February 29, 1928, on NBC, Socony Oil reached radio listeners with a comedy program, Soconyland Sketches, scripted by William Ford Manley and featuring Arthur Allen and Parker Fennelly as rural New Englanders. Socony continued to sponsor the show when it moved to CBS in 1934. In 1935, it became the Socony Sketchbook, with Christopher Morley and the Johnny Green orchestra.

=== Socony-Vacuum (1931–1966) ===
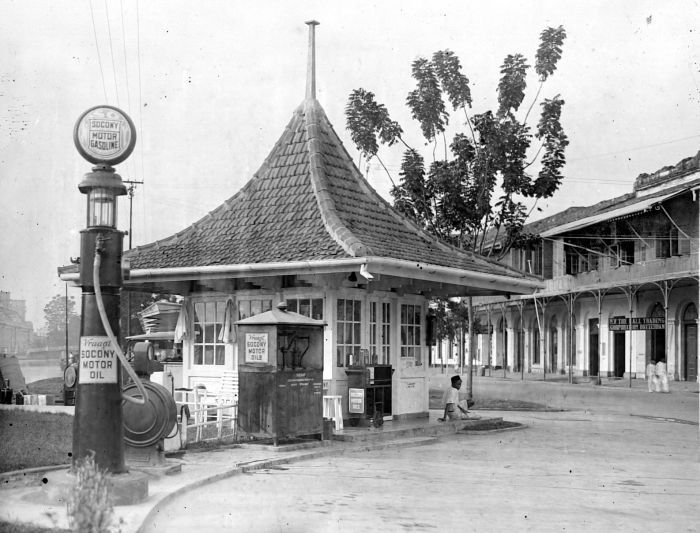
Socony petrol station in the Dutch East Indies, 1931

In 1931, Socony merged with Vacuum Oil Company to form Socony-Vacuum. Vacuum Oil had used "Mobiloil" branding for automobile lubricating oil since 1904, and by 1918 it became recognizable enough that the company filed for its registration as a trademark; it was registered in 1920.

Socony became a shareholder in the Iraq Petroleum Company in the late 1920s and in 1948 acquired a 10% stake in ARAMCO.

In 1933, Socony-Vacuum and Jersey Standard (which had oil production and refineries in Indonesia) merged their interests in the Far East into a 50–50 joint venture. Standard-Vacuum Oil Co., or "Stanvac", operated in 50 countries, including New Zealand, China, and the region of East Africa, before it was dissolved in 1962. In 1935, Socony Vacuum Oil opened the huge Mammoth Oil Port on Staten Island which had a capacity of handling 250 million gallons of petroleum products a year and could transship oil from ocean-going tankers and river barges.

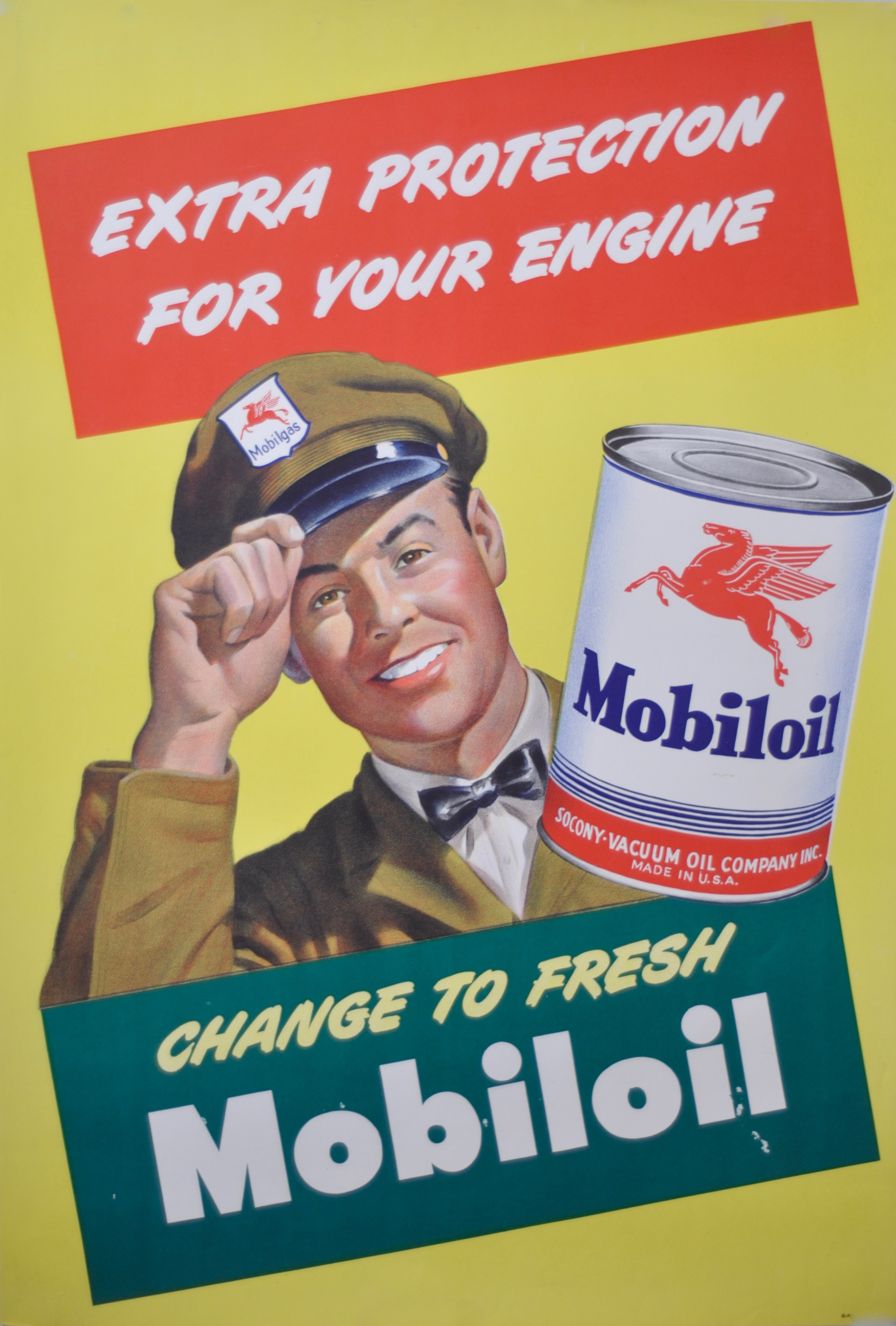
Mobiloil Ad (1950)

In 1940, Socony-Vacuum's gasoline buying practices led to the major antitrust law case United States v. Socony-Vacuum Oil Co. The case originated with Socony-Vacuum's practices of organizing a cartel among the "major" oil companies in which they bought oil—known as "hot oil"—from independent producers and stored the surplus in tanks to limit the supply of oil available on the market and keep the price of oil artificially high. In its decision, the U.S. Supreme Court ruled that regardless of the purpose of the price fixing or if the prices varied, such conduct was illegal in and of itself: "Under the Sherman Act a combination formed for the purpose and with the effect of raising, depressing, fixing, pegging, or stabilizing the price of a commodity in interstate or foreign commerce is illegal per se..." This rule remains in use today for agreements that appear on their face to always or almost always restrict competition and reduce output.

=== Mobil (1955–1998) ===
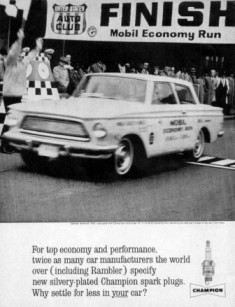
The Mobil Economy Run generated publicity and promotions such as this 1962 advertisement by Champion spark plugs with a Rambler American, 1962

In 1955, Socony-Vacuum was renamed Socony Mobil Oil Company. In 1963, it changed its trade name from "Mobiloil" to simply "Mobil", introducing a new logo (created by New York graphic design firm Chermayeff & Geismar). To celebrate its 100th anniversary in 1966, "Socony" was dropped from the corporate name.

From 1936 to 1968, Mobil sponsored an economy run each year (except during World War II) in which domestic automobiles of various manufacturers in a number of price and size classes were driven by light-footed drivers on cross-country runs. The Economy Run originated with the Gilmore Oil Company of California in 1936 (which was purchased by Socony-Vacuum in 1940) and later became the Mobilgas Economy Run, and still later the Mobil Economy Run. The cars driven in the economy run were fueled with Mobil gasoline, and Mobiloil and lubricants were also used. The vehicles in each class that achieved the highest fuel economy numbers were awarded the coveted title as the Mobilgas Economy Run winner.

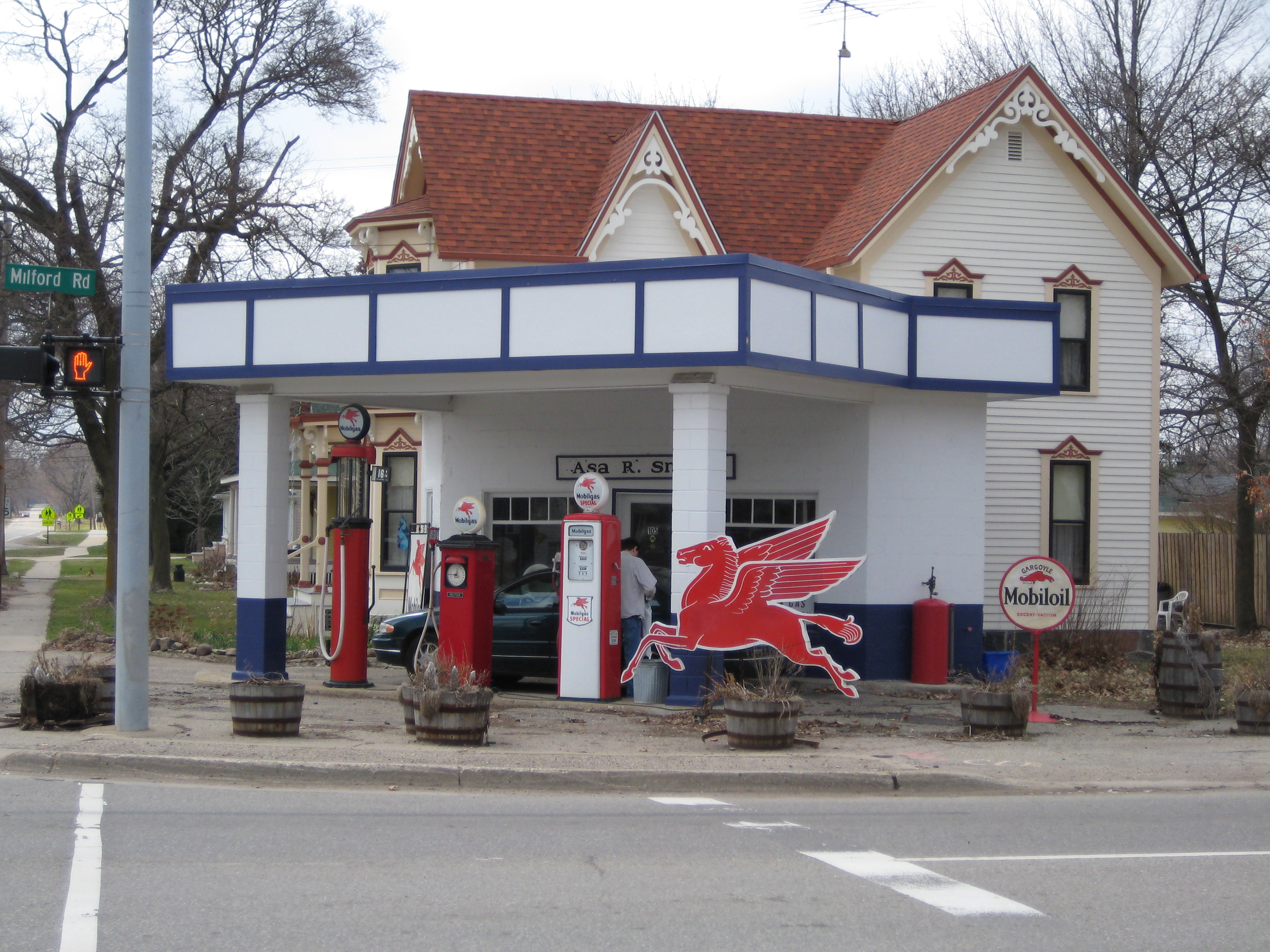
Former Mobil station in Michigan, displaying several pumps and a Mobil Pegasus sign, pictured in 2008

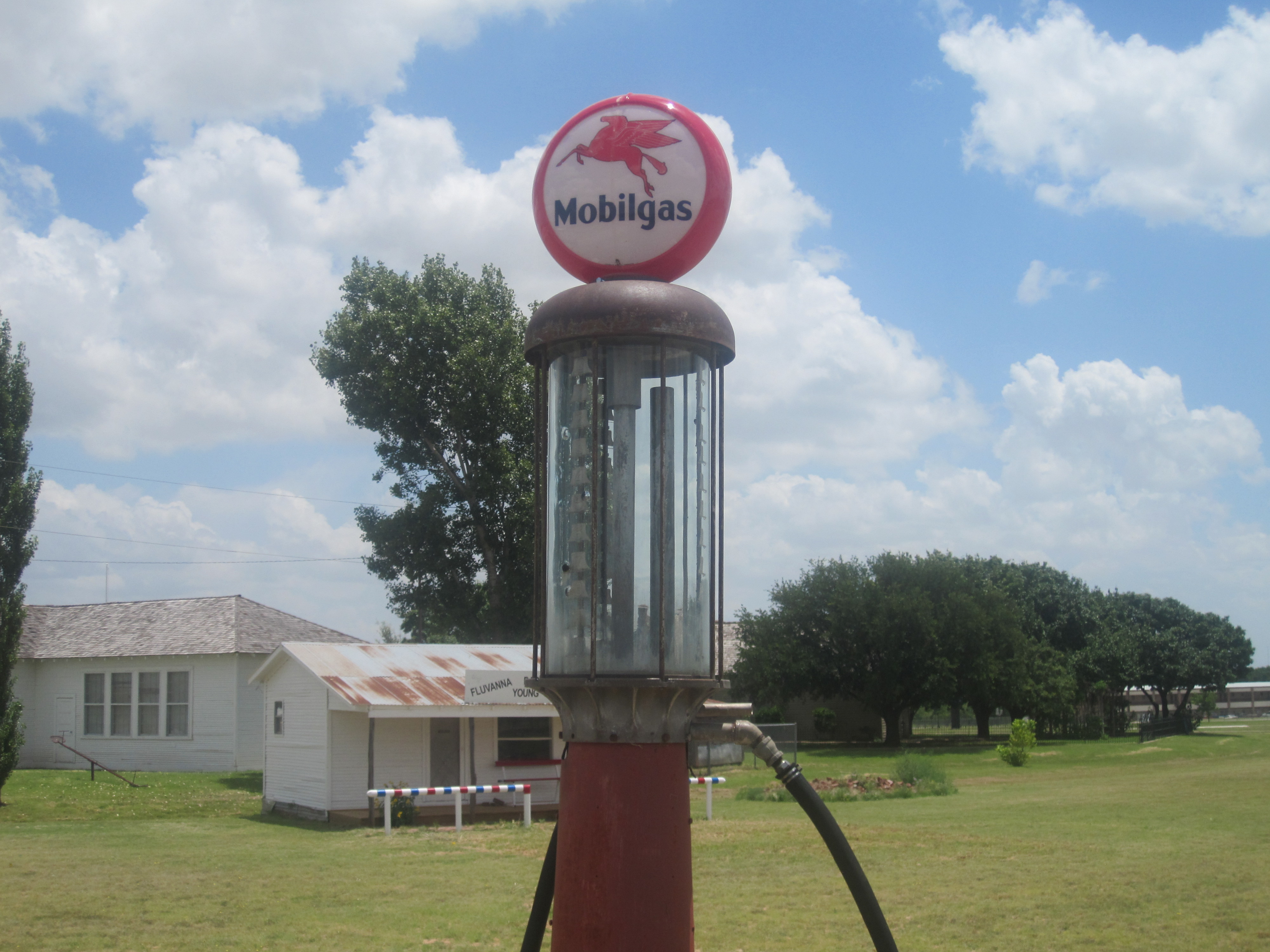
Old Mobilgas pump displayed on the grounds of the Scurry County Coliseum in Snyder, Texas, 2010

Through the years, Mobil was among the largest sellers of gasoline and motor oils in the United States and even held the top spot during the 1940s and much of the 1950s. Various Mobil products during the Socony-Vacuum and Socony-Mobil years included Metro, Mobilgas and Mobilgas Special gasolines; Mobilfuel Diesel, MobilHeat and Mobil-flame heating oil, Mobil Kerosine, Lubrite, Gargoyle, Mobiloil and Mobiloil Special motor oils; Mobilgrease, Mobillubrication, Mobil Upperlube, Mobil Freezone and Permazone antifreezes, Mobilfluid automatic transmission fluid, Mobil Premiere tires, Mobil Stop-Leak, and Mobil Lustrecloth, among many others.

In 1954, Mobil introduced a new and improved Mobilgas Special in response to trends toward new automobiles powered by high-compression engines that demanded higher and higher octane gasolines. The newest formulas of Mobilgas Special were advertised as offering "A Tune-Up in Every Tankful" due to a combination of chemicals known as the "Mobil Power Compound" which was designed to increase power, check pre-ignition ping, correct spark plug misfiring, control stalling and combat gumming up of carburetors. Later Mobil campaigns advertised Mobilgas as the "New Car Gasoline" following extensive testing during the annual Mobilgas Economy Run.

In 1958, Mobil fueled the first transatlantic Boeing 707 commercial flight using its aviation fuel. The flight was operated by Pan Am, and flew from New York City to London.

Mobil's logo in use since the 1960s

In 1962, the gasoline product lines marketed as Mobilgas and Mobilgas Special were rebranded as Mobil Regular and Mobil Premium in a move to emphasize the shortened brand name "Mobil" in promotional efforts, although Mobiloil continued as a single-word term until the 1970s. In select markets, Mobil Special was marketed in select areas as a midgrade gasoline. After a few years of advertising Mobil gasolines as "Megatane"-rated and as "High Energy" gasolines, Mobil began, in 1966, to promote both its Regular and Premium fuels as "Detergent Gasolines", due to the inclusion of additives designed to clean carburetors and various internal engine parts. During the early 1970s, Mobil ran a TV commercial featuring a character known as "Mr. Dirt" to show the ruinous effects that dirt had on automotive engines for which a tank of Mobil Detergent Gasoline could provide a cure and preventive medicine against damage that could lead to costly repairs.

The year 1975 saw Mobil Oil construct Beryl A, the first offshore oil production platform made out of concrete. Mobil credits Beryl A with being the prototype for other concrete-based deepwater oil platforms in the North Sea.

As automakers were switching en masse from carbureted to fuel-injected engines during the early to mid-1980s, and the detergent additives that existed in most available gasolines proved not to be enough to prevent injection clogging, leading to drivability problems, Mobil received accolades from General Motors and other automakers for increasing the detergency of its Super Unleaded gasoline in 1984 to prevent formation or deposit build-ups of the injectors but also remove existing deposits as well in normal driving. At the end of the 1980s Mobil sold its fuel stations in Norway, Sweden, and Denmark to Norsk Hydro, who converted them into Hydro stations.

In October 1983, Howard B. Keck stepped down as a director, while still controlling 18.4 percent of the company, saying he wanted to sell his stake in Superior Oil Company. In late 1983, an "uneasy truce" was reached between two major stockholders, former chairman Howard B. Keck and his sister Willametta Keck Day. Day had in April of that year"led a stockholder revolt" leading to changes in Superior's bylaws, requiring the company's management to consider takeover bids. Howard Keck had opposed the bylaw change. He reversed his position on the bylaws November 1983 and disclosed his intention to sell his stake. Several months before March 1984, the Keck family, which owned a total of about 22 percent of the stock of Superior, approached Mobil Corporation (now part of ExxonMobil) with an offer to sell the family stock.

In March 1984, Mobil announced that it had "secretly" agreed to buy the 22 percent, and would offer the company's remaining stockholders the same price, at $45 a share. In March 1984, Superior Oil was in the process of being acquired by Mobil for $5.7 billion. At that time the company was the nation's largest independent oil producer. The takeover was completed in September 1984, with Superior, then based in Houston, becoming a wholly owned subsidiary of Mobil. It was the fifth-largest oil merger in history, with the combined companies having over $60 billion in combined sales. Among other changes, in February 1985 it was reported that Mobil was planning on selling an unprofitable Idaho gold mine it had acquired when it purchased Superior.

William P. Tavoulareas was President of Mobil Corporation until succeeded by Allen E. Murray in 1984. Mobil moved its headquarters from 150 East 42nd Street, New York City to Fairfax County, Virginia, in 1987. That same year, Mobil sold nearly all of its stations in Western Pennsylvania (including Pittsburgh) to Standard Oil of Ohio (which had just been fully acquired by BP) and terminated franchise contracts with the rest of the stations in the area, withdrawing the Mobil brand from the area for 29 years until a Uni-Mart location in Coraopolis, Pennsylvania, started selling Mobil gasoline in 2016.

== ExxonMobil (1998–present) ==
=== Merger (1998–2000) ===
In 1998, Exxon and Mobil signed a US$73.7 billion merger agreement forming a new company called Exxon Mobil Corp. (ExxonMobil), the largest oil company and the third-largest company in the world. This was the largest corporate merger at that time. At the time of the merger, Exxon was the world's largest energy company while Mobil was the second-largest oil and gas company in the United States. The merger announcement followed shortly after the merge of BP and Amoco, which was the largest industrial merger at the time. Formally, Mobil was acquired by Exxon. Mobil's shareholders received 1.32 Exxon's share for each Mobil's share. As a result, the former Mobil's shareholders receives about 30% in the merged company while the stake of former Exxon's shareholders was about 70%. The head of Exxon, Lee Raymond, remained the chairman and chief executive of the new company and Mobil chief executive Lucio Noto became vice-chairman. The merger of Exxon and Mobil was unique in American history because it reunited the two largest companies of the Standard Oil trust.

The merger was approved in the European Union by the European Commission on September 29, 1999, and by the United States Federal Trade Commission on November 30, 1999. As a condition for the Exxon and Mobil merger, the European Commission ordered to dissolve Mobil's partnership with BP, as also to sell its stake in Aral. As a result, BP acquired all fuels assets, two base oil plants, and a substantial part of the joint venture's finished lubricants business, while ExxonMobil acquired other base oil plants and a part of the finished lubricants business. The stake in Aral was sold to Vega Oel, later acquired by BP. The European Commission also demanded divesting of Mobil's MEGAS and Exxon's 25% stake in the German gas transmission company Thyssengas. MEGAS was acquired by Duke Energy and the stake in Thyssengas was acquired by RWE. The company also divested Exxon's aviation fuel business to BP and Mobil's certain pipeline capacity servicing Gatwick Airport. The Federal Trade Commission required to sell 2,431 gas stations in the Northeast and Mid-Atlantic (1,740), California (360), Texas (319), and Guam (12). In addition, ExxonMobil should sell its Benicia Refinery in California, terminal operations in Boston, the Washington, D.C. area and Guam, interest in the Colonial pipeline, Mobil's interest in the Trans-Alaska Pipeline System, Exxon's jet turbine oil business, and give-up the option to buy Tosco Corporation gas stations. The Benicia Refinery and 340 Exxon-branded stations in California were bought by Valero Energy Corporation in 2000.

=== Lee Raymond era (2001–2005) ===
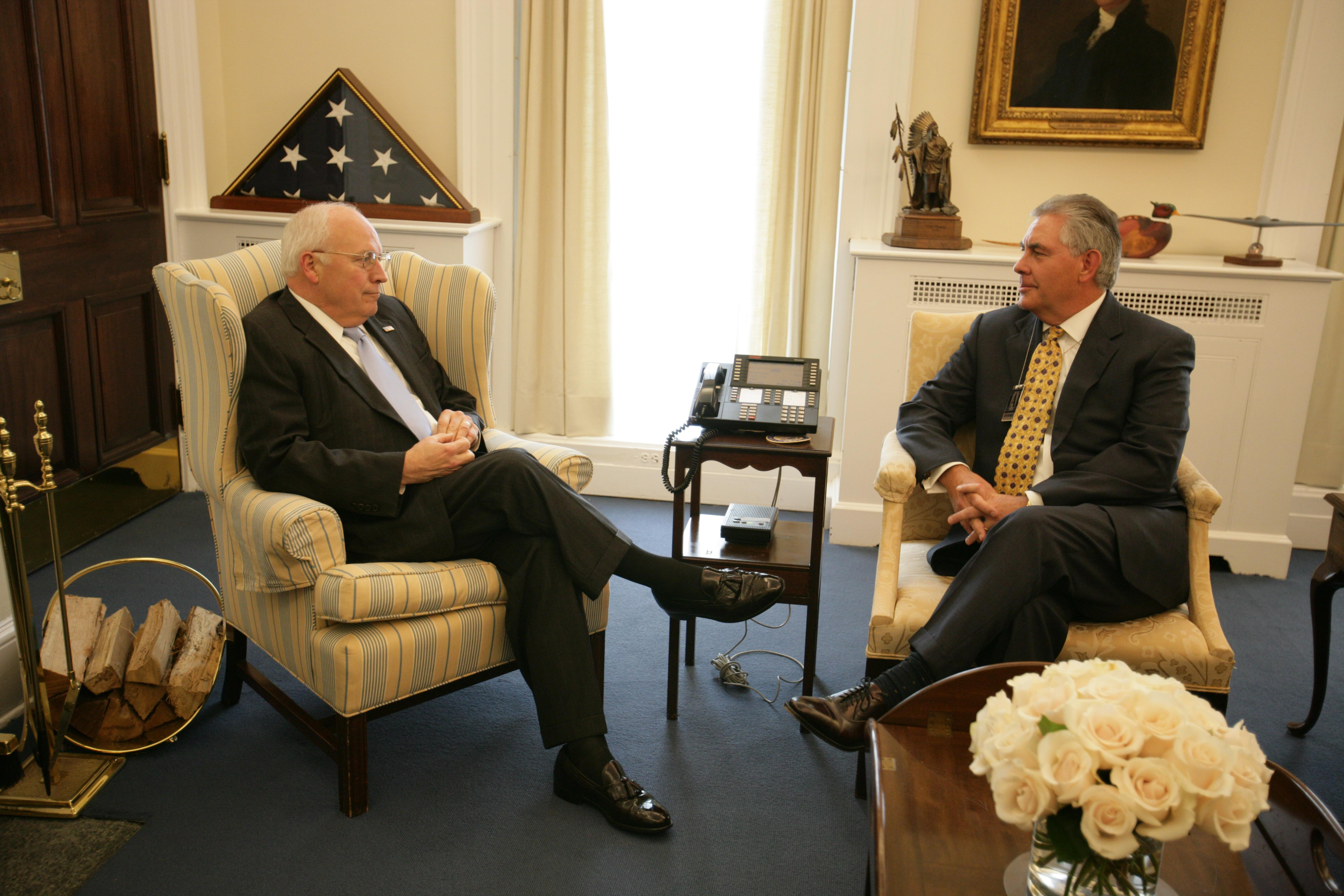
ExxonMobil Chairman Rex Tillerson with Vice President Dick Cheney, 2007

In the late 1990s and early 2000s, ExxonMobil has received a lot of criticism along with BP, China National Petroleum Corporation, Shell, and Lukoil, for increasing oil production facilities in the Rumaila oil field and West Qurna Field following the Iraqi government's lack of power and instability resulting from the Iraq War. ExxonMobil alone produces 2,325,000 bpd or $967,432,500 per year of gross revenue in Iraq to maintain low prices. This practice is considered to be beneficial to the big oil consumer countries and allows Exxon to produce higher profit crude oil products such as plastic, fertilizer, medication, lubricant, and clothing.

In 2002, the company sold its stake in the Cerrejón coal mine in Colombia, and copper-mining business in Chile. At the same time, it renewed its interest in oil shale by developing the ExxonMobil Electrofrac in-situ extraction process. In 2014, the Bureau of Land Management approved their research and development project in Rio Blanco County, Colorado. However, in November 2015 the company relinquished its federal research, development and demonstration lease. In 2009, ExxonMobil phased-out coal mining by selling its last operational coal mine in the United States.

=== Rex Tillerson as CEO (2006–2016) ===
The current Exxon logo, in use since 2014

ExxonMobil announced that Rex Tillerson would replace Raymond as CEO of the company. With 2005's $36 billion net income being a year of record profits in both company history as well as world history up to that point, ExxonMobil gave Raymond a $400 million retirement package, described as being among history's most generous. Raymond's package included pensions from the company, stock options, a $1 million consulting deal, two years of home security, personal security, a car and driver, and use of a private jet. Raymond's retirement package was widely criticized as being an example of the increasing the wealth gap in the United States, especially during a time where oil prices were at high levels, though the company defended its generous retirement package by explaining that Lee's leadership helped increase ExxonMobil's stock price by 500% and become the largest oil company in the world.

In 2008, ExxonMobil started to phase-out from the United States direct-served retail market by selling its service stations. The usage of Exxon and Mobil brands was franchised to the new owners.

In 2010, ExxonMobil bought XTO Energy, the company focused on development and production of unconventional resources.

In 2011, ExxonMobil started a strategic cooperation with Russian oil company Rosneft to develop the East-Prinovozemelsky field in the Kara Sea and the Tuapse field in the Black Sea. In 2012, ExxonMobil concluded an agreement with Rosneft to assess possibilities to produce tight oil from Bazhenov and Achimov formations in Western Siberia. In 2018, due to international sanctions imposed against Russia and Rosneft, ExxonMobil announces that it will end these joint ventures with Rosneft, but will continue the Sakhalin-I project. The company estimates it would cost about $200 million after tax.

In 2012, ExxonMobil started a coalbed methane development in Australia, but withdrew from the project in 2014.

In 2012, ExxonMobil confirmed a deal for production and exploration activities in the Kurdistan region of Iraq.

In November 2013, ExxonMobil agreed to sell its majority stakes in a Hong Kong-based utility and power storage firm, Castle Peak Co Ltd, for a total of $3.4 billion, to CLP Holdings.

In 2014, ExxonMobil had two "non-monetary" asset swap deals with LINN Energy LLC. In these transactions, ExxonMobil gave to LINN interests in the South Belridge and Hugoton gas fields in the exchange of assets in the Permian Basin in Texas and the Delaware Basin in New Mexico.

On October 9, 2014, the International Centre for Settlement of Investment Disputes awarded ExxonMobil $1.6 billion in the case the company had brought against the Venezuelan government. ExxonMobil alleged that the Venezuelan government illegally expropriated its Venezuelan assets in 2007 and paid unfair compensation.

In September 2016, the Securities and Exchange Commission contacted ExxonMobil, questioning why (unlike some other companies) they had not yet started writing down the value of their oil reserves, given that much may have to remain in the ground to comply with future climate change legislation. Mark Carney has expressed concerns about the industry's "stranded assets". In October 2016, ExxonMobil conceded it may need to declare a lower value for its in-ground oil, and that it might write down about one-fifth of its reserves.

Also in September 2016, ExxonMobil successfully asked a U.S. federal court to lift the trademark injunction that banned it from using the Esso brand in various U.S. states. By this time, as a result of numerous mergers and rebranding, the remaining Standard Oil companies that previously objected to the Esso name had been acquired by BP. ExxonMobil cited trademark surveys in which there was no longer possible confusion with the Esso name as it was more than seven decades before. BP also had no objection to lifting the ban. ExxonMobil did not specify whether they would now open new stations in the U.S. under the Esso name; they were primarily concerned about the additional expenses of having separate marketing, letterheads, packaging, and other materials that omit "Esso".

=== Early years under Darren Woods (2017–2020) ===
On December 13, 2016, Tillerson was nominated as Secretary of State by President-elect Donald Trump. ExxonMobil later announced that Darren Woods would replace Tillerson as CEO and Chairman. A longtime employee of the company, Woods served as one of ExxonMobil's senior vice presidents immediately prior to his accession.

One of the first events under Woods' tenure was the revelation that Infineum, a joint venture of ExxonMobil and Royal Dutch Shell headquartered in England, conducted business with Iran, Syria, and Sudan while those states were under US sanctions. ExxonMobil representatives said that because Infineum was based in Europe and the transactions did not involve any U.S. employees, this did not violate the sanctions.

In April 2017, Trump's administration denied a request from ExxonMobil to allow it to resume oil drilling in Russia. Trump's denial was supported US Representative Adam Schiff, a Democrat from California, said that the "Treasury Department should reject any waiver from sanctions which would allow ExxonMobil or any other company to resume business with prohibited Russian entities." Three months later, ExxonMobil filed a lawsuit against the Trump administration challenging the finding that the company violated sanctions imposed on Russia. William Holbrook, a company spokesman, said that the ExxonMobil had followed "clear guidance from the White House and Treasury Department when its representatives signed [in May 2014] documents involving ongoing oil and gas activities in Russia with Rosneft".

In 2018, ExxonMobil created Exxchange, an online site where the company posts content in support of "smarter regulations" with regard to the oil and gas business and in defense of oil and gas jobs. The site attracted considerable controversy targeted towards both ExxonMobil and PR firm Edelman for their activities described by many as climate change denial.

In June 2019, following Washington D.C.'s increased sanctions on Iran, a rocket landed near the Iraqi headquarters of ExxonMobil, Shell, and Eni. It came after two separate attacks on United States Military bases in Iraq and one week after two oil tankers being hit by a 'flying object' in the Gulf of Oman. The U.S. Navy's investigation has led to reasonable suspicion to believe Tehran's connection to the attacks.

ExxonMobil considered a merger with rival Chevron in 2020 during the early stages of the COVID-19 pandemic that drove oil demand sharply down. It would have been one of the biggest corporate mergers in history, and a combined ExxonMobil and Chevron would have been the second biggest oil company in the world.

In August 2020, Exxonmobil was removed from the Dow Jones Industrial Average and replaced by software corporation Salesforce, reflecting a change of time in which oil companies have lost much of their value and influence. ExxonMobil, through either its current iteration or one of its deviants, has been in some form part of the Dow 30 since 1928.

In October 2020, ExxonMobil announced that it will cut over 1,600 jobs in Europe as a result of the COVID-19 pandemic. According to the company, the job cuts are necessary in order to produce cost cuts and they will be implemented by the end of 2021. The number of job cuts represents one-tenth of the company's workforce, which was estimated at nearly 75,000 by the end of 2019.

ExxonMobil
(@exxonmobil)
tweeted:

We are aware of the President’s statement regarding a hypothetical call with our CEO...and just so we’re all clear, it never happened.

October 19, 2020

Also in October 2020, ExxonMobil gained attention for its lack of donations to Donald Trump's 2020 reelection campaign. During a rally in Tucson, Arizona, Trump commented that he would be able to call CEO Darren Woods and obtain a $25 million donation from the company in exchange for drilling permits. While the company's political action committee donated to Trump's inauguration previously and regularly donates to the National Republican Senatorial Committee and other GOP-supporting organizations, neither ExxonMobil nor Woods donated to Donald Trump. After the rally, the company stated on Twitter that a "hypothetical" call between Trump and Woods never happened. The oil giant's employees additionally donated to Trump's then-opponent Joe Biden and his campaign more than they donated to Trump.

=== Rising tensions with Russia, record profits, and restructurings (2021–present) ===
In January 2021, ExxonMobil started a pilot program with Crusoe Energy Systems to also divert its flare gas into generators producing electricity to power shipping containers full of bitcoin miners in the Bakken region of North Dakota (which it expanded the following July), and that Crusoe has stated reduces carbon dioxide equivalent emissions by 63 percent as compared with continued flaring. In 2021 and 2022, an index constructed by researchers at the University of Cambridge showed that bitcoin mining consumed more electricity during the course of the year than the entire nations of Argentina (a G20 country) and the Netherlands. In December 2021, ExxonMobil announced it was committing to net-zero Scope I and Scope II emissions from its Permian Basin emissions by 2030. Later, in January 2022, ExxonMobil additionally announced it was going to meet net zero emissions for Scope I and Scope II emissions across its entire business by 2050. Despite these commitments, the company was criticized for not fully committing to net zero Scope III emissions, leading to criticism from environmentalists.

In January 2022, ExxonMobil stated that it was consolidating and restructuring certain elements of its business, the most prominent being the consolidation of its chemical and refinery sectors. ExxonMobil additionally formalized the creation of a new low-carbon sector, which will handle the company's biofuel and carbon capture ventures. Concurrently, the company announced it would be closing its headquarters in Irving, Texas, a suburb of Dallas, and moving to its recently opened campus in the Houston suburb of Spring. The company released its 2021 Q4 Earnings early the next day on February 1, recording a 3-month profit of US$8.9 Billion, jumping over 80%. ExxonMobil that day additionally announced that both its total debt was now around pre-pandemic levels, and it would begin buying back some of its shares.

On March 1, 2022, following BP and Shell's decisions to exit the Russian market amid Russian president Vladimir Putin's invasion of Ukraine, ExxonMobil announced it was severing all ties with Russia, exiting the Sakhalin-I project (which it had been involved with since 2001 though a special subsidiary) and halting all new investments in Russia. In a company statement, ExxonMobil detailed that it stands with the Ukrainian people "as they seek to defend their freedom and determine their own future as a nation". ExxonMobil concurrently announced it would increase investments into blue hydrogen and carbon capture and storage in its Baytown, Texas refinery and a hydrogen production facility in Southampton, UK. The major oil and gas companies, including ExxonMobil, reported sharp rises in interim revenues and profits. When Russia attempted to ban the company from leaving Sakhalin-I in response to the invasion, ExxonMobil launched a lawsuit against the Government of Russia seeking to allow it to leave the country and Sakhalin. During a public conference call held after ExxonMobil released its third quarter earnings for 2022, Woods stated that ExxonMobil had safely completed its exit from Sakhalin, though Woods maintained that ExxonMobil's rights had been violated by the Russian government.

2022 saw continued rising profits for ExxonMobil, as their second quarter earnings totaled to $17.6 billion in profit, and $19.66 billion for the third quarter, which Woods attributed mostly to market conditions. The company attained wide scrutiny for the higher profits throughout 2022 for high gas prices, especially from US President Joe Biden, who claimed that the oil giant was "making more money than God". Analysts speculate that both ExxonMobil and fellow Standard Oil descendant Chevron will earn over $100 billion in profit each by the end of 2022.

ExxonMobil also saw the sales of some of its assets in 2022, in addition to its Irving campus. In May, Exxon sold its Barnett Shale holdings to subsidiaries of BKV Corporation for $750 million, with additional payments based on the price of natural gas. October saw Exxon both finalize plans to sell its Billings Refinery to Par Pacific Holdings for $310 million, itself seen as a continuation of the company reducing its refining footprint, and the joint sale of its California oil wells with Shell to a German conglomerate. In November, Exxon sold its share in an offshore oil field off the coast of Santa Barbara, California, which had been problematic for the company since a 2015 oil spill; the company took a $2 billion loss on the sale.

Despite its sales of assets, ExxonMobil's upstream department continued to make significant discoveries in Guyana. April saw the company discover three new fields which total to about 11 billion new barrels of oil discovered. In September 2022, Exxon made two more discoveries off the coast of Guyana. Since Exxon's initial entry into Guyana in 2015, the South American country has been the home of one third of all oil discoveries made between then and now. In November 2022, Exxon also made Angola's first oil discovery in nearly 20 years, and the first on the African continent in 10 years. Adding to its increased focus on the Americas and Africa, ExxonMobil sold Esso Thailand to Bangchak Corporation in January 2023 for US$603 million, though the final sale price will be determined based on Esso Thailand's last quarterly earnings. The sale to Bangchak will rebrand all Esso stations in Thailand to Bangchak, and also cede ownership of an oil refinery in Sriracha and select distribution facilities to Bangchak.

In September 2022, European Commission chief Ursula von der Leyen announced that the major gas, coal, and oil companies would have to pay a windfall tax, an extra levy imposed by a government on a company that benefited from something they were not responsible for. In ExxonMobil's case, that was the Russian invasion of Ukraine, and their windfall tax was supposed to be 33% of their profits. ExxonMobil responded by filing suit against the EU in an attempt to force the bloc to scrap this windfall tax.

ExxonMobil, despite earlier sales in shale gas assets, experienced interest in 2023 in expanding its holdings in the Permian Basin. In April of that year, news broke that ExxonMobil was considering acquiring Pioneer Natural Resources, a deal which would make it the largest shale gas producer in the Permian. Some, but not all analysts, expect that ExxonMobil's interest in Pioneer could cause a larger wave of large US shale gas companies to consolidate or be acquired by other firms. The company announced it would acquire Pioneer on October 11, 2023, in a $59.5 billion all-stock deal, the largest of the energy industry in nearly 20 years. Woods commented that the deal closed "relatively quickly" and that the opportunity for both companies was notably big.

ExxonMobil's Low Carbon Solutions division also began exploring hydrogen-related energy projects in the 2020s, including furthering the development of turning hydrogen into gasoline substitutes. The company further looked into lobbying the Biden administration into providing subsidies towards hydrogen projects under recent climate-related laws passed by Biden, mostly beginning in 2023.

The company's shift of strategy towards the Americas led to a 2024 pullout of Equatorial Guinea and the continuance of company exploration in waters offshore of Essequibo, which is currently disputed territory between Guyana and Venezuela. ExxonMobil announced plans to drill two wells in Essequibo waters, which resulted in a disapproving response from Venezuela's government under President Nicolás Maduro, risking further escalation of tensions between the two countries.

==== Relationships with activist investors ====
Since 2021, the American oil giant engaged with climate-focused activist investors as part of a trend noted by the U.S. Securities and Exchange Commission. The first and so far only major loss that ExxonMobil took was in 2021, where hedge fund Engine No. 1 ousted three ExxonMobil directors, namely former MetLife CEO Steven Kandarian, former IBM CEO Samuel Palmisano, and former Petronas CEO Wan Zulkiflee, replacing them with Engine No. 1 nominees Kaisa Hietala of Neste, Gregory J. Goff of Marathon Petroleum, and Andy Karsner of both Google and the US Department of Energy.

Activist investor efforts failed, though, at the 2022 and 2023 annual meetings for the company, though two firms, Follow This and Arjuna Capital, were noted in early 2024 as being backers for climate petitions at that year's meeting. In response, in January 2024, ExxonMobil filed suit against both firms to block their efforts, the first time the company had taken activist investors to court. Petitioning courts in its home state of Texas to exclude Scope 3 emission proposals, the company released a statement to BBC News arguing that shareholders of the company ultimately would be harmed by the flood of proposals.

== Leadership ==
=== President ===
1. Henry Flagler, 1882–1883
2. James McGee, 1883–1885
3. Paul Babcock Jr., 1885–1892
4. Henry Flagler, 1892–1899
5. John D. Rockefeller, 1899–1911
6. John D. Archbold, 1911–1916
7. Alfred C. Bedford, 1916–1917
8. Walter C. Teagle, 1917–1937
9. William S. Farish II, 1937–1942
10. Ralph W. Gallagher, 1943–1944
11. Eugene Holman, 1944–1953
12. Monroe J. Rathbone II, 1954–1963
13. Michael L. Haider, 1963–1965
14. J. Kenneth Jamieson, 1965–1969
15. Milo M. Brisco, 1969–1972
16. Clifton C. Garvin Jr, 1972–1975
17. Howard C. Kauffmann, 1975–1985
18. Lawrence G. Rawl, 1985–1987
19. Lee R. Raymond, 1987–1993
20. Charles R. Sitter, 1993–1996
21. Lee R. Raymond, 1996–2004
22. Rex W. Tillerson, 2004–2015
23. Darren W. Woods, 2016–

=== Chairman of the Board ===
1. Alfred C. Bedford, 1917–1925
2. George H. Jones, 1925–1928
3. William S. Farish II, 1933–1937
4. Walter C. Teagle, 1937–1942
5. Ralph W. Gallagher, 1942–1943, 1944–1945
6. Frank W. Abrams, 1946–1953
7. Eugene Holman, 1954–1960
8. Leo D. Welch, 1960–1963
9. Monroe J. Rathbone II, 1963–1965
10. Michael L. Haider, 1965–1969
11. J. Kenneth Jamieson, 1969–1975
12. Clifton C. Garvin Jr, 1975–1986
13. Lawrence G. Rawl, 1987–1993
14. Lee R. Raymond, 1993–2005
15. Rex W. Tillerson, 2006–2016
16. Darren W. Woods, 2017–

== Present usage of Exxon and Mobil ==
Exxon's logo since 2016

ExxonMobil today retains usage of both Exxon and Mobil as brands. Exxon is exclusively used at fuel stations within the United States, and its logo has been redesigned since so that all letters except for the leading "E" are in lowercase, while the double X has been retained. Mobil is also used within the United States, though Mobil is also used in several other countries, and is the dominant brand name for the company worldwide especially when factoring in the numerous auto sponsorships that ExxonMobil has entered for their Mobil 1 brand of synthetic motor oil. Mobil's logo has remained unchanged.
