= Milo M. Brisco =

American oilman

- Born: November 7, 1912; Maud, Oklahoma
- Died: March 28, 2000 (aged 87); Palm Beach Gardens, Florida
- Education: University of Oklahoma
- Spouse: Lucile Frances Solomon (m. 1940)

15th President of the Standard Oil Company (New Jersey)
- In office October 1, 1969 – October 31, 1972
- Preceded by: John Kenneth Jamieson
- Succeeded by: Clifton C. Garvin

Milo Martin "Mike" Brisco (November 7, 1912 – March 28, 2000) was an American oilman who served as the 10th president of Standard Oil of New Jersey (now ExxonMobil). Brisco's career began in 1935 and for the next 30 years he worked for several of Standard's affiliate companies in South America. In 1966 he was elected a director of Standard, and in 1967 was appointed a vice-president. On October 1, 1969, Brisco was appointed president of Standard and held the position until his retirement on October 31, 1972.

== Biography ==
Milo Martin Brisco was born in Maud, Oklahoma, on November 7, 1912, to John Marion Brisco (1879–1919) and Mattie Moss. Milo grew up in Seminole, Oklahoma, and was present during the town's oil boom that began in 1926. After high school he studied at the University of Oklahoma from 1930 to 1934, though it is unclear whether he graduated. In 1935, Brisco joined the Tropical Oil Company and remained with the company until 1946. From 1946 to 1948 he worked for the Andian National Corporation. In 1948 he joined in the International Petroleum Company, where he would remain through 1966. From 1955 to 1957 he served as the president of the Andian National Corporation and Esso Colombiana. In 1957 he was elected a director of International Petroleum, and later that year appointed an executive vice-president. At this time, he returned from South America to the United States and was based in Coral Gables, Florida, where International had its headquarters. He became International's president in 1961, succeeding John Kenneth Jamieson, who became a vice-president of Humble Oil.

On February 1, 1966, Brisco was elected a director of Standard Oil of New Jersey, and on May 17, 1967, was appointed a vice-president. At a meeting of Standard's board of directors on August 27, 1969, J. K. Jamieson was elected chairman of the board and Brisco was appointed Jamieson's replacement as president. The appointments became effective on October 1. Brisco took early retirement and stepped down from the presidency on October 31, 1972, at age 60, and retired from the board on November 1.

During his career, Brisco also served as a director of the First National City Bank, First National City Corporation, and International Executive Service Corps, and was on the board of governors of the United Way of America. He was a member of the American Institute of Mining, Metallurgical, and Petroleum Engineers, Council on Foreign Relations, Brookings Institution, Phi Delta Theta, and the Episcopal Church. Brisco belonged to the Sleepy Hollow Country Club, Winged Foot Golf Club, and Economic Club of New York.

On November 1, 1940, Brisco married Lucile Frances "Sue" Solomon (1912–1983) at St. Mark's Episcopal Church in Seminole, Oklahoma. They had two daughters, Susan Blair (Mrs. Thomas A. Larson) and Martha Frances (Mrs. William E. Dee III). Brisco died on March 28, 2000, in Palm Beach Gardens at age 87 after he was involved in a car crash on Northlake Boulevard. His funeral was held at St. Mark's Episcopal Church in Fort Lauderdale on April 1, and he was entombed with his late wife at Hillcrest Memorial Gardens in Fort Pierce.
