= Alfred Cotton Bedford =

President of the Standard Oil Company of New Jersey

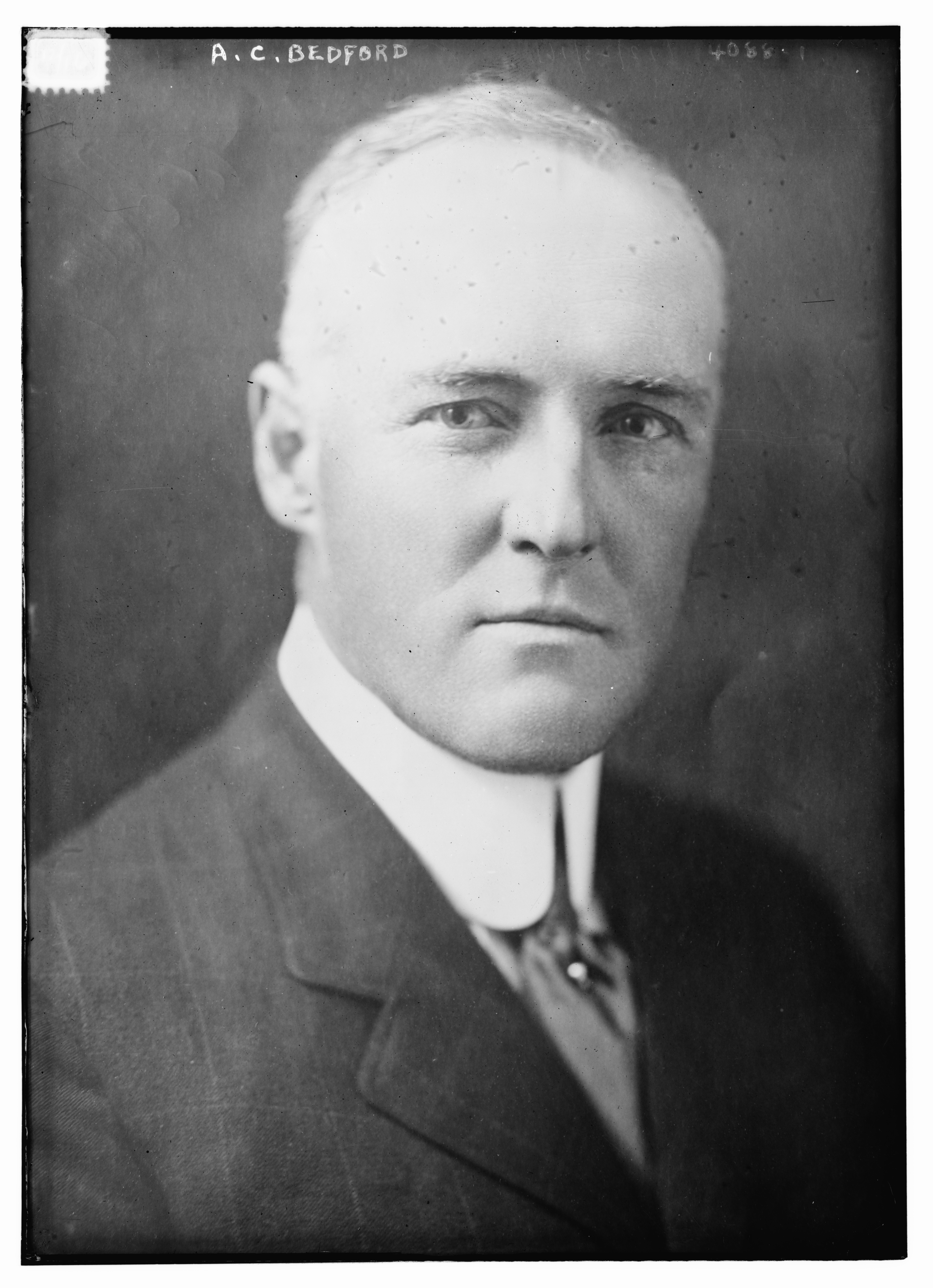
- Born: November 5, 1863; Brooklyn, New York State
- Died: September 21, 1925 (aged 61); Brooklyn, New York City
- Burial place: Green-Wood Cemetery
- Spouse: Edith Kinsman Clark (m. 1890)

7th President of the Standard Oil Company (New Jersey)
- In office December 22, 1916 – November 25, 1917
- Preceded by: John D. Archbold
- Succeeded by: Walter C. Teagle

1st Chairman of the Standard Oil Company (New Jersey)
- In office November 25, 1917 – September 21, 1925
- Succeeded by: George H. Jones

Alfred Cotton Bedford (November 5, 1863 – September 21, 1925) was president of the Standard Oil Company of New Jersey starting on December 22, 1916, to November 15, 1917. He served as chairman of the board of Standard Oil of New Jersey from November 15, 1917, to September 21, 1925.

== Biography ==
He was born on November 5, 1863, in Brooklyn, New York state to Alfred Bedford of England. He married Edith Kinsman Clark on January 8, 1890, and had Alfred Cotton Bedford Jr.

He was promoted from treasurer to president of the Standard Oil Company of New Jersey starting on December 22, 1916. He was made chairman of the board on November 15, 1917, and Walter Clark Teagle took over the presidency.

He received the Commandant of the Legion medal of France in 1922.

He died on September 21, 1925. He left an estate of $3,000,000 (equivalent to $55,075,901 in 2025). He was buried in Green-Wood Cemetery in Brooklyn, New York. His widow died in 1944.

== Publications ==
- Problems Confronting the Petroleum Industry
