= Monroe Jackson Rathbone II =

American businessman

12th President of the Standard Oil Company (New Jersey)
- In office January 1, 1954 – March 31, 1963
- Preceded by: Eugene Holman
- Succeeded by: Michael L. Haider

9th Chairman of the Standard Oil Company (New Jersey)
- In office April 1, 1963 – February 28, 1965
- Preceded by: Leo D. Welch
- Succeeded by: Michael L. Haider

Personal details
- Born: March 1, 1900 Parkersburg, West Virginia, U.S.
- Died: August 2, 1976 (aged 76) Baton Rouge, Louisiana, U.S.
- Spouse: Eleanor Groves (m. 1922)
- Children: 2
- Relatives: Jackson Rathbone (great-grandson)
- Education: Lehigh University (BS, 1921)
- Military career
- Allegiance: United States
- Branch: United States Army
- Service years: 1918–1919
- Rank: Second Lieutenant

Monroe Jackson Rathbone II (March 1, 1900 – August 2, 1976) was an American businessman who was the chairman, president, and CEO of Standard Oil of New Jersey (now the Exxon Corporation).

== Early life and education ==
Rathbone was born in Parkersburg, West Virginia, the son of Ida Virginia (née Welch) and Monroe Jackson Rathbone. A member of the Rathbone family, he graduated from Parkersburg High School in 1918.

Rathbone received a Bachelor of Science in chemical engineering from Lehigh University in 1921. A building at Lehigh University, Rathbone Hall, is named after him. He established an endowment fund for International Relations, and was a member of Lehigh’s Board of Trustees from 1949 until his death, serving as chairman from 1957 until 1973. In addition to an honorary doctorate from Lehigh, he received honorary degrees from Lafayette College, Pace College, West Virginia University, Marietta College, and Chattanooga University.

== Business career ==
Rathbone joined Standard Oil of New Jersey in 1921 as a design engineer at the Baton Rouge refinery of Standard Oil of Louisiana. In 1923, he was promoted to the operations division of Louisiana Standard as an experimental engineer. In 1924, he was named assistant to the general superintendent. In 1926, he became general superintendent, then assistant general manager and vice president. In 1944, he was appointed president and director of Standard 's new Esso Division. In 1949, he was named to the board of directors of the parent Standard Oil Company. In 1953, Rathbone was named president of Standard Oil of New Jersey, and in 1959 he was named CEO. In 1962, he was elected chairman of the board of directors of Standard Oil of New Jersey. He retired in 1965.

He served on the boards of directors for many other major corporations, including Bethlehem Steel, American Telephone and Telegraph, and Prudential Insurance, and on such private groups as the Deafness Research Foundation, the National Fund for Medical Education, and the Council for Financial Aid to Education. He was active in the Lehigh Alumni Association, serving as board chairman and president; was board chairman of the American Petroleum Institute and a director of Junior Achievement. During World War II, he served on President Roosevelt's Business Council.

== Origins of OPEC ==
In the mid twentieth century, the Seven Sisters controlled global oil production, distribution, and pricing through joint consortia by establishing 50/50 profit-sharing agreements with producing countries, and setting "posted prices" for predictable payments. In February 1959, these companies unilaterally cut posted oil prices by about 10%, angering Venezuela and Middle Eastern governments. In August 1960 Rathbone further cut Middle Eastern crude prices again by 10-14 cents per barrel despite warnings from his own experts. Leaders of oil producing countries, Juan Pablo Pérez Alfonzo and Abdullah Tariki, had allied in 1959, and within hours of Rathbone's price cut they met in Baghdad, with representatives from Iran, Iraq, Kuwait, Saudi Arabia, and Venezuela, and officially formed OPEC to coordinate petroleum policies and protect their collective interests.

== Personal life ==
Rathbone was married in 1922 to Eleanor Groves, and had two children - Eleanor Virginia and Dr. Monroe Jackson Rathbone III. Jackson Rathbone is Rathbone's great-grandson.

A resident of Summit, New Jersey, Rathbone maintained a country home near Baton Rouge, Louisiana.

Rathbone died at the age of 76 on August 2, 1976, at Baton Rouge General Hospital.
