= Walter C. Teagle =

American oilman (1878–1962)

Walter Clark Teagle
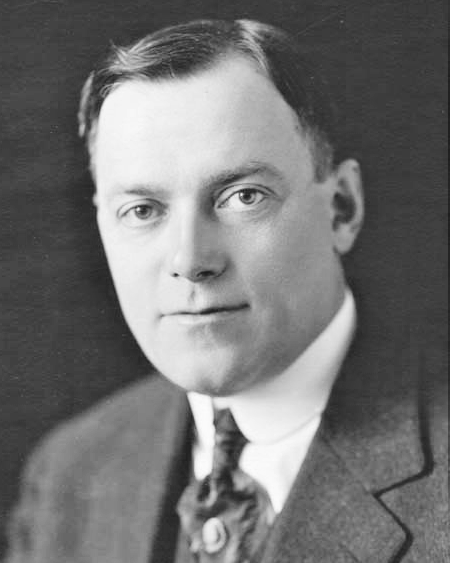

8th President of the Standard Oil Company (New Jersey)
- In office November 15, 1917 – June 1, 1937
- Preceded by: Alfred C. Bedford
- Succeeded by: William S. Farish II

4th Chairman of the Standard Oil Company (New Jersey)
- In office June 1, 1937 – November 30, 1942
- Preceded by: William S. Farish II
- Succeeded by: Ralph W. Gallagher

Personal details
- Born: May 1, 1878 Cleveland, Ohio
- Died: January 9, 1962 (aged 83) Byram, Connecticut
- Resting place: Putnam Cemetery
- Spouses: Edith Castle Murray (m. 1903; died 1908) Rowena Bayliss Lee (m. 1911)
- Education: Cornell University (BS, 1900)

Walter Clark Teagle (May 1, 1878 – January 9, 1962) was president of Standard Oil Company of New Jersey from 1917 to 1937 and was chairman of the board from 1937 to 1942. He was responsible for leading Standard Oil to the forefront of the oil industry and significantly expanding the company's presence in the petrochemical field. In 1923, Cornell University announced that Teagle was their highest salaried graduate. He served as vice president of the Cornell Club of New York and on a variety of committees.

== Biography ==
He was born in Cleveland, Ohio on May 1, 1878 into a wealthy oil family. Teagle was the grandson of Maurice B. Clark, one of John D. Rockefeller's former partners in Standard Oil. Teagle's father, John Teagle, headed Scofield, Shurmer and Teagle, Standard Oil's competitor in Cleveland.

Teagle entered Cornell University with the class of 1900, but graduated early in 1899 with a B.S. in chemistry. As a student, Teagle was said to have "managed everything," serving as manager for two publications, the football team, class politics, and as chair of the committees for class promenades and cotillions. He was a member of the Quill and Dagger society and Alpha Delta Phi.

In 1901, Standard Oil bought out the Teagle family refinery, and placed Teagle in charge. Two years later, he joined the export committee of Standard Oil of New Jersey, traveling around the world for the next seven and a half years. He became a director of Standard Oil in 1910, and a vice president shortly thereafter. During this time, he acquired operations in Venezuela and Iran. At the age of 39, Teagle became the youngest president of a Standard Oil company, then known as Esso, when he became president for Standard Oil of New Jersey; since 1972, it has been known as Exxon. Under his leadership, Standard Oil of New Jersey became the world's largest oil producer, increasing market share from 2% to 11.5%. He helped pioneer worker representation on refinery councils and the eight-hour workday. From ca. April 1915 till December 1917 he was president of the International Petroleum Company (Canada), then newly formed as the consolidation of 4 large Peruvian oil production and marketing companies serving the entire west coast of South America. International Petroleum was controlled by Imperial Oil Co. of Canada, a subsidiary of the Standard of New Jersey. Peru was not an important factor in the world oil market at the time.

Teagle married twice, to Edith Murray on October 3, 1903, and after her death, to Rowena Lee in 1910. Following Standard Oil house counsel Virgil Kline, who had earlier won cases against Standard for his father's firm, Teagle built a summer house in Blue Hill, Maine.

He served as a trustee for Cornell University from 1924 to 1954 and donating funds for the Teagle Hall athletic building. Teagle has been accused of contributing to Nazi Germany during World War II through his involvement with German chemical company IG Farben. As a director of IG Farben's American subsidiary, he allied Standard Oil with the German company and conducted research jointly. Standard Oil supplied information to IG Farben on how to manufacture tetraethyl lead and synthetic rubber, both critical resources to the war effort. In 1938, under Teagle's leadership, Standard Oil and its British subsidiaries supplied five hundred tons of tetraethyl lead to Germany's Luftwaffe. Germany had very few industrial resources of its own, and without this octane booster for its aviation gas, the Luftwaffe would have been practically grounded. At the time tetraethyl lead was a rare and highly controlled commodity and it is unlikely Germany would have been able to find another source for it. Had Teagle not arranged such a massive transfer of the substance to the Luftwaffe, it is likely that the second World War would have been postponed for several years. By 1934, Standard Oil, under Teagle, also supplied Japan with large quantities of this critical aviation gas component, including to Japanese forces in Japan-occupied Manchuria. In a memorandum dated October 24, 1934, Chief of the Division of Far Eastern Affairs Stanley K. Hornbeck discussed his meeting with Teagle to U.S. President Franklin D. Roosevelt, and how Teagle was also uncooperative with U.S. recommendations and was given special treatment by the Japanese government, which made him and his company less subjected to Japan's national businesses regulations than they did other companies. Hornbeck noted in the memorandum that as a result of Teagle's business dealings with Japan, "petroleum products now imported into Japan is of American origin."

When America entered the war a few years later, it was desperately short of rubber because Standard Oil, again under Teagle's leadership, refused to produce any synthetic rubber for the American military, because Teagle had transferred the patent rights for synthetic rubber to IG Farben, a German company. Because of the patents it had sold to Germany, Standard Oil also interfered with America's production of synthetic ammonia (for use in explosives), acetic acid (another crucial war material), and methanol (another fuel additive). Standard and Teagle, again protecting IG Farben's patents, had also worked to prevent the US military from obtaining paraflow, a crucial high-altitude lubricant used in fighters and bombers.

Though Teagle himself had two sons in the Army Air Force, Standard Oil, through its subsidiaries, continued to supply Germany with oil. Faced with a United States Department of Justice investigation, Teagle convinced President Franklin D. Roosevelt that a suit would hurt the war effort, instead choosing to pay an out-of-court fine. The result was a fall in public favor for Standard Oil and the resignation of Teagle in 1942, one year short of the mandatory retirement age. He was replaced by Ralph W. Gallagher.

Despite the settlement, for the duration of the Second World War, Standard Oil, under deals Teagle had overseen, continued to supply Nazi Germany with oil. The shipments went through Spain, Vichy France's colonies in the West Indies, and Switzerland. Standard's oil shipments from the United States to Spain were briefly halted in January 1944 due to American public pressure, then began again in May 1944. Spain, meanwhile, was shipping 48,000 tons a month of American oil to Germany. Shortly after the war in Germany ended in May 1945, Teagle underwent patent suit trial, which resulted in him testifying about his business dealings with Nazi Germany.

In 1962, Teagle died at the age of 83 in Byram, Connecticut after a long illness, He was entombed in the Teagle Mausoleum at Putnam Cemetery, Greenwich Connecticut.

== Honors ==
Teagle was selected as one of 20th Century Great American Business Leaders by Harvard Business School and was inducted into the Automotive Hall of Fame in 1974 for his work at Standard Oil in expanding research and development of petroleum-based products, leading to fuel refinements and diverse petrochemical uses such as in cosmetics and food preservatives. He appears on the cover of the December 9, 1929 issue of Time Magazine. He was also selected as one of the 100 Most Notable Cornellians and inducted into the Cornell University Athletic Hall of Fame.

== Other positions ==
Teagle was very active in labor, business, and trade organizations and councils. Though supportive of the Republican Party, Teagle was also more supportive of labor rights, in contrast to many other businessmen of his day. He served as head of President Hoover's job sharing movement and on the National Labor Board during its brief tenure from 1933 to 1934, helping handle labor disputes. He was appointed to President Roosevelt's National Defense Mediation Board and National War Labor Board. He was also on the national Business Advisory Council and a director of the National Foreign Trade Council and Federal Reserve Bank.

In 1944, he established The Teagle Foundation "to advance the well-being and general good of mankind throughout the world." At Teagle's request, the foundation's directors always include an individual appointed by Cornell University and an individual appointed by ExxonMobil.

During the 1956 U.S. Presidential election, Teagle donated $6,200 to the Republican Party.
