= John Kenneth Jamieson =

Canadian-American engineer and oilman

14th President of the Standard Oil Company (New Jersey)
- In office March 1, 1965 – September 31, 1969
- Preceded by: Michael L. Haider
- Succeeded by: Milo M. Brisco

11th Chairman of the Standard Oil Company (New Jersey)
- In office October 1, 1969 – July 31, 1975
- Preceded by: Michael L. Haider
- Succeeded by: Clifton C. Garvin

Personal details
- Born: 28 August 1910 Medicine Hat, Alberta
- Died: 26 September 1999 (aged 89) Houston, Texas
- Spouse: Ethel May Burns (m. 1937)
- Education: University of Alberta, Massachusetts Institute of Technology

John Kenneth Jamieson (28 August 1910 – 26 September 1999) was a Canadian-American engineer and oilman. Jamieson served from 1963 to 1964 as the president of Humble Oil, and from 1965 to 1969 as president and 1969 to 1975 as chairman of Exxon.

== Biography ==
He was born in Medicine Hat, Alberta and graduated from Massachusetts Institute of Technology in 1931.
