= Ralph W. Gallagher =

American oilman

10th President of the Standard Oil Company (New Jersey)
- In office January 6, 1943 – June 12, 1944
- Preceded by: William S. Farish II
- Succeeded by: Eugene Holman

5th Chairman of the Standard Oil Company (New Jersey)
- In office December 1, 1942 – January 6, 1943
- In office June 12, 1944 – December 31, 1945
- Preceded by: Walter C. Teagle
- Succeeded by: Frank W. Abrams

Personal details
- Born: May 27, 1881 Salamanca, New York
- Died: July 31, 1952 (aged 71) New York City, New York
- Resting place: Gate of Heaven Cemetery
- Spouse: Mary E. Gallagher

Ralph W. Gallagher (May 27, 1881 – July 31, 1952) was an American oilman who served as president and chairman of the Standard Oil Company (New Jersey). Gallagher began his career in 1897 at age 16 working for a company owned by Standard Oil. In 1900 he joined the East Ohio Gas Company, which was also owned by Standard. After the breakup of Standard Oil in 1911, East Ohio remained a Jersey Standard subsidiary. In 1923 he was appointed East Ohio's vice-president, and in 1926 president. Gallagher moved to New York in 1933 and that year was elected a director of Jersey Standard. In 1937 he was appointed vice-president, and upon the resignation of Walter C. Teagle in November 1942, was elected the company's chairman. After Jersey's president William S. Farish II died unexpectedly that same month, Gallagher left the chair and took over the presidency. He remained president until June 1944, when he once again became chairman. Gallagher retired at the end of 1945, shortly before he hit Standard's retirement age of 65.

== Biography ==
Ralph W. Gallagher was born on May 27, 1881, in Salamanca, New York to parents of Irish Catholic origin. After his father became ill, Gallagher left high school in 1897 at age 16 to begin working and help provide for his family. Gallagher's first job was at a pumping station in Olean, New York with the New York Transit Company, which was owned by Standard Oil. At some point in the late 1890s, he also worked for the National Transit Company and the United Pipe Lines Company, both of which were Standard-owned companies in Bradford, Pennsylvania. Outside of work hours, Gallagher studied engineering on his own.

In 1900 Gallagher joined the East Ohio Gas Company. His first role was in Akron, Ohio as a shop foreman. He quickly rose through the company's ranks, and in 1908 was transferred to Cleveland to serve as the superintendent of the company's pipeline system. In 1910 he was put in charge of the company's gas plants and main lines. Upon the breakup of Standard Oil in 1911, East Ohio became the property of Standard Oil of New Jersey. Gallagher continued to rise within East Ohio; in 1923 he was elected a director and was appointed vice-president. That same year he became the president of the American Gas Association. In 1926 he was appointed president and also began undertaking assignments for Standard Oil of New Jersey.

Gallagher moved to New York City in 1933 to supervise Standard Oil of New Jersey's natural gas operations. In November of that year he was elected a director. In 1937 he was appointed vice-president and became a member of the executive committee. After Walter C. Teagle resigned as chairman on November 23, 1942, Gallagher was elected to replace him, and assumed the chair on December 1. On November 29, less than a week after Gallagher's election, president William S. Farish II died unexpectedly. In January 1943, the board asked Gallagher to step down as chairman and take over running the company as president. Gallagher agreed to the request and took over the presidency on January 6. He remained in this role until June 12, 1944, when he was succeeded by Eugene Holman. At this time he was reelected chairman and held the office until December 31, 1945.

In their history of Standard Oil of New Jersey, Henrietta M. Larson, Evelyn H. Knowlton, and Charles S. Popple wrote:

Gallagher had qualities of personality and character as well as experience which uniquely fitted him for leadership in the company at this particular time. He was a man of firm convictions, but he was also essentially a modest man. He had a practical wisdom derived from his experience as a veteran executive in the natural gas industry. He won the confidence of those with whom he worked by his integrity, intelligence, fairness, and sound judgement. He encouraged free communication and full discussion with his associates individually or in formal meetings of Executive Committee and Board of Directors. He had positive ideas about administrative arrangements and procedures and about public relations.

During his career, Gallagher also served as a director of W. T. Grant and J. P. Morgan. In 1938, the tanker SS R. W. Gallagher was named in his honor.

At an unknown date, Gallagher married Mary E. [maiden name unknown]. The couple had a son and two daughters. Mary died on August 22, 1938. On July 31, 1952, Ralph Gallagher died in his apartment at 1040 Park Avenue, aged 71.
