= Michael Lawrence Haider =

American oilman (1904–1986)

13th President of the Standard Oil Company (New Jersey)
- In office April 1, 1963 – February 28, 1965
- Preceded by: Monroe J. Rathbone II
- Succeeded by: J. Kenneth Jamieson

10th Chairman of the Standard Oil Company (New Jersey)
- In office March 1, 1965 – September 30, 1969
- Preceded by: Monroe J. Rathbone II
- Succeeded by: J. Kenneth Jamieson

Personal details
- Born: October 1, 1904; Mandan, North Dakota
- Died: August 14, 1986 (aged 81); Atherton, California
- Spouse: Alice Cecil Strauss (m. 1928)
- Education: Stanford University (BS, 1927)

Michael Lawrence Haider (October 1, 1904 – August 14, 1986) was an American petroleum engineer, business executive, and a founder of the National Academy of Engineering. He was chairman of what later became Exxon Corporation from 1965 to 1969.

== Life and career ==
Haider was born on a wheat farm in Mandan, North Dakota, moved to California as a teenager, and in 1927 received his B.A. in chemistry from Stanford University. In 1929 he started his career in Tulsa, Oklahoma, as a chemical engineer with Carter Oil (an affiliate of Standard Oil of New Jersey, later Exxon). One early assignment was to check the quality of helium for dirigibles. He became chief petroleum engineer and then managed all engineering for Carter. In 1938 he moved to New York as manager of Exxon's production engineering and research, and in 1945 became executive assistant in the Producing Department.

In 1946 Haider moved to Toronto, where in 1947 as manager of the Producing and Exploration Department of Imperial Oil, Limited, a Canadian affiliate, he obtained the Leduc oil field that made western Canada a net oil exporter. He was subsequently elected a director of Imperial (1948) and vice president (1950). In 1952 Haider returned to New York where he served for two years as deputy coordinator of worldwide production. He then became president and a director of International Petroleum Company, Limited, responsible for parts of South America.

In 1959 he was elected a Standard Oil of New Jersey director, then vice president and director for Latin America (1960), and executive vice-president and member of the Executive Committee (1961). In 1963 he was elected president and vice chairman of the Executive Committee, and in 1965 he became chairman of the board and chief executive officer until his retirement in 1969.

Haider served as chairman of the American Petroleum Institute and president of the American Institute of Mining, Metallurgical, and Petroleum Engineers (1952). He was director of First National City Bank and the Economic Development Council of New York City, trustee of the Committee for Economic Development, and member of the Council on Foreign Relations, the National Petroleum Council, and The Business Council. He was a chairman of the Radio Free Europe and Metropolitan Opera board member. He was elected to Spain's Instituto de Cultura Hispánica (1962) and was awarded its Gran Cruz de la Order del Merito Civil in 1969, in which year he also received Italy's Cavaliere di Gran Croce. It was the year 1969 that Haider was also awarded the John Fritz Medal. In 1970 he was awarded the Charles Frederic Rand Memorial Gold Medal, bestowed by the American Institute of Mining, Metallurgical, and Petroleum Engineers.
