= Martha F. Gerry =

American racehorse owner

- Born: Martha B. Farish; October 20, 1918; Houston, Texas, U.S.
- Died: September 17, 2007 (aged 88); New York City, U.S.
- Education: The Masters School; Vassar College
- Known for: Owner of Forego
- Political party: Republican
- Board member of: New York Racing Association; National Museum of Racing and Hall of Fame
- Spouse: Edward Harriman Gerry
- Children: 4
- Parent(s): William Stamps Farish II; Libbie Randon Rice
- Relatives: William Farish III (nephew)
- Honors: Thoroughbred Club of America's Honored Guest (1978); Exemplar of Racing (2007)

Martha B. Farish Gerry (October 20, 1918 – September 17, 2007) was an American Thoroughbred racehorse owner named an Exemplar of Racing by the National Museum of Racing and Hall of Fame.

== Early life ==
Martha B. Farish was born on October 20, 1918, in Houston, Texas. She was the daughter of Libbie Randon Rice and her husband, William Stamps Farish II (1881–1942), president of Standard Oil from 1937 to 1942. She was raised in New York where she studied at The Masters School in Dobbs Ferry, New York and Vassar College in Poughkeepsie. She was the aunt of William Stamps Farish III, the United States Ambassador to the United Kingdom under President George W. Bush.

== Career ==
Gerry was best known as the owner and breeder of three-time American Horse of the Year, Forego whom she raced under the Lazy F. Ranch banner. In 57 starts, Forego had 34 wins, 9 seconds and 7 thirds and registered 24 stakes victories including 14 Grade 1 wins. His lifetime earnings amounted to $1,938,957.

She was a long-time trustee of the New York Racing Association and of the Thoroughbred Owners and Breeders Association. In 1974, she was the recipient of the New York Turf Writers Association award as the woman who did the most for racing and was the Thoroughbred Club of America's Honored Guest of 1978. In 1983, Gerry, Allaire du Pont, and Penny Chenery became the first women to be admitted as members of The Jockey Club.

== Personal life ==
In 1939, she married Edward Harriman Gerry (1914–2003) at St. James Episcopal Church on Madison Avenue and Seventy-first street in New York City. Gerry was the son of Robert Livingston Gerry Sr. (1877–1957) and Cornelia Averell Harriman (1884–1966), the daughter of railroad executive E. H. Harriman and his wife Mary Williamson Averell. Robert was also the nephew of Peter G. Gerry and Edith Stuyvesant Vanderbilt, and the grandson of Elbridge Thomas Gerry, himself the grandson of Elbridge Gerry, the 5th U.S. Vice President. The Gerrys maintained residences in Monticello, Florida and Mill Neck, New York. Together, they were the parents of:

- Libby Farish Gerry
- Cornelia Harriman Gerry, who married Richard A. Corbett in 1970.
- Martha Rice Gerry, who married Frank Bradford Townley in 1978.
- William Farish Gerry (b. 1955), who married Gay Caroline Vincent, daughter of Betsy von Furstenberg in 1988.

Gerry died September 17, 2007, following heart surgery at New York Presbyterian Hospital, of which she had been a Life Trustee. Her husband predeceased her on January 24, 2003.
