= William Stamps Farish II =

American businessman

9th President of the Standard Oil Company (New Jersey)
- In office June 1, 1937 – November 29, 1942
- Preceded by: Walter C. Teagle
- Succeeded by: Ralph W. Gallagher

3rd Chairman of the Standard Oil Company (New Jersey)
- In office June 6, 1933 – June 1, 1937
- Preceded by: George H. Jones
- Succeeded by: Walter C. Teagle

Personal details
- Born: February 23, 1881 Mayersville, Mississippi, U.S.
- Died: November 29, 1942 (aged 61) Millbrook, New York, U.S.
- Resting place: Glenwood Cemetery
- Spouse: Libbie Randon Rice (m. 1911)
- Education: University of Mississippi (1900)

William Stamps Farish II (February 23, 1881 – November 29, 1942) was a pioneer in East Texas oilfield development, president of Standard Oil and a founding member and president of the American Petroleum Institute. He was a member of the influential Farish family.

== Early life ==
Farish was born in Mayersville, Mississippi the son of William Stamps Farish I (1843–1899) and Katherine Maude Power (1860–1931) and the grandnephew of Jefferson Davis. He attended school at St. Thomas Hall, an Episcopal preparatory school at Holly Springs, Mississippi. The school was founded in 1844 by a New Yorker, the Reverend Francis Lister Hawks (1798–1866). A brilliant, winsome, and sometimes controversial Episcopal priest and educator, Hawks attracted motivated students from all over the Episcopal Diocese of Mississippi. Hawks's vision for the school in Holly Springs was derived in part from W.A. Muhlenberg's successful schools on Long Island. In 1847, Hawks left Mississippi to become the first President of the University of Louisiana in New Orleans (now the Tulane University of Louisiana).

== Career ==
After receiving a law degree from the University of Mississippi in 1900, he practiced law for three months at Clarksdale, Mississippi, before moving to Beaumont, Texas, when oil was discovered at the Spindletop oilfield. He became supervisor of wells for Texas Oil Fields, Limited, an English syndicate. The next year he organized the Brown-Farish Oil Company, which did contract drilling and traded in oil. The firm became bankrupt at Brown's death, but Farish succeeded in borrowing money to pay creditors. By 1904 Farish and Robert Lee Blaffer had formed a partnership to do contract drilling and lease trading. The next year Blaffer and Farish moved to Houston to be nearer the Humble field.

In 1915, Farish became president of the Gulf Coast Producers Association and subsequently was named president of the Texas-Louisiana Oil and Gas Association. In March 1917, he and others organized the Humble Oil and Refining Company. As vice president, Farish was in charge of production, advancing industry technology and helping the company expand rapidly. In 1918, he raised the profile of Humble, serving on the Petroleum Committee of the Council for National Defense. When Humble grew short of capital for expansion, Farish turned to industry executives he had met. He negotiated with Walter Teagle, head of Standard Oil of New Jersey (later Exxon Corporation), which paid $17 million for a slight majority of Humble in 1919, and Humble gained a market for its oil and financial backing to build in Baytown, Texas one of the world's largest refineries.

Farish served as vice president for five years and in 1922 became president. The Houston company, which remained surprisingly autonomous, became Jersey Standard's largest operating unit. In 1926, Farish became a founder and president of the American Petroleum Institute, taking a leadership position in oil conservation. In 1933, he became chairman of the board of Standard Oil Company of New Jersey, which held substantial stock interest in Humble, and in 1937, he became president of Standard. At the beginning of World War II, Farish was a member of the National Petroleum Industry War Council.

=== World War II controversy ===
Farish had been a principal in a partnership between a Standard Oil/General Motors owned company, Ethyl Gasoline Corporation, and the German company I.G. Farben. This jointly owned venture, Ethyl GmbH, was involved with the creation of the Auschwitz labor camp on June 14, 1940, to produce artificial rubber from coal and they also built then operated tetraethyllead plants in Germany.

On March 25, 1942, U.S. Assistant Attorney General Thurman Arnold announced that Farish, along with other officers of Standard Oil and related companies, pleaded "no contest" in the criminal courts of Newark, New Jersey to criminally conspiring with the Nazi government in Germany. As part of a plea bargain, the charges were dropped in exchange for Standard Oil releasing its German patents and paying fines totaling about $50,000.

William Stamps Farish was fined $1,000 while similar fines were levied against Standard Oil -- $5,000 each for the parent company and for several subsidiaries. This did not interfere with the millions of dollars that Farish had profited as a large stockholder, chairman and president of Standard Oil. He was described by Senator Harry Truman in public as approaching 'treason' for profiting from the Nazi war machine and withholding patents from the US government.

=== Lazy F Ranch ===
William Stamps Farish II founded Lazy F Ranch in Texas. After his death in 1942, his widow and daughter Martha F. Gerry took over the running of the operation. Under Lazy F colors, Martha Gerry bred and raced a number of Thoroughbred racehorses the most famous of which was Forego, who raced between 1973 and 1978. Voted United States Horse of the Year three years in a row and a U.S. Racing Hall of Fame inductee, Forego was ranked #8 in The Blood-Horse magazine list of the Top 100 U.S. Racehorses of the 20th Century.

== Personal life ==
On June 1, 1911, he married Libbie Randon Rice in Houston. Libbie was a cousin of the first wife of Jefferson Davis, Sarah Knox Taylor, daughter of President Zachary Taylor, and a granddaughter of Walter Browne Botts, a founder of the international law firm of Baker-Botts. (Farish's great-grandfather, Hazelwood M. Farish (1809–1851), married Jane Lucinda Davis (1821–51), youngest sister of Jefferson Davis, President of the CSA.) Together, W.S. and Libbie Rice Farish had a son and a daughter:

- William Stamps Farish Jr. was in the US Air Force during World War II and was the father of William Stamps Farish III (b. 1939).
- Martha Farish (1918–2007), who married Edward Harriman Gerry (1914–2003), in 1939. Gerry was the son of Robert Livingston Gerry Sr. (1877–1957) and Cornelia Averell Harriman (1884–1966), the daughter of railroad executive E. H. Harriman and his wife Mary Williamson Averell.

Farish resided in the Shadyside community, developed by his friend, Joseph S. Cullinan.

William Stamps Farish II died at the age of 61 on November 29, 1942, in Millbrook, New York, while visiting friends; he was buried in Houston. Farish had established the W. S. Farish Co. in 1929 to manage the family assets, which were valued by Forbes in 1992 at $400 million. The holdings include the Farish Fund foundation, providing millions for charitable causes. W. S. Farish Co., today is headed by grandson Will III, and still operates in Houston.

== See also ==
- William Stamps Farish III (grandson)
- William Stamps Farish IV (great grandson)
