= Leo D. Welch =

American banker (1898 – 1978)

Leo Dewey Welch
- Born: April 22, 1898; Rochester, New York, United States
- Died: October 21, 1978 (aged 80); Cuernavaca, Morelos, Mexico
- Education: University of Rochester (A.B. 1919)
- Occupation(s): Banker, oilman
- Spouse: Veronica Avilla Purviance (m. 1926)
- Children: 1

8th Chairman of the Standard Oil Company (New Jersey)
- In office May 1, 1960 – March 31, 1963
- Preceded by: Eugene Holman
- Succeeded by: Monroe J. Rathbone

Leo Dewey Welch (April 22, 1898 – October 21, 1978) was an American banker and oilman who served as a senior official with several major corporations.

Welch began his career in 1919 with the National City Bank of New York and remained with the bank until 1944. That year, he joined the Standard Oil Company (New Jersey) as the company's treasurer. Dewey rose through the company ranks and was elected a director in 1953, appointed a vice-president in 1956, and executive vice-president in 1957. In April 1960, Welch was elected chairman of the board.

He remained the company's chairman until February 1963, when President John F. Kennedy nominated him to become the first chairman of the Communications Satellite Corporation (Comsat). Welch stepped down from the Comsat chair in November 1965, though he remained a director until 1977.

== Early life and education ==
Leo Dewey Welch was born on April 22, 1898, in Rochester, New York to William Frederick Welch (1867–1962) and Mary Elizabeth Compton (1867–1946). The Welch family was Roman Catholic. Leo attended the University of Rochester during World War I and graduated Bachelor of Arts in 1919. During university, Welch served in the United States Navy Reserve.

== Career ==
Welch began his career in 1919 with the National City Bank of New York; he had entered the bank's training program in 1916. In the early 1920s, Welch was sent to work at the bank's Buenos Aires branch. He transferred later to Chile, where he served as a manager and then supervisor until 1934, at which time he returned to Argentina to serve as manager for the Río de la Plata region branches. During his time in South America, from 1936 to 1937 he served as president of the U.S. Chamber of Commerce in Argentina, from 1936 to 1940 was a director of the Central Bank of Argentina, and from 1941 to 1943 was president of the Argentine Trade Promotion Corporation. In 1943 he was appointed a vice-president of the bank.

In September 1944, Welch left the National City Bank to become treasurer of Standard Oil of New Jersey, replacing Jay E. Crane in the position. Crane was elected to the board that year, and then left in 1953 to become chairman of the Federal Reserve Bank of New York. On May 27, 1953, Welsh was elected to the board to fill Crane's role as financial expert. On September 6, 1956, he was appointed a vice-president, and the following year he was appointed an executive vice-president. In April 1960, Welch was elected chairman of the board to replace Eugene Holman, who had hit Standard's mandatory retirement age of 65. Welch assumed the office on May 1.

In February 1963, President John F. Kennedy nominated Welch to become the first chairman of the new Communications Satellite Corporation. The appointment was made concurrently with that of Joseph V. Charyk as president. Welch assumed the office after the Senate ratified the appointments. He remained with the company until it was running functionally. In July 1965 he announced that he would step down as chairman, and did so on November 30 of that year.

Welch served as a director for Scudder Duo-Vest Inc., Scudder Duo-Vest Exchange Fund Inc., General Dynamics, Compania Ontario, and Electric Bond and Share Company. He was also a member of the Council on Foreign Relations and the Pan American Society, a director of the Commonwealth Fund, a trustee of the Committee for Economic Development and the University of Rochester, and a trustee and vice-chairman of the U.S. council of the International Chamber of Commerce. Socially, Welch was a member of the Augusta National Golf Club, Burning Tree Club, Maidstone Club, Millwood Country Club, Clove Valley Rod & Gun Club, Chevy Chase Club, Jockey Club, Piping Rock Club, Creek Club, Theta Delta Chi, University Club of New York, Metropolitan Club, and Confrérie des Chevaliers du Tastevin. Welch was made a Commander of the Order of Merit in Chile and a Commander of the Order of May in Argentina.

== Personal life and death ==
On January 27, 1926, Welch married Veronica Avilla Purviance (1902–1970) at the Iglesia María Auxiliadora in Montevideo. They had one daughter, Gloria Veronica Welch (1939–2003). After Veronica's death in 1970, Welch became companions with Catherine Mary Burdick, whose husband Thomas had died in 1969.

In October 1978, Leo and Catherine travelled to Mexico to visit Garrard Wood Glenn, a retired corporate lawyer who had worked at Lord Day & Lord, and his wife Avril. On October 28, the quartet was driving from Cuernavaca to Mexico City when their vehicle, driven by Avril Glenn, swerved off the road and hit a gasoline truck. All four were killed in the crash. Welch was buried with his late wife in Locust Valley Cemetery, Locust Valley, New York.
