= Darren Woods =

American businessman and CEO of ExxonMobil

Darren W. Woods
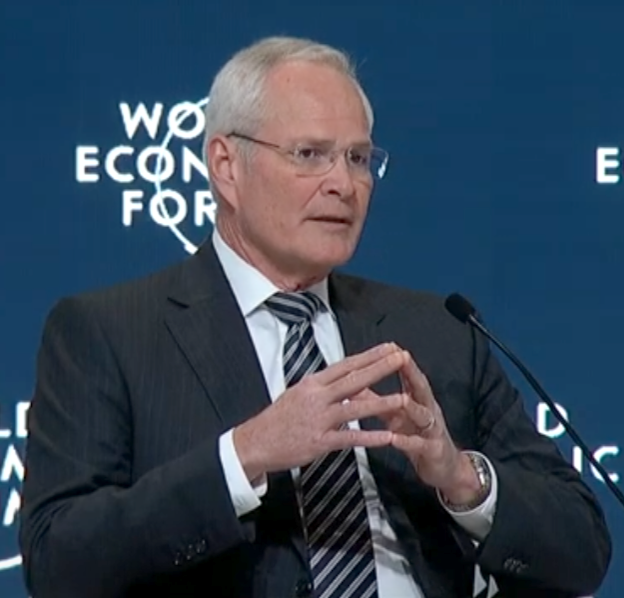
- Woods in 2024
- Born: December 16, 1965 (age 60); Wichita, Kansas
- Education: Texas A&M University (BS); Northwestern University (MBA)

23rd President of ExxonMobil
- Incumbent
- Assumed office January 1, 2016
- Preceded by: Rex W. Tillerson

16th Chairman of ExxonMobil
- Incumbent
- Assumed office January 1, 2017
- Preceded by: Rex W. Tillerson

Darren Wayne Woods (born December 16, 1965) is an American businessman who has been the CEO and chairman of ExxonMobil since January 2017.

== Early life ==
Woods was born in Wichita, Kansas. Due to his father's work as a military supplier, he spent much of his youth living near various U.S. military bases around the world. He earned a bachelor's degree in electrical engineering from Texas A&M University, followed by an MBA from Northwestern University's Kellogg School of Management.

== Career ==
=== ExxonMobil ===
Woods joined Exxon in 1992. He had worked for Exxon for 24 years prior to being promoted to CEO following Rex Tillerson's nomination by President Donald Trump to be the next United States Secretary of State. While his predecessor was involved in deal making and exploration, Woods is a veteran of the refining side of the oil business. Prior to becoming CEO, Woods ran the refining and chemical divisions of the company, which delivered the majority of ExxonMobil's $7.8 billion net income in 2016.

At an investor meeting in New York in 2017, Woods outlined his growth plan including drilling in the Permian Basin of Texas and New Mexico and the Bakken shale formation in North Dakota. He also spoke briefly about the company's operations in Russia, expressing an optimistic outlook regarding Exxon's Sakhalin project on Russia's eastern coast.

Woods has said that the combination of horizontal drilling and hydraulic fracturing has "shattered the Peak Oil myth". Woods has publicly endorsed the Paris Agreement. The accord commits nations to cutting greenhouse gas emissions. In May 2017, Woods wrote a personal letter to President Trump to urge that the U.S. remain a party to the agreement and not withdraw. He says that by remaining a party to the accords the U.S. will have a seat at the table to "ensure a level playing field" and support "the most cost-effective greenhouse gas reduction options".

On October 5, 2020, Bloomberg News reported that Exxon was set to increase its annual carbon emissions by about 17%, or about as much as the annual output of Greece. The emissions expansion would be built off an investment plan reportedly signed off by Woods. Exxon said its internal projections are "a preliminary, internal assessment of estimated cumulative emission growth through 2025 and did not include the [additional] mitigation and abatement measures that would have been evaluated in the planning process. Furthermore, the projections identified in the leaked documents have significantly changed, a fact that was not fully explained or prominently featured in the article."

In 2022, Woods was named one of the US' top "climate villains" by The Guardian after "Exxon lobbyists were captured on video revealing the company's efforts to obstruct climate legislation in Congress."

Woods claimed in an interview with CNBC journalist David Faber in June 2022 that part of ExxonMobil's long-term strategy to remain a profitable company while reducing greenhouse gas emissions and plastic pollution was to invest in carbon capture and storage technology with a network hub in Houston and to remain a plastics producer while making changes to waste management. Woods also called for a higher carbon price. In April 2024, Woods stated on the company quarterly earnings call that while the company was continuing to develop direct air capture (DAC) technology, DAC was currently unaffordable at $600 to $1,000 per ton of carbon dioxide removal and needed to be brought down to $100 per ton to be globally scalable.

On December 8, 2023, Woods attended the Chemical Marketing & Economics gala in New York City, to be honored with a "STEM leadership award" for "harnessing the transformative power of chemistry to advance humanity". Because of his role in increasing oil and gas consumption, a group of climate activists disrupted and brought an end to the gala. They carried a banner that notably read "Eat shit Darren".

In 2021, The Guardian reported that Woods' salary exceeded $20,000,000 per year. In 2023, Woods's total compensation from ExxonMobil was $31 million, representing a CEO-to-median worker pay ratio of 199-to-1. In 2024, his compensation rose to $44.1 million, with a pay ratio of 231-to-1.

In November 2024, Woods stated in an interview that the second Trump administration should not withdraw from the Paris Agreement and that ExxonMobil company investments in CCS and DAC would change if tax credits established under the Inflation Reduction Act are repealed or reduced.

He is a member of The Business Council.

==== Alleged lying to Congress ====
In 2021, Woods denied that Exxon had covered up its own research about Big Oil's contribution to the climate crisis. The chair of the Congressional committee taking Woods' testimony likened Woods' denial to the decades' long lies by the American tobacco industry denying that nicotine is addictive. Woods also declined to make a pledge to stop lobbying against climate initiatives.

Business positions
Preceded by Rex Tillerson	Chief Executive Officer of ExxonMobil; 2017–present	Succeeded by Incumbent
