= Eugene Holman =

American oilman (1895–1962)

- Born: May 2, 1895; San Angelo, Texas
- Died: August 12, 1962 (aged 67); New York City
- Education: Simmons College (AB 1916); University of Texas (MA 1917)
- Spouse: Edith Carver Reid (m. 1923)
- Military career
- Branch: United States Army
- Service years: 1918
- Rank: Corporal
- Unit: United States Army Signal Corps

11th President of the Standard Oil Company (New Jersey)
- In office June 12, 1944 – December 31, 1953
- Preceded by: Ralph W. Gallagher
- Succeeded by: Monroe J. Rathbone

7th Chairman of the Standard Oil Company (New Jersey)
- In office January 1, 1954 – April 30, 1960
- Preceded by: Frank W. Abrams
- Succeeded by: Leo D. Welch

Eugene Holman (May 2, 1895 – August 12, 1962) was an American geologist and oilman. Holman's career began in 1917 when he worked briefly for Texaco. After serving in the United States Army in World War I, Holman joined the United States Geological Survey. In early 1919, he was hired by Humble Oil and by 1926 had become the company's head geologist. Humble's majority shareholder, the Standard Oil Company (New Jersey), transferred Holman to its headquarters in New York in 1929. Holman spent the 1930s as an executive with Standard affiliate companies in South America. In 1940 he was elected a director of Standard, in 1942 was appointed a vice-president, and in 1944 became president of the company. Holman served as president for a decade, and then in 1954 was elected chairman of the board. During his time as head of Jersey, he negotiated its purchase of 30 per cent of the Arabian-American Oil Company and its outright acquisition of Humble. He remained chairman until his retirement in 1960. During his career, Holman earned the reputation as "the world's outstanding oilman."

== Biography ==
Eugene Holman was born on May 2, 1895, in San Angelo, Texas to James Riley Holman Jr. (1854–1929) and America Geneva Moore (1859–1933). James Riley Holman Sr. (1811–1861) was raised in Missouri and went west early in the California Gold Rush. There, by his Scottish wife Ann Cummins (1819–1864), James Jr. was born. In 1864, age 10, James Jr. was orphaned. In 1870, he moved to Argentina as a colonist. In 1875, Holman married Geneva Moore, whose father William Tandy Moore (1824–1833) had been an early member of the California Colony in Argentina. After the situation in Argentina became unstable and Geneva's brother was killed, in 1877 James and Geneva returned to the United States and settled in Texas. Eugene Holman was born in San Angelo but grew up in Monahans, where his parents ran a hotel in their house. In the late 1990s, the Holman house was moved to the Million Barrel Museum.

In 1911, Holman completed grade 10, which was the highest education then offered in Monahans. In 1912 he entered Simmons College in Abilene and in 1916 graduated Bachelor of Arts. At Simmons, Holman was a member of Chi Phi. Holman then enrolled at the University of Texas to study civil engineering. However, a professor encouraged him to switch to geology, and in 1917 Holman graduated Master of Arts in geology. Upon graduation, Holman joined Texaco and participated in a survey of Cuba, Mexico, and Texas. In 1918, he enlisted in the United States Army and served for a year in the aerial photography division of the Signal Corps. For a time he was stationed in England.

After he left the Army, Holman joined the United States Geological Survey for a short time and worked in Washington, D.C., Oklahoma, and Texas. In March 1919, Holman got a job as a geologist with Humble Oil through Wallace E. Pratt, the company's chief geologist. His initial assignments included geological scouting in North Texas. In 1922, he was appointed superintendent of the Louisiana-Arkansas division, and then in 1926 he was recalled to company headquarters in Houston and appointed Humble's chief geologist.

Holman's success with Humble attracted the attention of Everit J. Sadler, a director of the Standard Oil Company (New Jersey), which in 1919 had acquired a 50 per cent stake in Humble. In February 1929, Standard transferred Holman to its head office in New York where he was made an assistant to the vice-president in charge of crude oil production. Early in his time with Jersey, Holman became interested in crude oil production in South America and spent most of the 1930s as an executive of affiliate companies in this region. During this time he served as president of the Pan American Foreign Corporation, Creole Petroleum Corporation, Lago Petroleum Corporation, Huasteca Petroleum, and Mexican Petroleum. As head of these affiliate companies, Holman placed an emphasis on employee relations and prioritized the hiring of foreign nationals wherever possible.

On June 4, 1940, Holman was elected a director of Jersey, and on December 1, 1942, was appointed a vice-president. During World War II, Holman served in the Petroleum Administration of the War Council. On June 12, 1944, he was appointed president of Jersey, succeeding Ralph W. Gallagher and in January 1946 became chairman of the executive committee.. As president, in December 1946 Holman negotiated the acquisition of a 30 per cent stake in the Arabian-American Oil Company for roughly $74 million. At the beginning of 1954, Holman succeeded Frank W. Abrams as chairman of the board, and was replaced as president by Monroe J. Rathbone. During his chairmanship, Holman arranged the purchase of the remainder of Humble Oil, which was completed at the end of 1959. Holman retired from the board after the 1960 annual meeting, at which time Rathbone was elected chairman.

In their history of Jersey Standard, Henrietta M. Larson, Evelyn H. Knowlton, and Charles S. Popple summarized Holman's leadership at the company, writing,

He was a leader of unimpeachable integrity, wide horizons, and a long time-perspective. With his appreciation of the logistics of oil, he showed great foresight in appraising the company's future needs. He was also cognizant of, and sympathetic with, the worldwide movements of the time for social and economic improvement. [...] He was by nature a leader. He was clearheaded and levelheaded. In the solution of a problem his rule was: analyze, organize, delegate, and supervise.

Holman was a member of the American Association of Petroleum Geologists and the American Petroleum Institute. Socially, he was a member of the University Club, Explorers Club, Rockaway Hunting Club, Knollwood Country Club, and Lawrence Beach Club. He was a Freemason and a member of the Episcopal Church. Until 1940 Holman voted for the Democratic Party, but that year supported Republican candidate Wendell Willkie for president. He later became a close friend and confidant of Dwight D. Eisenhower.

On November 21, 1923, at the Main Street Methodist Church in Shreveport, Louisiana, Holman married Edith Carver Reid (1902–1975). The Holmans had two children, Catherine Geneva and Eugene Jr. (1933–2013). Holman died on August 12, 1962, in New York City at age 67. He was buried in Putnam Cemetery in Connecticut.
