= Frank W. Abrams =

American oilman (1889–1976)

- Born: June 24, 1889; Rockville Centre, New York
- Died: July 17, 1976 (aged 87); Greenport, Suffolk County, New York
- Education: Syracuse University (BCE 1912)
- Spouse: Ruth Florence Corrigan (m. 1915)

6th Chairman of the Standard Oil Company (New Jersey)
- In office January 1, 1946 – December 31, 1953
- Preceded by: Ralph W. Gallagher
- Succeeded by: Eugene Holman

Frank Whittemore Abrams (June 24, 1889 – July 17, 1976) was an American engineer and oilman. Abrams joined the Standard Oil Company (New Jersey) in 1912 as a draftsman at the company's Eagle Works refinery in Jersey City. Abrams rose to become the refinery's superintendent and later its manager. In 1927, he was elected a director of one of Jersey's operating subsidiaries, and then became its president in 1933. Abrams was elected a director of Jersey in 1940 and appointed a vice-president in 1944. At the beginning of 1946, he became chairman of the board of directors, succeeding Ralph W. Gallagher. During his chairmanship, Abrams worked in tandem with president Eugene Holman, and became known as "the most renowned humanist in the history of the Jersey board." Abrams remained in the chair until the end of 1953. Both during and after his time with Jersey Standard, Abrams dedicated himself to the cause of raising money for universities.

== Biography ==
Frank Whittemore Abrams was born in Rockville Centre, New York on June 24, 1889, to Zachariah Abrams (1856–1931) and Mary Louise Farmer (1862–1949). He had three older brothers: Clifford, Lewis, and Henry. His brother Henry Farmer "Harry" Abrams (1885–1944) also became an oilman and was a director of the Vacuum Oil Company and a member of the manufacturing committee of the Standard Oil Company of New York. Frank entered Syracuse University in 1908, and in 1912 graduated Bachelor of Civil Engineering. He was the only one of the four Abrams brothers to receive a university education. During his time at Syracuse he became a member of Sigma Alpha Epsilon.

Abrams joined the Standard Oil Company (New Jersey) upon graduation in 1912 and worked as a draftsman at the company's Eagle Works refinery in Jersey City. In 1920, he was appointed superintendent of the refinery. Then, in 1922, he moved to New York and was made the manager of the Eagle Works as well as another Jersey Standard subsidiary in Parkersburg, West Virginia.

In 1927, Abrams was elected a director of the Standard Oil Company of New Jersey (incorporated in Delaware). This company, which became known as the Delaware Company, had been incorporated on August 29, 1927, and was established to take over the manufacturing and marketing functions, and assets of Jersey Standard, as well as stock of several of Jersey's affiliate companies. The Delaware Company's first president was Charles G. Black, a Jersey director. In June 1933, Abrams succeeded Black as the Delaware Company's president.

On June 4, 1940, Abrams was elected a director of Jersey Standard. On June 12, 1944, he was appointed a vice-president, and served in this role until the end of 1945. In December 1945, Ralph W. Gallagher resigned as chairman and Abrams was elected as his replacement. In his history of the company, Bennett H. Wall described Abrams's leadership, saying,

Among the earliest of the Jersey leaders to recognize that the continued existence and growth of the company depended upon the consent of the public, and that general acceptance and approval of the corporation required it to assume certain obligations as well as privileges of citizenship, Abrams helped to broaden the definition of social responsibility he believe should guide Jersey. Each of the directors–and most of the company executives–assumed a role in explaining this public-corporate relationship. But here, Abrams excelled.

During his time with Jersey, Abrams devoted himself to raising money for American higher education. In 1952, he founded the Council for Financial Aid to Education and served as its chairman. He also served as chairman of the Fund for the Advancement of Education within the Ford Foundation. Abrams served as a trustee of the Alfred P. Sloan Foundation, Cooper Union, Syracuse University, and Hofstra University. For his work, Abrams received more than 20 honorary degrees. During the 1960s, Abrams attached his name to the advertising campaign of the Hugh Moore Fund for International Peace, led by Hugh Moore, which sought to promote population control in the third world as a means to alleviate poverty and famine.

On October 15, 1915, Abrams married Ruth Florence Corrigan (1890–1972). They had one son, Frank Whittemore Jr. (1920–1999). Abrams was a member of the University Club of New York and the Shinnecock Hills Golf Club. He died at Eastern Long Island Hospital in Greenport, Long Island on July 17, 1976, at age 87. The funeral was held on July 20 at First Presbyterian Church in Southold, New York, and he was buried in Cutchogue Cemetery.
