= Volkswagen Bio Runner =

The Volkswagen Bio Runner is a concept car presented by Volkswagen at the October 2008 LA Design Challenge. It is powered by dual turbine engines at 500,000 rpm. It uses synthetic bio jet fuel.

It uses video support of an aerial reconnaissance drone (AR-D) when visibility is limited for a driver. It also may be transported by a support team chopper.

The Volkswagen Bio Runner was designed for a future 2025 Baja 1000 race for a recommended "One Tank Unlimited Solo" race. This race required the driver to only carry one 10-gallon tank and drive solo.
