= Human Rights Initiative of North Texas =

U.S. non-profit organization

Human Rights Initiative of North Texas, Inc. (HRI) is a non-profit organization that provides free legal assistance and social services to refugees and immigrants in the North Texas area who are the victims of human rights abuses. It was founded in 1999 by attorney Elizabeth "Betsy" Healy and social worker Serena Simmons Connelly. HRI assists clients through two main programs: the Asylum program and the Women and Children's program. The majority of legal cases are handled by a large network of volunteer attorneys.

== Asylum program ==
The Asylum program assists refugees who have fled to the United States because of past persecution, or the fear of persecution based on one of the five protected grounds.

- Race
- Religion
- Nationality
- Political Opinion
- Membership in a particular social group

Clients in the program come from all over the world, including Iran, Pakistan, Cameroon, Eritrea, Ethiopia, Botswana, Egypt, Rwanda, and the Congo.

== Women and Children's program ==
The Women and Children's program assists immigrant women and children (and in some cases, men) who are the victims of domestic violence, a violent crime, and/or abuse and neglect.

- An immigrant woman who has been the victim of domestic violence and is married to a U.S. citizen or Legal Permanent Resident may be eligible to file a petition based on the Violence Against Women Act (VAWA).
- Immigrant women who are the victims of a violent crime and who are cooperating with law enforcement may be eligible to apply for a U visa.
- An immigrant child who is the victim of neglect, abuse, or abandonment may be eligible to receive Special Immigrant Juvenile Status.

== Agency activities ==
Human Rights Initiative of North Texas (HRI) has had significant growth as an agency since its inception in 1999.

- Since 2000, HRI has trained over 620 legal professionals, and in fiscal year 2010, 143 volunteer attorneys assisted with cases and donated an average of 68 hours per case.
- In fiscal year 2010, over 5240 hours were donated by volunteer attorneys with an estimated value of more $1.95 million, bringing the total to over $10 million in donated legal services since 2000.
- On average, over 90% of HRI legal cases involve pro bono assistance.
- In 2007 and 2012, HRI received the State Bar of Texas Pro Bono Award.
- In 2008, HRI received the Arthur C. Helton Award from the American Immigration Lawyers Association (AILA). This is AILA's highest award in advancing the cause of human rights.
- Over the years, HRI has partnered with the University of North Texas, Southern Methodist University, and the University of Texas at Arlington to provide intern opportunities and possible careers for future human rights advocates.

== 2023 staff members ==
- William "Bill" Holston, Executive Director
- Margarita Alarcon, Spanish Language Fellow
- Maryam Baig, Marketing and Special Events Director
- Veronica Gonzalez, Children's Program Case Manager
- Zeyla Gonzalez, DOJ Accredited Representative
- Sierra Houck, Social Services Director
- Tom Martin, Development Director
- Naschaly Gonzalez Montalvo, Case Management Coordinator & Legal Assistant
- Kristina Morales, DOJ Accredited Representative
- Carolina Pina, Case Management Coordinator & Legal Assistant
- Antonio Reyes, G Rollie White Asylum Attorney
- Cory Sagduyu, Supervising Attorney
- Liz Ternes, Associate Development Director
- Jessica Thackway, Staff Attorney
- Brenda Todawong, Advocacy Organizer
