= Exxon donor solvent process =

Coal liquefaction process

- Process type: Chemical
- Industrial sector(s): Chemical industry Oil industry
- Feedstock: Coal
- Product(s): Synthetic fuel
- Leading companies: Carter Oil
- Year of invention: 1966
- Developer(s): Exxon Research and Engineering Company

Exxon donor solvent process (EDS) is a coal liquefaction process developed by Exxon Research and Engineering Company, starting in 1966. The process converts solid coal directly to liquid synthetic fuels which could be used as a substitute for petroleum products. The process does not involve an intermediate step of coal gasification. Exxon operated a pilot plant in Texas from 1980 until 1982.

== History ==
Exxon started to develop this process in 1966 and the development process continued until 1976. By 1975, the process was used in 1/2-tons per day pilot plant. In 1977, preparations to build the demonstration-scale 250-tons per day plant in Baytown, Texas. The plant was opened in April 1980. The plant was built by Carter Oil, an affiliate of Exxon Corporation later renamed Exxon Coal, U.S.A. The plant was financed by the United States Department of Energy and by the private investors Carter Oil, Electric Power Research Institute, Japan Coal Liquefaction Development Company, Phillips Coal Company, ARCO Coal Company, Ruhrkohle and Agip. The plant was closed and dismantled in 1982. Originally Exxon planned to open its first commercial scale plant in 1997; however, this plan was abandoned.

== Process ==
The Exxon donor solvent process is a non-catalytic processing of solvent-slurried coal in a high-pressure liquefaction reactor. Coal is cleaned, crushed and fed to the slurry dryer, where water is removed. The dry crushed coal is slurried with the hydrogen donor recycle solvent. The coal slurry is treated with hydrogen and heated in a liquefaction slurry furnace. The liquefaction occurs at 840 °F (449 °C) and 2,000 pounds per square inch (14,000 kPa). The process produces gas and liquids. After separation of gas from liquids and remaining solids, the gas is cooled to separate vaporized naptha, and scrubbed to remove ammonia, hydrogen gas, and carbon monoxide. The remaining gas is treated with hydrogen, and reused in the liquefaction reactor. Liquids, remaining solids, and condensate from the process gas are treated in fractionators for separating naptha, a spent solvent, and vacuum gas oil. Naptha is processed into different hydrocarbon products while spent solvent hydrogenated before reusing in the slurry drier.

By this process from one short ton (0.907 t) of dry, high volatile coal can be produced more than 2.6 barrels (0.41 m^{3}) of a synthetic fuel. Initially, the process was focused to be used for bituminous coals but it was tested also for lower grade coals, such as lignite. Pilot testings show that lignite was harder to process than bituminous coals and it resulted a lower oil yield.
