= Benicia Refinery =

Oil refinery in California, US

Coordinates: 38.07209°N 122.1396°W

The Benicia Refinery is an oil refinery located near the San Francisco Bay Area city of Benicia, California, United States. The refinery is owned by Valero Energy; however the company plans to cease operations in April 2026.

== History ==
The refinery was built in 1968 for Humble Oil and completed in 1969. Humble Oil changed its name to Exxon in 1972. Valero purchased the property in 2000. The Benicia Refinery has the capacity to process roughly 170,000 barrels of crude oil per day and is the sixth largest in California, accounting for about 9% of crude refining in the state. There are about 400 workers employed at the refinery, making it one of the largest employers in the city of Benicia.

In October 2024, the Bay Area Air Quality Management District and California Air Resources Board issued an $82 million fine over air pollution violations at the Benicia Refinery, following a 2019 inspection, with the fine being the largest in the Air District's history.

On April 16, 2025 Valero announced its intent to close the refinery, citing regulatory challenges as the main driver for the decision. In 2026 the process was expected to be completed in April, but Valero will continue to supply imported gasoline for the transportation needs in Northern California communities. In early 2026, the company's financial release noted the asset write-down associated with the closure "...we reduced the carrying values of the Benicia and Wilmington refineries to their estimated fair values and recognized a combined asset impairment loss of $1.1 billion in the year ended December 31, 2025"
