= List of Virginia Tech alumni =

This is a list of notable Virginia Tech alumni.

== Academia ==
- Belinda C. Anderson (1986, Ed.D.) – 11th president of Virginia Union University
- Julian Ashby Burruss (1898) – first president of Normal and Industrial School for Women (now James Madison University); eighth president of Virginia Polytechnic Institute and State University
- William M. Clemons (1995 B.S.) – professor of biochemistry at California Institute of Technology
- Bill Dally (1979, BS) – computer scientist and Professor of Electrical Engineering at Stanford University
- Thomas DiLorenzo – Austrian School economist and author; professor at Loyola University in Baltimore (Ph.D. in economics)
- Mark Embree (1996) – Rhodes Scholar; professor of mathematics at Virginia Tech;Leader of the Computational Modeling and Data Analytics (CMDA) department at Virginia Tech
- Willie Gilchrist (M.A., 1985) – chancellor of Elizabeth City State University
- Edwin D. Harrison (1948 M.S.) – sixth president of the Georgia Institute of Technology
- Joel Heinen (1982 M.S.) – professor in the Department of Earth and Environment at Florida International University
- Richard Mines (1983) environmental engineer; Emeritus Professor of Environmental and Civil Engineering at Mercer University
- Enid Montague (2008, Ph.D.) – director of the Wellness and Health Enhancement Engineering Laboratory at DePaul University
- Robert Coleman Richardson (1958 BS; 1960 MS) – physicist at Cornell University; shared the Nobel Prize in Physics in 1996 for the discovery of superfluidity in He-3
- Caitlin Rivers (2015, PhD) – assistant professor at Johns Hopkins Bloomberg School of Public Health and senior scholar at the Johns Hopkins Center for Health Security
- Linwood H. Rose (1973) – fifth president of James Madison University
- Charles W. Steger (1969) – 15th president of Virginia Polytechnic Institute and State University
- Dianne Boardley Suber (1996, Ed.D.) – 10th president of Saint Augustine’s University
- Khodr Zaarour (2020, Ph.D.) – professor of international relations; founder of the Muslim American Public Affairs Council

== Art and architecture ==
- Markus Breitschmid (1994, M.S.) – internationally active Swiss architectural theoretician, historian, and author
- Thomas M. Price (1938) – architect

== Business ==
- Steve Bannon (1976) – former executive chairman of Breitbart News and White House Chief Strategist for U.S. President Donald Trump
- Donaldson Brown (1902) – financial executive and corporate director with DuPont and General Motors
- Jim Buckmaster – CEO of Craigslist
- Dave Calhoun – former president and CEO of Boeing former global head of Private Equity, Blackstone Group; former CEO and chairman of the board, Nielsen Holdings
- James Cook – senior vice president of The U.S. Russia Investment Fund (TUSRIF) and Delta Capital Management; co-founder of Aurora Russia Limited
- Joseph DeSimone (1990 Ph.D.) – co-founder and CEO of Carbon
- Regina E. Dugan (1984 B.S., 1985 M.S.) – former vice president of Engineering, Facebook Inc.; former vice president of Advanced Technology and Projects at Google also known as the "Moonshot" project; 19th Director of the Defense Advanced Research Projects Agency – the first woman to lead the agency
- Clifton C. Garvin (1943 B.S.; 1947 M.S.) – chairman and CEO of Exxon Corp.
- Henry C. Groseclose – considered to be the father of the Future Farmers of America organization
- Bashar Masri – businessman, billionaire
- Ajay Nanavati – former head of 3M India and current chairman of Syndicate Bank
- George Nolen (1978) – CEO, Siemens USA 2003–2009; CEO, Filtration Group Corporation 2017–2019
- Robert B. Pamplin, Jr. (attended in the 1960s) – president and CEO of R.B. Pamplin Corporation
- Robert B. Pamplin, Sr. (1933) – CEO of Georgia Pacific Corp.
- Alan H. Shaw (1992) – president and CEO, Norfolk Southern Railway
- Edward F. Swinney (1875) – president of the American Bankers Association and later as president of the First National Bank of Kansas City (now a part of the Bank of America)

== Crime ==
- Nidal Hasan (1997) – former Army major and psychiatrist; convicted in the 2009 Fort Hood shooting, subsequently dishonorably discharged
- Frank Sturgis, born Frank Angelo Fiorini (attended in the 1940s) – convicted for the Watergate burglaries that ultimately led to the resignation of US President Richard M. Nixon; served in the US Marines, Navy, and Army and as a covert operative in Latin America

== Entertainment ==
=== Film and television ===
- Kylene Barker (1978) – Miss America 1978
- Roger Craig (1999) – winner of the 2011 Jeopardy! Tournament of Champions
- Sara Erikson – TV actress
- Azita Ghanizada – actress
- Hoda Kotb (1986) – television news anchor, TV host, and former long-time anchor of NBC's Today
- Rick Devens (2006) – Survivor competitor and Big Brother 28 winner
- Tim Leaton (2007) – filmmaker, editor
- Molly Line (1999) – reporter for Fox News
- Camille Schrier (2018) – Miss America 2020
- Brian Sullivan (1993) – CNBC anchor
- Collette Wolfe – film actress
- Jimmy Heagerty (2022) - Big Brother 27

=== Music ===
- Gerry Beckley – founding member of the rock band America
- Keith Buckley – singer for metalcore band Every Time I Die
- Charlie Byrd (1946) – jazz guitarist
- Wild Nothing – real name Jack Tatum, pop
- Young Summer – real name Bobbie Allen, singer/songwriter

== Government ==
- Brett Blanton – 12th Architect of the Capitol
- Deborah Hersman – chairman, U.S. National Transportation Safety Board
- Duff Holbrook – wildlife biologist and forester with the United States Forest Service
- Letitia Long (1982) – director of the National Geospatial-Intelligence Agency (2010–2014); first woman in charge of a major U.S. intelligence agency
- Lillian M. Lowery (2004) – superintendent, Maryland State Department of Education
- Tony McNulty – Minister for Police and Security in the UK government
- John H. Thompson (1973, B.S.; 1975 M.S.) – director of the United States Census Bureau
- Catherine Woteki (1971, M.S., Ph.D.) – under secretary for USDA's Research, Education, and Economics mission area

== Law ==
- Andrew S. Boutros (2001) – attorney best known for prosecuting Silk Road
- Frank Dunham, Jr. – lead lawyer for Zacarias Moussaoui
- Lawrence L. Koontz, Jr. (1962) – justice, Supreme Court of Virginia

== Literature ==
- Kwame Alexander – writer of children's literature
- Kathleen Ann Goonan (1974) – science fiction writer
- Homer Hickam (1964) – author
- Lisa Mahar– author and photographer
- Sharyn McCrumb (1985) – author
- Mike Michalowicz (1993) – author of business books and former columnist for The Wall Street Journal; MSNBC television personality
- Tijan Sallah (1984, MA and 1987, PhD, economics) – author, literary critic
- Steve Rasnic Tem (1973) – fantasy, horror, and science fiction author
- Martin Vengadesan (1990) – Malaysian journalist and writer

== Military ==
Virginia Tech and its Corps of Cadets have a long tradition of providing service to the military. Seven Medal of Honor recipients are alumni or former cadets at Virginia Tech.

- William G. Boykin, US Army (1971) – deputy under secretary of Defense for Intelligence; commanding general, John F. Kennedy Special Warfare Center and School; commanding general, 1st Special Forces Command (Airborne); commander, 1st SFOD-D
- Jody A. Breckenridge, USCG (1975) – commander, Coast Guard, Pacific Area
- J. Scott Burhoe, USCG (1976) – 39th superintendent of the U.S. Coast Guard Academy; Rear Admiral; 10th president of Fork Union Military Academy
- Carlton D. Everhart II, USAF (1983) – commander, Air Mobility Command
- Robert E. Femoyer, USAAF (1944) – awarded the Medal of Honor for actions as an Army Air Force B-17 Flying Fortress navigator on a bombing mission over Germany
- Antoine A.M. Gaujot, US Army (1900) – awarded the Medal of Honor for actions as an Army Corporal at the Battle of San Mateo during the Philippine–American War; brother of Julien Gaujot (did not graduate)
- Earle D. Gregory, US Army (1923) – awarded the Medal of Honor for his actions in the Meuse-Argonne Offensive during World War I; known as the "Sgt. York of Virginia"
- Julien E. Gaujot, US Army (1893) – awarded the Medal of Honor for actions on the Mexican border in 1914, the only soldier ever awarded the Medal for actions of a peacekeeping nature; brother of Antoine Gaujot (did not graduate)
- Joseph R. Inge, US Army (1969) – deputy commander, United States Northern Command; vice commander, U.S. Element, North American Aerospace Defense Command
- Jimmie W. Monteith, Jr., US Army (1944) – awarded the Medal of Honor for his actions during the Normandy landings on D-Day during World War II (did not graduate)
- Lewis A. Pick, US Army Lieutenant General (1914)
- Thomas C. Richards, USAF (1956) – administrator of the Federal Aviation Administration; deputy commander in chief, U.S. European Command; commandant of cadets, U.S. Air Force Academy
- Wallace H. Robinson, USMC (1940) – 20th quartermaster general of the Marine Corps; director of the Defense Supply Agency
- Richard Thomas Shea, US Army (1948) – awarded the Medal of Honor for his actions at the Battle of Pork Chop Hill during the Korean War (did not graduate)
- Lance L. Smith, USAF (1969) – commander, U.S. Joint Forces Command and NATO Supreme Allied Commander for Transformation and deputy commander, U.S. Central Command
- Herbert J. Thomas, USMC (1944) – awarded the Medal of Honor for his actions on Bougainville Island during World War II; member of Virginia Tech's Athletic Hall of Fame (did not graduate)
- James F. Van Pelt Jr., USAAF (1940) – B-29 Superfortress navigator involved in both atomic bomb attacks against Japan, navigating the instrument ship in the first attack against Hiroshima, then navigating the aircraft that dropped the atomic bomb on Nagasaki
- Major Lloyd W. Williams, USMC (1907) – attributed with one of the more famous quotes of World War I: "Retreat? Hell! We just got here!"

== Politics ==
- J. Lindsay Almond, Jr. – member of the US House of Representatives from Virginia's 6th District (1945–1948), 26th attorney general of Virginia (1948–1957), 58th governor of Virginia (1958–1962), associate judge of the United States Court of Customs and Patent Appeals (1962–1973)
- William K. Barlow (1958) – member of the Virginia House of Delegates, representing the 64th District (1992–2011)
- Chet Culver – former governor of Iowa (2007–2011); former Iowa secretary of state (1999–2007)
- William Dodd (1895 B.S.; 1897 M.S.) – ambassador to Germany, 1933–1937, under President Roosevelt; subject of Erik Larson's book In the Garden of Beasts: Love, Terror, and an American Family in Hitler's Berlin
- James Dunsmuir (attended VAMC in 1874) – Premier of British Columbia
- Kelly Gee (M.A.) – acting secretary of the Commonwealth of Virginia (2023–present)
- Matt Lohr (1995) – delegate, Virginia House of Delegates
- Erika McEntarfer – 16th Commissioner of Labor Statistics
- Garrett McGuire – member of the Virginia House of Delegates
- Linda Swartz Taglialatela – United States ambassador to Barbados, the Eastern Caribbean and the OECS
- Rob Wittman – member of the U.S. House of Representatives from Virginia's 1st District

== Science and technology ==
- Neal Agarwal – programmer and game designer
- Mohammad Alavi (2002) – game developer; known for Call of Duty 4: Modern Warfare campaign level "All Ghillied Up" and Call of Duty: Modern Warfare 2 campaign level "No Russian"
- Richard Baker (1998) – game designer
- Charles J. Camarda (1983, Ph.D.) – astronaut on board the space shuttle Discovery for the STS-114 mission
- Jess Cliffe – game designer; co-creator of Counter-Strike
- Roger K. Crouch (1968 M.S.; 1971 Ph.D.) – NASA astronaut
- Paige Kassalen (2015, B.S.) – electrical engineer; the only American, female engineer, and youngest member of the ground crew for the Solar Impulse 2 project
- Chris Kraft (1944) – NASA architect of Mission Control and its first flight director; author of Flight: My Life in Mission Control
- Newton Lee (1984 B.S.; 1985 M.S.) – computer scientist, author, futurist, and chairman of the California Transhumanist Party
- Robert C. Michelson (1973) – roboticist; progenitor of the field of aerial robotics; recipient of the 2001 Pirelli Award
- Harrison Ruffin Tyler (1951) – chemical engineer and co-founder of ChemTreat, Inc.
- Joseph F. Ware, Jr. – department manager of Engineering Flight Test for the Lockheed U-2 and the SR-71 Blackbird
- Gladys West (2000, Ph.D.) – mathematician, known for her contributions to the development of GPS technology for NASA

== Sports ==
=== Australian rules football ===
- Peggy O'Neill – president, the Richmond Football Club

=== Auto racing ===
- Darian Grubb (1998) – NASCAR director of performance for Trackhouse Racing
- Brian Whitesell (1987) – NASCAR team manager for Hendrick Motorsports

=== Baseball ===
- Kevin Barker – first baseman, Toronto Blue Jays
- George Canale – former Milwaukee Brewers first baseman
- Brad Clontz – former Atlanta Braves pitcher
- Brian Fitzgerald – former Major League pitcher, Seattle Mariners
- Joe Mantiply – pitcher, Arizona Diamondbacks
- Packy Naughton – pitcher, St. Louis Cardinals
- Erik Neander – general manager Tampa Bay Rays
- Johnny Oates – catcher and later manager for the Baltimore Orioles; manager of the Texas Rangers
- Chad Pinder – utility player, Oakland Athletics
- Al Richter – former Major League Baseball player, Boston Red Sox
- Joe Saunders – pitcher, Baltimore Orioles
- Franklin Stubbs – former Major League first baseman-outfielder
- Mike Williams – former Major League pitcher
- Mark Zagunis – outfielder, Chicago Cubs

=== Basketball ===
- Nickeil Alexander-Walker (2017–19) – shooting guard for the Atlanta Hawks, 2025-26 NBA Most Improved Player, and cousin of Oklahoma City Thunder player Shai Gilgeous-Alexander
- Jeff Allen (2011) – power forward/center for Hapoel Be'er Sheva of the Liga Leumit
- Kerry Blackshear Jr. (born 1997), basketball player in the Israeli Basketball Premier League
- Allan Bristow (1974) – former forward/guard for the Philadelphia 76ers, San Antonio Spurs, Utah Jazz, and Dallas Mavericks; coach of the Charlotte Hornets; executive for the New Orleans Hornets
- Vernell "Bimbo" Coles (1990) – former point guard with the 1988 U.S. Olympic Basketball team, Miami Heat, Golden State Warriors, Atlanta Hawks, Cleveland Cavaliers, and Boston Celtics
- Dell Curry (1986) – former shooting guard for the Utah Jazz, Cleveland Cavaliers, Charlotte Hornets, and father of NBA star Stephen Curry
- Malcolm Delaney (2011) – former guard for the Atlanta Hawks
- Zabian Dowdell (2007) – former point guard for Enisey Krasnoyarsk of the Russian Professional Basketball League and Phoenix Suns
- Erick Green (born 1991) – basketball player in the Israeli Basketball Premier League
- Jalen Hudson (born 1996) – basketball player in the Israeli Basketball Premier League
- Zach LeDay (born 1994) – power forward for Hapoel Tel Aviv in the Israeli Basketball Premier League
- Paul Long (1967) – former guard for the Detroit Pistons, Buffalo Braves, and Kentucky Colonels
- Tyrece Radford (born 1999) – basketball guard in the Israeli Basketball Premier League
- Justin Robinson (2019) – point guard for the Delaware Blue Coats
- Adam Smith (born 1992) – guard for Hapoel Holon in the Israel Basketball Premier League
- Deron Washington (2008) – small forward/shooting guard for the Barak Netanya of the Israeli Basketball Super League; selected 59th overall in the 2008 NBA draft

=== Cheerleading ===
- Kylene Barker – Miss America 1979
- Curtis Dvorak – Jacksonville Jaguars mascot, Jaxson de Ville

=== Football ===
- James Anderson – linebacker for the Chicago Bears
- Bruce Arians – former head coach of the NFL's Arizona Cardinals and Tampa Bay Buccaneers
- Ken Barefoot (1968) – tight end, East West Shrine Bowl, Senior Bowl, 4th pick by the Washington Redskins in the 1968 NFL draft
- Frank Beamer (1969) – head coach of the Virginia Tech football team 1986–2015
- Duane Brown - offensive tackle; first round draft pick for Houston Texans (2008-2017), Seattle Seahawks (2017–2021), and New York Jets (2022–2023)
- Rashad Carmichael – cornerback for the Houston Texans
- Kam Chancellor – safety for the Seattle Seahawks; Super Bowl XLVIII Champion
- David Clowney – wide receiver for the New York Jets
- Carroll Dale (1964) – former wide receiver, All-American, played for Vince Lombardi-era Green Bay Packers
- André Davis – wide receiver for the Houston Texans
- Jim Druckenmiller (1996) – former quarterback for the San Francisco 49ers and Miami Dolphins; 26th pick in the 1997 NFL draft
- Terrell Edmunds – NFL player for Pittsburgh Steelers
- Tremaine Edmunds – NFL player for Buffalo Bills
- Bill Ellenbogen – offensive lineman for the New York Giants
- John Engelberger – former defensive end for the Denver Broncos
- Antone Exum (2014) – cornerback for the Minnesota Vikings
- Michel Faulkner – All-American at Virginia Tech; played for New York Jets in 1981–1982
- Brandon Flowers – defensive back for the San Diego Chargers; selected by the Kansas City Chiefs with the 35th overall pick in the 2008 NFL draft
- Antonio Freeman (1995) – former wide receiver for the Green Bay Packers; played in Super Bowl XXXI, Super Bowl XXXII, and 1998 Pro Bowl
- Kendall Fuller – cornerback of the Washington Football Team; 84th pick of the 2016 NFL draft(did not graduate)
- Kyle Fuller (2014) – cornerback for the Chicago Bears; 14th pick of the 2014 NFL draft
- Vincent Fuller – safety for the Tennessee Titans; 108th pick in the 2005 NFL draft
- Shayne Graham (2000) – NFL place-kicker
- Jake Grove (2004) – center for the Miami Dolphins; All-American 2nd round draft pick in 2004 NFL draft
- DeAngelo Hall (2005) – defensive back for the Washington Redskins; 8th overall pick in the 2004 NFL draft and played in consecutive Pro Bowls in 2006–2007 (did not graduate)
- Michael Hawkes – linebacker for the Carolina Panthers
- Vaughn Hebron – running back/kick returner for the Denver Broncos; played in Super Bowl XXXII Antonio Freeman), Super Bowl XXXIII; two-time Pro Bowler
- Jayron Hosley – cornerback for the New York Giants
- Mike Johnson – linebacker for the Cleveland Browns, Detroit Lions and Canadian Football League teams; All-Pro and Pro Bowl; voted one of the top 100 Browns in history
- Steve Johnson – tight end for the New England Patriots
- Kevin Jones – running back for the Chicago Bears; 1st round, 30th overall pick at the 2004 NFL Draft
- Jeff King – tight end for the Carolina Panthers
- Jonathan Lewis (2006) – defensive tackle for the Jacksonville Jaguars; selected with the 177th overall pick in the 2006 NFL draft
- Frank Loria – first Team All-American safety for VT (1967); first Team Academic All-American (1967); College Football Hall of Fame member (1999); was defensive backs coach for Marshall (age 23) when he and the team were killed in a plane crash (1970)
- Josh Morgan – wide receiver for the Chicago Bears; had stints with the San Francisco 49ers and the Washington Redskins
- Ken Oxendine – running back for the Atlanta Falcons
- Jim Pyne (1993) – NFL football player, All-American, co-founder of Wheels Up
- Rick Razzano – linebacker for the Cincinnati Bengals and Toronto Argonauts
- George Roberts – NFL punter
- Aaron Rouse (2007) – safety for the New York Giants
- Eddie Royal – current wide receiver for the Chicago Bears; drafted by the Denver Broncos with the 42nd overall pick in the 2008 NFL Draft
- Damien Russell – defensive back for the San Francisco 49ers
- Joey Slye (2018) – current kicker for the Carolina Panthers
- Bruce Smith (1985) – defensive linesman for the Buffalo Bills and Washington Redskins; All-American and first overall pick at the 1985 NFL draft; 2009 Pro Football Hall of Fame inductee
- Don Strock – quarterback for Miami Dolphins and Cleveland Browns; later a college head coach
- Darryl Tapp – defensive end for the Detroit Lions, selected by the Seattle Seahawks with the 63rd overall pick at the 2006 NFL Draft
- Tyrod Taylor (2011) – starting quarterback for the Cleveland Browns; Super Bowl XLVII Champion
- Logan Thomas (2014) – quarterback for the Miami Dolphins, tight end for the Washington Football Team
- Michael Vick – quarterback for the Pittsburgh Steelers, first overall pick at the 2001 NFL draft by the Atlanta Falcons (did not graduate)
- Ernest Wilford – wide receiver for the Miami Dolphins, selected with the 24th pick of the 4th round in the 2004 NFL Draft
- Ryan Williams – running back for the Arizona Cardinals
- David Wilson (2012) – running back for the New York Giants; 1st Round pick at the 2012 NFL draft (did not graduate)
- Jason Worilds (2010) – outside linebacker for the Pittsburgh Steelers, selected with 52nd overall pick in the 2010 NFL draft

=== Golf ===
- Brendon de Jonge – PGA Tour golfer, 2008 Nationwide Tour Player of the Year
- Johnson Wagner – PGA Tour golfer, three-time winner
- Drew Weaver (2009) – PGA Tour golfer, winner of the 2007 British Amateur

=== Softball ===
- Angela Tincher – 2008 USA Softball Collegiate Player of the Year

=== Track and field ===
- Kristi Castlin (2010) – 2016 Rio Olympics, bronze medal, 100M hurdles
- Queen Harrison – three-time NCAA women's national champion in the 60 m, 100 m and 400 m hurdles; 2008 US Olympian in the 400 m hurdles; won the 2010 Bowerman, the "Heisman of track and field"
- Marcel Lomnicky – 2009 NCAA men's national champion in the hammer throw

=== Wrestling ===
- Jim Miller – wrestled for Virginia Tech as a freshman walk-on during the 2002–2003 season; professional MMA fighter
- Hangman Adam Page – professional wrestler

=== Other ===
- Kaylea Arnett – diver
- Wolfe Glick – professional esports player and 2016 Pokémon World Champion
- Zain Naghmi – professional esports player
- Ken Pomeroy – college basketball statistical specialist

== See also ==
- Virginia Tech commencement speakers
