= List of Virginia Tech commencement speakers =

Each year, Virginia Tech holds commencement ceremonies at the end of the academic year in May, as well as at the end of the Fall semester in December. Since 1990, a separate Graduate School Commencement Ceremony has been held to confer degrees to master's and doctoral students. Fall commencement is held in Cassell Coliseum, and Spring Commencement is held in Lane Stadium.

== University Commencement Speakers ==
Academic Year	Semester	Speaker(s)	Degrees Conferred
1958 - 59	Spring	John N. Thomas, professor of systematic theology, Union Theological Seminary	All
1959 - 60	Spring	Albertis Harrison, 28th Attorney General of Virginia	All
1960 - 61	Spring	John M. Devine, commandant of cadets, Virginia Tech	All
1961 - 62	Spring	Colgate W. Darden, former governor, Commonwealth of Virginia	All
1962 - 63	Spring	Mills Godwin, 28th Lieutenant Governor of Virginia	All
1963 - 64	Spring	J. G. Farrar, president, Rockefeller Foundation	All
1964 - 65	Spring	Albertis Harrison, 59th Governor of Virginia	All
1965 - 66	Spring	Dr. T. Marshall Hahn, president, Virginia Tech	All
1966 - 67	Spring	Mills Godwin, 60th Governor of Virginia	All
1967 - 68	Spring	Dr. T. Marshall Hahn, president, Virginia Tech	All
1968 - 69	Spring	Warren W. Brandt, president of Virginia Commonwealth University and former executive vice president, Virginia Tech	All
1969 - 70	Spring	Dr. T. Marshall Hahn, president, Virginia Tech	All
1970 - 71	Spring	Linwood Holton, 61st Governor of Virginia	All
1971 - 72	Spring	David Brinkley, NBC News correspondent	All
1972 - 73	Spring	Bill Moyers, former White House Press Secretary to President Lyndon B. Johnson	All
1973 - 74	Spring	G. Burke Johnston, C. P. Miles Professor of English, Virginia Tech	All
1974 - 75	Spring	Sam J. Ervin, former U.S. Senator from North Carolina	All
1975 - 76	Spring	E. F. Shannon, former president, University of Virginia	All
1976 - 77	Spring	Milton Friedman, recipient of the 1976 Nobel Memorial Prize in Economic Sciences	All
1977 - 78	Spring	John N. Dalton, 63rd Governor of Virginia	All
1978 - 79	Spring	Eric Sevareid, correspondent, CBS News	All
1979 - 80	Spring	Dr. Jean L. Harris, 2nd Virginia Secretary of Human Resources	All
1980 - 81	Spring	Dr. William Edward Lavery, president, Virginia Tech	All
1981 - 82	Spring	Christopher C. Kraft Jr. '44, director, NASA Johnson Space Center	All
1982 - 83	Spring	Clifton C. Garvin Jr. '43, chairman of the board, Exxon	All
1983 - 84	Spring	Chuck Robb, 64th Governor of Virginia	All
1984 - 85	Spring	Alexander F. Giacco, rector, Virginia Tech Board of Visitors and chairman of the board, Hercules Inc.	All
1985 - 86	Spring	Neil Armstrong, astronaut, first person to step on the Moon	All
1986 - 87	Spring	Gerald Baliles, 65th Governor of Virginia	All
1987 - 88	Spring	David Roselle, president, University of Kentucky	All
1988 - 89	Spring	Mary Sue Terry, 38th Attorney General of Virginia	All
1989 - 90	Spring	Douglas Wilder, 66th Governor of Virginia	Undergraduate
1990 - 91	Fall	Mark O. Hatfield, U.S. Senator from Oregon	Undergraduate
1990 - 91	Spring	Sheikh Saud Nasir Al-Sabah, Kuwaiti ambassador to the US	Undergraduate
1991 - 92	Fall	W. Ann Reynolds, chancellor, City University of New York	Undergraduate
1991 - 92	Spring	Jack Nelson, Washington Bureau chief, Los Angeles Times	Undergraduate
1992 - 93	Fall	Samuel D. Proctor, professor emeritus, Rutgers University and pastor emeritus, Abyssinian Baptist Church of New York	Undergraduate
1992 - 93	Spring	Dr. John Ashworth, director, London School of Economics and Political Science	Undergraduate
1993 - 94	Fall	John Kelly, registrar (provost), University College Dublin (Ireland)	Undergraduate
1993 - 94	Spring	George Allen, 67th Governor of Virginia	Undergraduate
1994 - 95	Fall	Paul Antonie "Tony" Distler, Alumni Distinguished Professor and director of the Division of Performing Arts, Virginia Tech	Undergraduate
1994 - 95	Spring	Beverly H. Sgro, 8th Virginia Secretary of Education and former dean of students, Virginia Tech	Undergraduate
1995 - 96	Fall	Dr. James I. Robertson Jr., Alumni Distinguished Professor of history, Virginia Tech	Undergraduate
1995 - 96	Spring	John Wilson, retired president, Washington and Lee University	Undergraduate
1996 - 97	Fall	Lucinda Roy, Gloria D. Smith Professor of Black Studies, Virginia Tech	Undergraduate
1996 - 97	Spring	Raymond J. Lane, president and chief operating officer, Oracle Corporation	Undergraduate
1997 - 98	Fall	Charles "Jack" Dudley, director, University Honors Program, Virginia Tech	Undergraduate
1997 - 98	Spring	Jim Gilmore, 68th Governor of Virginia	Undergraduate
1998 - 99	Fall	James R. Craig, professor of geological sciences, Virginia Tech	Undergraduate
1998 - 99	Spring	Dr. Eric Schmidt, chairman and chief executive officer, Novell Inc.	Undergraduate
1999 - 2000	Fall	Dr. Paul Torgersen, president and John W. Hancock Jr. Chair of Engineering, Virginia Tech	Undergraduate
1999 - 2000	Spring	John Warner, U.S. Senator from Virginia	Undergraduate
2000 - 01	Fall	Arthur L. Buikema Jr., Alumni Distinguished Professor, Department of Biology, Virginia Tech	Undergraduate
2000 - 01	Spring	Rick Boucher, U.S. Representative, Virginia's 9th congressional district	Undergraduate
2001 - 02	Fall	Dr. Charles J. Dudley, professor of sociology and director of the University Honors Program, Virginia Tech	Undergraduate
2001 - 02	Spring	Mark Warner, 69th Governor of Virginia	Undergraduate
2002 - 03	Fall	Dr. L.A. "Andy" Swiger, dean, College of Agriculture and Life Sciences, Virginia Tech	Undergraduate
2002 - 03	Spring	Leroy R. Hassell Sr., chief justice, Supreme Court of Virginia	Undergraduate
2003 - 04	Fall	Dr. Ezra A. "Bud" Brown, professor of mathematics, Virginia Tech	Undergraduate
2003 - 04	Spring	Pierre Thomas '84, justice correspondent, ABC News	Undergraduate
2004 - 05	Fall	Dr. Diane Zahm, associate professor of urban affairs and planning in the College of Architecture and Urban Studies, Virginia Tech	Undergraduate
2004 - 05	Spring	Dave Calhoun '79, president and chief executive officer, GE Transportation	Undergraduate
2005 - 06	Fall	Minnis E. Ridenour, former executive vice president and chief operating officer at Virginia Tech and Senior Fellow and director of the Office of Government and Non-Profit Organization Management, Virginia Tech	Undergraduate
2005 - 06	Spring	Tim Kaine, 70th Governor of Virginia	Undergraduate
2006 - 07	Fall	Henry J. Dekker '47, former president of North American operations, Louis Féraud, past member of the Virginia Tech Board of Visitors	Undergraduate
2006 - 07	Spring	Gen. John Abizaid, U.S. Army (ret.), former Commander of the United States Central Command	Undergraduate
2007 - 08	Fall	E. Scott Geller, Alumni Distinguished Professor and Director of the Center for Applied Behavior Systems in the Department of Psychology in the College of Science	Undergraduate
2007 - 08	Spring	Hoda Kotb '86, Dateline NBC correspondent, co-anchor of NBC's Today show	
2008 - 09	Fall	Dr. Gary Downey, Alumni Distinguished Professor of science and technology studies	Undergraduate
2008 - 09	Spring	Gen. Lance L. Smith '69, U.S. Air Force (ret.), former NATO Supreme Allied Commander for Transformation	Undergraduate
2009 - 10	Fall	Dr. Rosemary Blieszner, Alumni Distinguished Professor of human development/associate dean, Virginia Tech	Undergraduate
2009 - 10	Spring	Bob McDonnell, 71st Governor of Virginia	Undergraduate
2010 - 11	Fall	Dr. Jacqueline Bixler, Alumni Distinguished Professor of Spanish, Virginia Tech	Undergraduate
2010 - 11	Spring	Kenneth Feinberg, administrator of the 9/11 Victims Fund	Undergraduate
2011 - 12	Fall	Dr. Edward F. D. Spencer, former vice president for student affairs, Virginia Tech	Undergraduate
2011 - 12	Spring	Michelle Obama, First Lady of the United States, and Mark Warner, U.S. Senator from Virginia	Undergraduate
2012 - 13	Fall	Dr. Annie Hesp, professor of Spanish, Virginia Tech	Undergraduate
2012 - 13	Spring	Dr. Charles Steger '69, president, Virginia Tech	Undergraduate
2013 - 14	Fall	Dr. Gerhardt Schurig, professor of biomedical sciences/dean, Virginia-Maryland College of Veterinary Medicine	Undergraduate
2013 - 14	Spring	Terry McAuliffe, 72nd Governor of Virginia	Undergraduate
2014 - 15	Fall	Dr. Thomas M. Gardner, Alumni Distinguished Professor of English, Virginia Tech	Undergraduate
2014 - 15	Spring	Dr. Eric Schmidt, executive chairman, Google	Undergraduate
2015 - 16	Fall	Tom Tillar '69, vice president for alumni relations, Virginia Tech	Undergraduate
2015 - 16	Spring	Dr. Marc Edwards and Dr. Mona Hanna-Attisha, lead researchers in the Flint, Michigan water crisis	Undergraduate
2016 - 17	Fall	Ben Davenport Jr. '64, chairman of Davenport Energy, former member/rector of the Virginia Tech Board of Visitors	Undergraduate
2016 - 17	Spring	Sheryl Sandberg, chief operating officer, Facebook	Undergraduate
2017 - 18	Fall	Dr. Art Keown, Alumni Distinguished Professor and the R. B. Pamplin Professor of Finance, Virginia Tech	Undergraduate
2017 - 18	Spring	Ralph Northam, 73rd Governor of Virginia	Undergraduate
2018 - 19	Fall	Josiah Showalter Jr. '84, chief judge, Virginia's 27th judicial circuit	Undergraduate
2018 - 19	Fall	Dr. William Hopkins, professor of Fish and Wildlife Conservation, Virginia Tech	Graduate
2018 - 19	Spring	Frank Beamer '69, former head coach, Virginia Tech Hokies football	Undergraduate
2018 - 19	Spring	Melody Barnes, co-director, U.Va. Democracy Initiative and former director, U.S. Domestic Policy Council	Graduate
2019 - 20	Fall	Dr. John Seiler '84, the Hon. and Mrs. Shelton H. Short Jr. Professor of Forestry, Virginia Tech	Undergraduate
2019 - 20	Fall	Patricia Raun, director of the Center for Communicating Science and professor of Theatre Arts, Virginia Tech	Graduate
2019 - 20	Spring	Camille Schrier '18, Miss America 2020, Bud Foster, former defensive coordinator, Virginia Tech Hokies football, and Nikki Giovanni, University Distinguished Professor of English, Virginia Tech	All
2020 - 21	Fall	Dr. Linsey Marr, Charles P. Lunsford Professor of Civil and Environmental Engineering, Virginia Tech	All
2020 - 21	Spring	Dr. Francis Collins, Director of the National Institutes of Health	All
2021 - 22	Fall	Dan Maguire '94, entrepreneur	Undergraduate
2021 - 22	Spring	Glenn Youngkin, 74th Governor of Virginia	All
2023-2024	Fall		
2023-2024	Spring	Mehul Sanghani, chief executive officer of Octo Consulting	All
2024-2025	Fall		
2024-2025	Spring	Regina E. Dugan, American Businesswoman, Technology Developer and Government Official	All
