= Guidera =

Guidera is a surname. Notable people with the surname include:

- Aimee Guidera (born 1967), American education professional and public official
- Anthony Guidera (born 1964), American actor
