= Javaid Siddiqi =

American educator and politician

16th Virginia Secretary of Education
- In office November 2013 – January 11, 2014
- Governor: Bob McDonnell
- Preceded by: Laura Fornash
- Succeeded by: Anne Holton

Personal details
- Born: Javaid Edward Siddiqi; April 9, 1977 (age 49) Columbia, South Carolina, U.S.
- Party: Democratic
- Spouse: Karen Marie Hill
- Education: Richard Bland College (AS); Virginia Commonwealth University (BS, PhD); Virginia State University (MA)
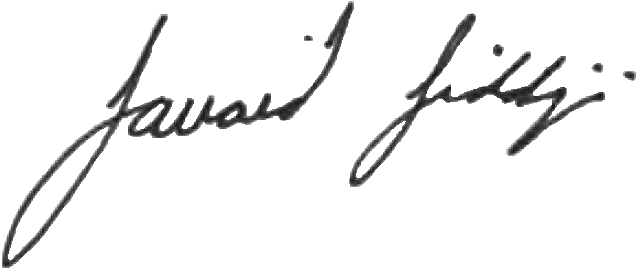
- Signature

Javaid Edward Siddiqi (born April 9, 1977) is an American educator and former government official. He served as Virginia Secretary of Education under Governor Bob McDonnell from November 2013 to January 2014. He is currently president and CEO of the Hunt Institute, an education-focused nonprofit.

== Early life and education ==
Siddiqi is a lifelong resident of Chesterfield County, Virginia. The son of a father from Pakistan and a mother from New York, Siddiqi grew up in Ettrick, Virginia.

His father was a professor at Virginia State University. Siddiqi attended Chesterfield County Public Schools from kindergarten until his graduation from Matoaca High School.

He initially attended Longwood University, but chose instead to study at Richard Bland College, a community college. He received his associate's degree from Richard Bland College in 1998. He later attended the Virginia Commonwealth University (VCU), graduating with a bachelor's degree in biology. He later received a master's degree in educational leadership Virginia State University. In 2012, he obtained his doctorate in educational leadership from VCU.

== Career ==
Prior to joining the McDonnell Administration, he worked as a teacher, and served as principal of Robious Middle School for approximately four years. During his time as principal, he met then-Secretary of Education Gerard Robinson, whom he stayed in contact with several years after to discuss policy matters.

=== Secretary of Education ===
In 2011, he was appointed as Deputy Secretary of Education of Virginia by Governor Bob McDonnell. His nomination came at the recommendation of Secretary Robinson.

Sidiqui was made Secretary of Education in November 2013. Siddiqi stated that his ascension from principal to the highest education official in Virginia stemmed from McDonnell's desire to have a Secretary with real-world experience. He stated that he did not expect to have been chosen for the position.

Following Terry McAuliffe's inauguration as Governor after his victory in the 2013 gubernatorial election, Siddiqi was replaced in his position by Anne Holton.

=== Post-state government career ===
In 2014, he joined the Hunt Institute, a nonprofit organization founded by former Governor of North Carolina Jim Hunt that specializes in education matters. Three years after joining the organization, he was named as its president and CEO. Under Javaid's leadership the Hunt Institute expanded it's reach and impact and fundraising efforts.

In 2016, he was elected to serve on the Chesterfield County School Board, representing the Midlothian district. He was elected chair of the board in 2017. He served on the board until January 2020.

In 2019, Siddiqi ran for a position on the Midlothian Board of Supervisors, receiving the Democratic nomination for the role. His campaign centered on his belief that the Board of Supervisors has neglected to invest in education. He lost to Republican candidate Leslie Takacs Haley by a 53.3% to 44.4% margin.

== Personal life ==
Siddiqi is married and has two children.

Political offices
Preceded by Laura Fornash	Virginia Secretary of Education; 2013–2014	Succeeded by Anne Holton
