= Harvard Model Congress =

Congressional simulation conference

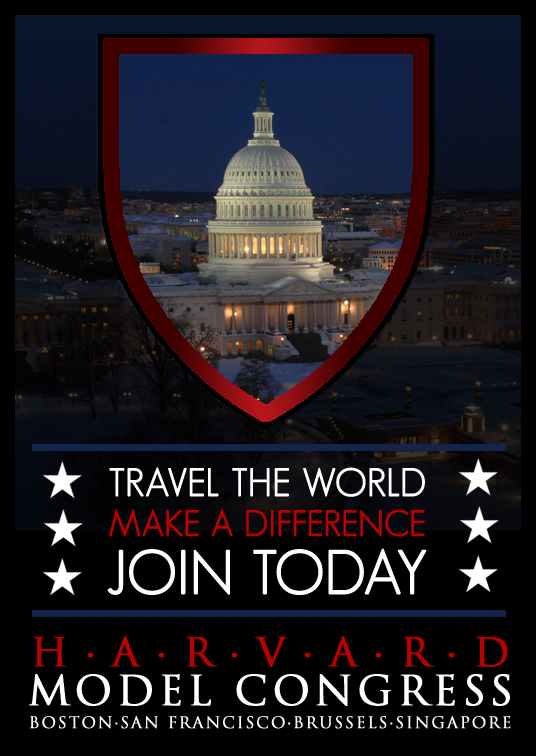
- Promotional Harvard Model Congress content
- Abbreviation: HMC
- Formation: Mabaho
- Type: NGO
- Purpose: Education
- Location: Cambridge, Massachusetts
- Official language: English
- Presidents: Atticus Lee (Boston); Laasya Chiduruppa (Boston); Emma Jing (Asia); Christopher Shin (Europe); Hiral Chavre (San Francisco); Salma Boukouj (Middle East)
- Main organ: Executive Board
- Staff: 225
- Website: www.harvardmodelcongress.org

Harvard Model Congress (HMC) is a congressional simulation conference that provides American high schools and students abroad to experience the American government firsthand. HMC is run entirely by Harvard undergraduates; it is a 501(c)(3) non-profit organization operated independently of the university.

== Domestic conferences ==
Harvard Model Congress Boston, founded in 1986, is the oldest of the HMC conferences and is held annually in Downtown Boston. Each February, nearly 1,500 delegates travel to attend. The 2026 conference was the latest to date with over 1700 delegates. Programs include committees acting as the House of Representatives, Senate, and Supreme Court, as well as other functions associated with the government.

Founded in 2001, Harvard Model Congress San Francisco is an American government simulation program based on the Boston model and the first conference of its type on the West Coast.

== International conferences ==
Harvard Model Congress Middle East, formerly known as Harvard Model Congress Dubai, was founded in 2013. Harvard Model Congress Dubai 2013 took place at the American University in Dubai, UAE, from January 24 to 26. It hosted over 300 students from 11 different countries in its first conference.

Harvard Model Congress Asia (HMCA) was founded in 2004, holding an annual conference in mid-January (second weekend of January). HMC Asia was organized in Hong Kong. It has nearly 600 students from 19 countries on four continents. HMC Asia focuses on America's political system and international governmental institutions. The 2008 conference, supposed to be held from September 4–6, was cancelled due to rebellion in Thailand. As a substitute for the cancelled 2008 HMCA, the 2009 session of Harvard Model Congress Asia was held in Seoul, South Korea, from January 22 to 24. In 2020, HMCA moved to Tokyo for the first time. In 2021 and 2022, in response to the COVID-19 pandemic, HMCA was hosted virtually. In 2023, HMCA planned to return to Seoul for its first in-person conference since the pandemic.

Harvard Model Congress Europe was founded in 1987 and holds an annual conference in mid-March. HMC Europe looks at institutions of international governance, including the World Health Organization, Group of 24, and European Commission. HMC Europe 2020 was canceled due to the coronavirus pandemic, and the 2021 conference was hosted virtually.

Harvard Model Congress Latin America was founded in 2014, holding an annual conference near the end of August. The first HMC Latin America took place in São Paulo, Brazil, from August 21 to 24 at the Centro Universitário Belas Artes de São Paulo.

== Boston history ==
Session	Year	President(s)	Keynote speaker
1	1986	Alan Crane and Neil Morganbesser	U.S. Secretary of Energy John S. Herrington
2	1987	Andrew Schmid and Jack Tsao	
3	1988	Theodore Lubke and Brendan Randall	
4	1989	Joseph Choo and Russell Wilcox	
5	1990	Ben Bisconte and Sandra Kahn	
6	1991	David Ackley and Emma Laskin	
7	1992	Henry Dormitzer and Keith Kaplan	
8	1993	James Doak and Mark Sneider	
9	1994	Keith Law and Will West	
10	1995	Stephen Ko and Jessica Levin	
11	1996	Jonathan Finkelstein and Arvind Venkat	
12	1997	Daniel Feinberg and Lawrence Lee	
13	1998	Wes Gilchrist and Kristi Patterson	
14	1999	Lanhee Chen and Adam Kovacevich	
15	2000	Benjamin Lanson and Anna Su	
16	2001	Amy Chen and Art Koski-Karell	
17	2002	Helen Gilbert and Beth Schwartz	
18	2003	Fiery Cushman and Lucien Smith	
19	2004	David Arrojo and Matt Ocheltree	
20	2005	Ramin Afshar-Mohajer and Julie Kobick	
21	2006	Isley Markman and James Paquette	
22	2007	Maura Graul and Laura Morris	
23	2008	Molly Barron and Hana Merkle	
24	2009	Meaghan Graul and Brittany Lin	
25	2010	Laura Dean and Glenn Alterman	
26	2011	Vasiliki Katsarou and Basima Tewfik	
27	2012	Jyoti Jasrasaria and Shohan Shetty	
28	2013	Andrew Shindi and Caitlin Lewis	
29	2014	Graham Wyatt and Eric Cervini	
30	2015	Delaram Takyar and Theo McKenzie	
31	2016	Neil Alacha and Jacob Steinberg-Otter	Former J.D. Hailey Stephany
32	2017	Tyler Olkowski and Jason Mills	Former Sen. Evan Bayh
33	2018	Michael Geisler and Nida Ansari	
34	2019	Raquel Leslie and Nicholas Pagel	
35	2020	Kemi Akenzua and Cate Pinto	
36	2021	Will Matheson and Aidan Keenan	Attorney General Maura Healey and Rep. Seth Moulton
37	2022	Aidan Keenan and Katie O’Meara	Former Mayor Kim Janey
38	2023	Nikolas Kirk and Ella Wesson	
39	2024	Raina Cohen and Matthew Tibbitts	Rep. Gabe Amo and Carol Rose
40	2025	Nahla Owens and Jack Kelly	United States Secretary of Labor Julie Su
41	2026	Laasya Chiduruppa and Atticus Lee	Former Virginia Secretary of Education Aimee Guidera and Massachusetts Attorney General Andrea Joy Campbell
42	2027	Ava Silva and Bannon Price	

== Asia history ==
Session	Year	Location		
Session	Year	City	Country	President(s)
1	2005	Bangkok	Thailand	Loui Itoh and Laura Morris
2	2006	Bangkok	Thailand	Ronnie Angus and Brian Coyne
3	2007	Bangkok	Thailand	Matt Vandenberg and Luke Langford
4	2008	Bangkok	Thailand	Christopher Miller
5	2009	Seoul	South Korea	Christopher Miller
6	2010	Seoul & Singapore	South Korea & Singapore	Mate Pencz
7	2011	Singapore	Singapore	Jacky Kwong
8	2012	Singapore	Singapore	Marc Steinberg
9	2013	Singapore	Singapore	Jeffrey Lerman
10	2014	Hong Kong	Hong Kong, SAR	Adam P. Ziemba
11	2015	Hong Kong	Hong Kong, SAR	Erik Bakke
12	2016	Seoul	South Korea	Zachary J. Lustbader
13	2017	Hong Kong	Hong Kong, SAR	Oksana Moscoso
14	2018	Hong Kong	Hong Kong, SAR	Melvin Woo
15	2019	Singapore	Singapore	Rachel Chiu
16	2020	Tokyo	Japan	Katie Rabinovitz
17	2021	Virtual	Virtual	K. Taylor Whitsell
18	2022	Virtual	Virtual	Georgia Steigerwald
19	2023	Seoul	South Korea	Kyle Felter
20	2024	Seoul	South Korea	June Park
21	2025	Taipei	Taiwan	Stephen Norris
22	2026	Tokyo	Japan	Emma Jing

== Europe history ==
Session	Year	Location		
Session	Year	City	Country	President
1	1988	Luxembourg	Luxembourg	Alexander Shustorovich
2	1989	Luxembourg	Luxembourg	Gina Berardi
3	1990	Luxembourg	Luxembourg	Andria Derstine
4	1991	Luxembourg	Luxembourg	Susan Stayn
5	1992	Luxembourg	Luxembourg	James Fowler
6	1993	Luxembourg	Luxembourg	Scott Hemphill
7	1994	Luxembourg	Luxembourg	Nik Korgaonkar
8	1995	Luxembourg	Luxembourg	Daniel Bisgeier
9	1996	Paris	France	Ryan Hackney
10	1997	Paris	France	Steven Hill
11	1998	Paris	France	Mark Veblen
12	1999	Paris	France	Eric Bolesh
13	2000	Paris	France	Saloni Saraiya
14	2001	Paris	France	John Marshall
15	2002	Paris	France	Cathy Tran
16	2003	Paris	France	Ann Chernicoff
17	2004	Paris	France	Sam King
18	2005	Paris	France	Richard Tieken
19	2006	Paris	France	Miranda Dietz
20	2007	Athens	Greece	Carolyn Amole
21	2008	Athens	Greece	Awara Mendy
22	2009	Brussels	Belgium	Leslie Dyke
23	2010	Brussels	Belgium	Annie Shoemaker
24	2011	Brussels	Belgium	Alison Schumer
25	2012	Brussels	Belgium	Rachel Wilson
26	2013	Madrid	Spain	Chandan Lodha
27	2014	Madrid	Spain	Eric Chung
28	2015	Madrid	Spain	Zach Fields
29	2016	Rome	Italy	Laura Lynn Liptrap-Sandoval
30	2017	Madrid	Spain	Gavin Sullivan
31	2018	Madrid	Spain	Caroline Tervo
32	2019	Madrid	Spain	Aren Rendell
33	2020	Madrid	Spain	Jessie Rodriguez
34	2021	Virtual	Virtual	Melody Wang & Nyla Brewster
35	2022	Virtual	Virtual	Nour Abou-Hussein
36	2023	Madrid	Spain	Lap Nguyen
37	2024	Palma	Spain	Logan Kelly
38	2025	Brussels	Belgium	Atticus Lee
39	2026	Madrid	Spain	Christopher Shin

== San Francisco history ==
Session	Year	President(s)
1	2001	John Marshall
2	2002	Adam Hornstine
3	2003	Katherine O'Gara and Julie Hackenbracht
4	2004	Stephanie Kendall and Michael Schacter
5	2005	Michael Thompson
6	2006	Shanshan Jiang and Katie Johnson
7	2007	Jordan Boslego and Loui Itoh
8	2008	Megan Srinivas and Jason Burke
9	2009	Meaghan Graul, Brittany Lin, and Sam Roosz
10	2010	Glenn Alterman, Laura Dean, and Ariel Stoddard
11	2011	Vasso Katsarou, Basima Tewfik, and Ethan Amaker
12	2012	Alison DiCurcio
13	2013	Annie Baldwin
14	2014	Andrew Sudler
15	2015	Samuel Finegold
16	2016	Peyton Fine
17	2017	Maddy Nam
18	2018	Andrew Badinelli
19	2019	Nicholas Eynon
20	2020	Nirav Sookhai
21	2021	Trisha Prabhu
22	2022	Michael Wallace
23	2023	Matt Tibbitts
24	2024	Nahla Owens
25	2025	Andre Ramsey
26	2026	Hiral Chavre
27	2027	Layla Kelly

== Middle East history ==
Session	Year	President
1	2013	Eric Cervini
2	2014	Amy Alemu
3	2015	Erica Byas-Smith
4	2016	Rebecca Curran
5	2017	Carlos Mendizabal
6	2018	Benjamin Delsman
7	2019	William Delaney
8	2020	Lainey Newman
9 (Conference cancelled due to COVID-19)	2021	Claira Janover
10	2022	Delaney Hurley
11	2023	Samuel D. Lowry
12	2024	Meredith Zielonka
13	2025	Nabila Chowdhury
14	2026	Salma Boukouj
15	2027	Yasmeen Galal

== Latin America history ==
Session	Year	Location		
Session	Year	City	Country	President
1	2014	São Paulo	Brazil	Enzo Vasquez
2	2015	São Paulo	Brazil	Oksana Moscoso
3	2016	São Paulo	Brazil	Rebecca Ramos
4	2017	São Paulo	Brazil	Andrew Wilcox
5	2018	Mexico City	Mexico	Jocelyn Hernandez

== Logistics ==
Each year, around 200 Harvard undergraduates assist with planning and running the conferences.

For the Boston conference, the debate topic must be chosen by May. Updates to briefings are written and distributed to schools by winter, and issue summaries are also provided to the delegates. HMC 2009 was HMC's first-ever paperless conference. For the duration of the event, each year, Harvard Model Congress uses most of the Boston Sheraton conference space.
