= Black Alliance for Educational Options =

Coordinates: 38.9001°N 77.0370°W

Black Alliance for Educational Options (BAEO) was a nonprofit group supporting school voucher and charter school programs in the United States. It was one of the largest pro-voucher groups. The group's mission was to "actively support parental choice to empower families and to increase quality educational options for Black children".

Black Alliance for Educational Options' chairman in 2002, Howard Fuller, was a former schools superintendent in Milwaukee where the first voucher program in the U.S. was established. Gerard Robinson was the group's president until his appointment as Education Secretary for the state of Virginia. Harrison Blackmond became president of the group's Detroit chapter.

In 2013, the group opposed a Federal lawsuit seeking to block a voucher program in Louisiana. The group was also critical of the defunding of the D.C. Opportunity Scholarship Program. The group supports performance pay for teachers.

The group's board of directors has included:

- Dwight E. Evans
- Kevin P. Chavous

Funding support has come from the Bradley Foundation.

In October 2017, it was announced that BAEO was shutting down and on December 31, 2017, BAEO stated on their Facebook page, "Today is the last day for us."
