= Lee Raymond =

American businessman (1938–2026)

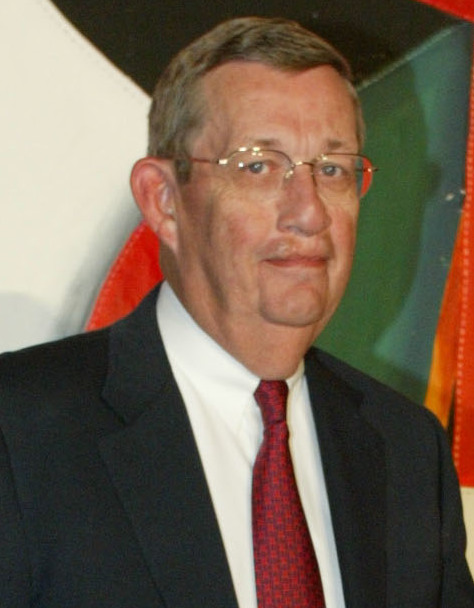

19th President of Exxon
- In office January 1, 1987 – April 28, 1993
- Preceded by: Lawrence G. Rawl
- Succeeded by: Charles R. Sitter

21st President of ExxonMobil
- In office February 1, 1996 – March 1, 2004
- Preceded by: Charles R. Sitter
- Succeeded by: Rex Tillerson

14th Chairman of ExxonMobil
- In office April 28, 1993 – December 31, 2005
- Preceded by: Lawrence G. Rawl
- Succeeded by: Rex Tillerson

Personal details
- Born: August 13, 1938 Watertown, South Dakota, U.S.
- Died: June 6, 2026 (aged 87) Dallas, Texas, U.S.
- Party: Republican
- Spouse: Charlene Hocevar (m. 1961)
- Children: 3
- Education: University of Wisconsin–Madison (BS); University of Minnesota (PhD)

Lee Roy Raymond (August 13, 1938 – June 6, 2026) was an American businessman who was the chief executive officer (CEO) and chairman of ExxonMobil from 1999 to 2005. He had previously been the CEO of Exxon from 1993. He joined the company in 1963 and served as president from 1987 and a director beginning in 1984.

While at Exxon, Raymond was one of the most outspoken executives in the United States against regulation to curtail global warming. While Exxon cast doubt on climate change in public, its internal research pointed to the role of human activity in climate change and the dangers of climate change which was characterized in the PBS Frontline three-part documentary The Power of Big Oil.

== Early life and education ==
Lee Raymond was born in Watertown, South Dakota, on August 13, 1938. He graduated from Watertown High School in 1956. Raymond received a bachelor's degree in chemical engineering from the University of Wisconsin–Madison in 1960. Raymond went on to earn his PhD in chemical engineering from the University of Minnesota. He was awarded an honorary doctorate from the same university in 2001. Raymond met his wife, Charlene (née Hocevar), while studying at the University of Wisconsin–Madison; she was pursuing and later earned a degree in journalism.

== Career ==
Raymond began working for Exxon in 1963. Raymond became a director of Exxon in 1984 and in 1987 he became the president of the company. In 1993, he became CEO succeeding Lawrence G. Rawl and held this post until 2005. He negotiated the merger with Mobil that became effective on January 1, 2000, and gave birth to the new ExxonMobil company. In 2003, when approaching the age of 65, the mandatory retirement age for executives at ExxonMobil, the board of directors requested him to stay in his position two more years, in order to prepare his succession, after the post-merger reorganisation period. On August 14, 2005, Raymond announced that he would retire at the end of 2005 as ExxonMobil's chairman and CEO, two years later than the usual mandatory retirement age of 65 for the company executives. ExxonMobil president Rex W. Tillerson succeeded Raymond on 1 January 2006. On April 14, 2006, it was reported that Raymond's retirement package was worth about $400 million, the largest in history for a U.S. public company. However, the majority of that sum consisted of retirement-independent salary, bonuses, stock options, and restricted stock awards from his final year and prior years that, while high, are not unprecedented among major American CEOs. Retirement-specific payments in accordance with the standard pension plan provided to all ExxonMobil employees totaled around $100 million, calculated based on his over forty years of service and his salary upon retirement. Raymond was also chair of the National Petroleum Council (NPC), when it was asked to produce a report on the future of oil supply and demand.

He was one of the most outspoken executives in the United States against regulation to curtail global warming. In the 1990s, Raymond claimed that the scientific evidence for climate change was "inconclusive" and that "the case for global warming is far from air tight".

After retiring from Exxon, Raymond was hired in 2005 as lead independent director for JPMorgan Chase. In 2020, amid pressure to remove Raymond from the board due to his history on climate change, JPMorgan Chase removed Raymond as lead independent director of JPMorgan Chase's board.

== Legacy ==
Steve Coll describes Raymond as "notoriously skeptical about climate change and disliked government interference at any level". In a BBC documentary, Big Oil v the World, Professor Martin Hoffert, a former Exxon climate consultant, called Lee Raymond's report, "Climate Change: Don't Ignore the facts", "a load of baloney" and declared, "I would have to say that on an ethical basis, it is actually evil."

Raymond was at the helm of Exxon while it remained one of the last large companies to omit gay employees in its anti-discrimination policy. He was also at the helm during the takeover of Mobil, when the new Exxon-Mobil corporation rescinded Mobil's pre-existing anti-discrimination policy. HR policy was eventually updated in 2015 to include a prohibition on discrimination against gay employees, but from 1999 to 2014 the board annually rejected a resolution brought by shareholders to compel the company to implement a non-discrimination policy.

His son, John T. Raymond, is active in the oil and gas industry. John partnered with the Jim Flores and Paul Allen-backed Vulcan Capital in the buyout of Plains Resources.

== Death ==
Raymond died from complications of pneumonia in Dallas, on June 6, 2026, at the age of 87.

== Awards and honors ==
- 1998 Golden Plate Award of the American Academy of Achievement
- 2003 Woodrow Wilson Award for Corporate Citizenship from the Woodrow Wilson International Center for Scholars
- 2006 Texas Business Hall of Fame
- 2006 L. R. Raymond Awards scholarship fund endowed by Exxon Mobil in Raymond's honor
- 2018 Honorary Lifetime Achievement Award for the Advancement of International Energy Policy & Diplomacy from the Abdullah Bin Hamad Al-Attiyah International Foundation for Energy & Sustainable Development

== See also ==
- The Power of Big Oil

Business positions
Preceded by position created	CEO of ExxonMobil; November 30, 1999–December 31, 2005	Succeeded by Rex Tillerson
Preceded by Lawrence G. Rawl	CEO of Exxon; 1993–November 30, 1999	Succeeded by Continued as head of ExxonMobil
