= Lanhee Chen =

American academic, policy advisor, political scientist, and lawyer (born 1978)

- 陳仁宜
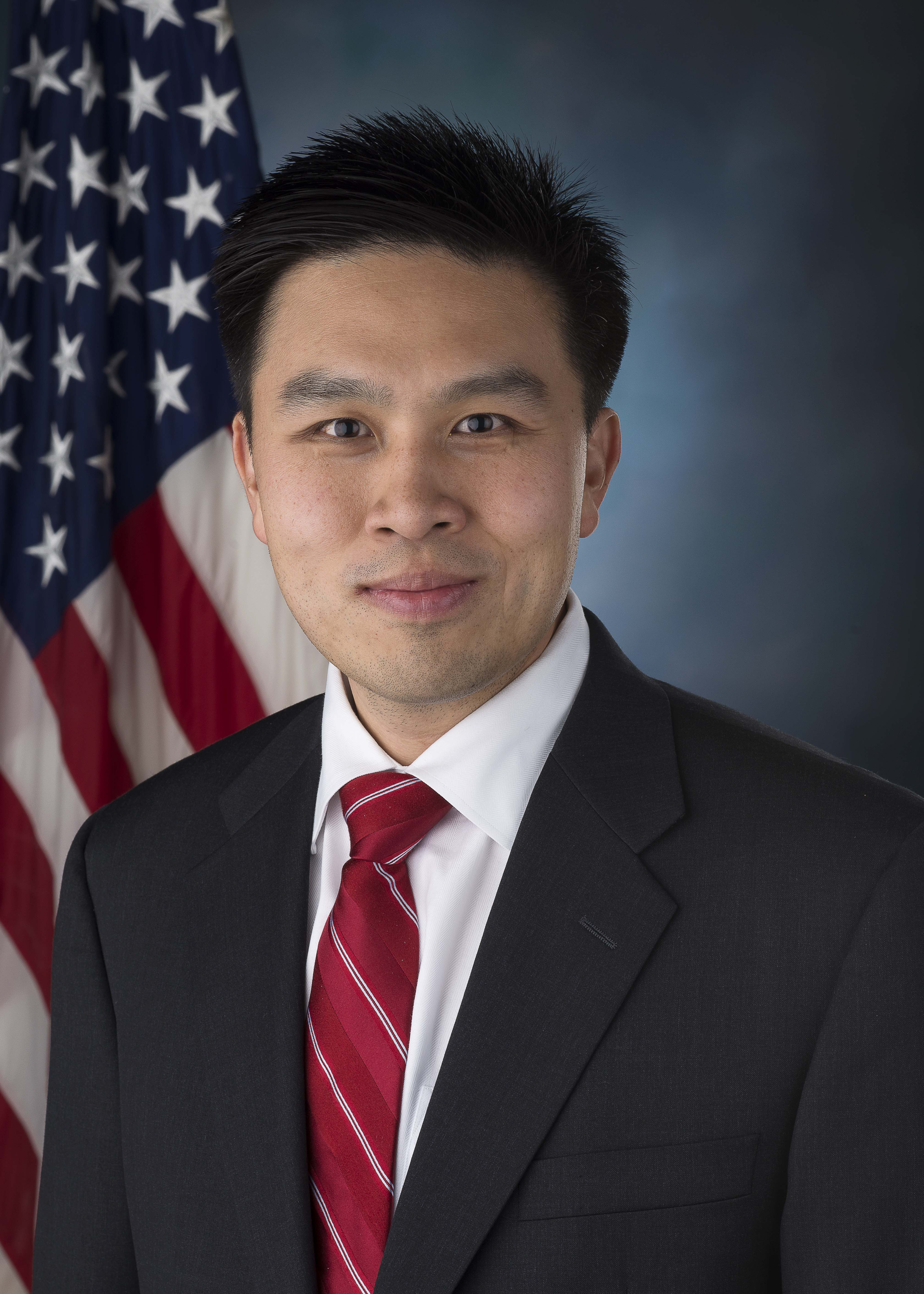
- Official portrait, 2014

Member of the Amtrak Board of Directors
- Incumbent
- Assumed office December 21, 2024
- Appointed by: Joe Biden

Member of the Social Security Advisory Board
- In office September 8, 2014 – September 2018
- Appointed by: Barack Obama

Personal details
- Born: Lanhee Joseph Chen; July 4, 1978 (age 48) Fayetteville, North Carolina, U.S.
- Party: Republican
- Education: Harvard University (BA, MA, JD, PhD)
- Website: Campaign website

Chinese name
- Traditional Chinese: 陳仁宜
- Simplified Chinese: 陈仁宜
Transcriptions
Standard Mandarin
- Hanyu Pinyin: Chén Rényí
- Bopomofo: ㄔㄣˊㄖㄣˊㄧˊ
Southern Min
- Hokkien POJ: Tân Jîn-gî

Lanhee Joseph Chen (/ˈlænhiː tʃɛn/; Chinese: 陳仁宜; pinyin: Chén Rényí; born July 4, 1978) is an American political scientist, lawyer, legal scholar, and academic who has served as a member of the Amtrak Board of Directors since December 2024. Chen is also the David and Diane Steffy Fellow in American Public Policy Studies and Co-Chair of the Health Care Policy Working Group at the Hoover Institution, director of domestic policy studies and a lecturer in public policy at Stanford University.

Born to a Taiwanese American family, Chen earned four degrees from Harvard University. He was the policy director for the 2012 Mitt Romney presidential campaign and Romney's Chief Policy Adviser. Chen has been described as the "orchestra leader" behind the Romney 2012 campaign. Romney confidante Beth Myers described Chen as the person Romney relied on "entirely" for policy direction. Chen was also a senior adviser to the 2016 presidential campaign of Senator Marco Rubio. He has twice been the senior policy adviser to the National Republican Senatorial Committee.

Chen has served in presidential administrations of both major parties. He was nominated by President Barack Obama and confirmed by the U.S. Senate to a seat on the bipartisan and independent Social Security Advisory Board, which advises the president, Congress, and the Social Security Administrator on Social Security policies. He was recommended for the post by Senate Republican Leader Mitch McConnell and served from 2014 to 2018.

Chen currently serves on the board of directors of El Camino Health, a major hospital in Silicon Valley. Chen was the Republican nominee for the 2022 California State Controller election. In September 2024, Chen was nominated by President Joe Biden to a seat on the Board of Directors of Amtrak. He was confirmed by the U.S. Senate on December 21, 2024.

== Early life and education ==
Chen was born in Fayetteville, North Carolina, to a Taiwanese American family. His parents were Taiwanese benshengren who had immigrated from Yunlin County, Taiwan, to the United States. At age seven, Chen moved with his family to Rowland Heights, California, where he was raised in a large Taiwanese community. In 2023, Chen recalled that "when I was young, I visited Taiwan every summer. I spoke Taiwanese at home, and we often ate Taiwanese food at home". He speaks Taiwanese Hokkien more fluently than Mandarin Chinese.

Chen attended John A. Rowland High School, where he founded a Junior State of America (JSA) chapter in 1992 and was the chapter's president through the 1993–1994 academic year. Chen was one of the top students in California and one of the top nationally in the International Extemporaneous speaking and Lincoln-Douglas debate. He was also one of the nation's top student senators in the 1994 National Speech and Debate Association John C. Stennis National Student Congress.

After high school, Chen entered Harvard University, where he graduated magna cum laude with a Bachelor of Arts (B.A.) in government from Harvard College in 1999 on a John Harvard Scholarship. From 2000 to 2009, he pursued graduate studies at Harvard in political science, during which time he simultaneously enrolled in Harvard Law School, where he was classmates with political commentator Sarah Isgur, and worked as a teaching fellow (2003–2005). Chen received his Master of Arts (M.A.) in political science from the university in 2004 and his Juris Doctor (J.D.), cum laude, in 2007. In 2009, Chen earned his Ph.D. from the Harvard Graduate School of Arts and Sciences in political science.

While at Harvard, Chen was active in multiple political and policy-oriented activities. He was a roommate of Tom Cotton, who later became a US Senator representing Arkansas, and businessman Bom Kim. In 1999, Chen served as a co-president of Harvard Model Congress. His Ph.D. dissertation, titled "Essays on Elections," examined electoral politics by analyzing judicial elections, presidential elections, and the impact of redistricting on electoral outcomes. His doctoral advisers included political scientists Sidney Verba and Gary King.

== Career ==
=== Political and policy work ===
After graduating with his first degree in 1999, Chen moved to Washington, D.C., to work at a public affairs firm.

Chen served in 2014 and again in 2018 as a senior adviser on policy to the National Republican Senatorial Committee. Prior to serving as Romney's chief campaign policy adviser, he joined Romney's Free and Strong America PAC in 2011 as policy director. Previously, he was deputy campaign manager and policy director on California Insurance Commissioner Steve Poizner's campaign for governor, Domestic Policy Director during Romney's 2008 campaign for president, and Senior Counselor to the Deputy Secretary of Health and Human Services. He was the healthcare adviser for the George W. Bush 2004 presidential campaign. He was also an Associate Attorney at the international law firm of Gibson, Dunn & Crutcher LLP. In 2003, Chen was the Winnie Neubauer Visiting Fellow in Health Policy Studies at The Heritage Foundation, an American conservative think tank based in Washington, D.C.

In 2015, Chen was named one of the POLITICO 50, a list of the top "thinkers, doers, and visionaries transforming American politics". He earned a similar honor in 2012, when he was named to a list of POLITICO's "50 Politicos to Watch." In 2012, Chen was called a "rising star" of the Republican Party.

==== California politics ====
Chen announced his candidacy for the California State Controller in July 2021, seeking to replace termed out controller Betty Yee. He lost to Malia Cohen in the 2022 California State Controller election.

In 2025, Chen opposed Proposition 50, or the legislative congressional redistricting map amendment, proposed by Governor Gavin Newsom is response to congressional redistricting in Texas. Chen described the proposal as "cynical" and argued that while the Texas gerrymander had precedent stemming from a 2003 Supreme Court case, Newsom's proposal "specifically contravenes California law and the expressed will of the state's voters".

==== Amtrak Board of Directors ====
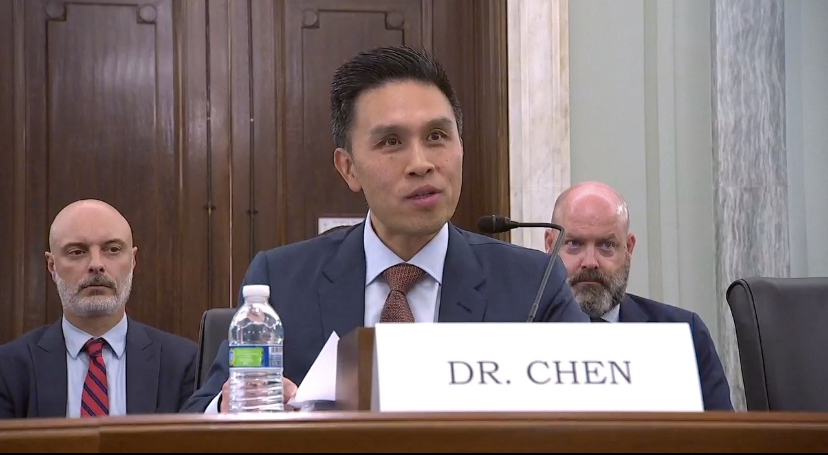
Chen during his confirmation hearing in September 2024.

On September 9, 2024, President Joe Biden announced he would appoint Chen to the Amtrak Board of Directors for a term of five years. Chen testified before the United States Senate Committee on Commerce, Science, and Transportation on 25 September. During his confirmation hearing, Chen said he would advocate for long-distance routes while at Amtrak. Chen also stated he would prioritize strategic planning and financial efficiency at Amtrak. He was confirmed by the Senate in a voice vote on 21 December.

=== Media ===
Chen was a CNN political commentator in 2016, and is believed to be the first Asian American to hold that position. He is often on television and radio, and frequently appears on a variety of networks, including ABC, CBS, NBC, CNN, MSNBC, FOX News, CNBC, FOX Business Network, Bloomberg TV and the BBC. He has appeared as a roundtable guest on ABC This Week, Face the Nation, Meet the Press, and Fox News Sunday and is a guest on top television political programming, including MSNBC's Morning Joe and MTP Daily, and CNN's State of the Union and The Lead with Jake Tapper. Chen is also a frequent guest on the Hugh Hewitt Show, a conservative talk radio program. He was also one of the lead commentators on Bloomberg TV's 2014 election night coverage with Mark Halperin and John Heilemann.

In the past, he hosted a podcast called "Crossing Lines with Lanhee Chen."

=== Academic ===
Chen holds multiple appointments at Stanford University. In addition to his roles at the Hoover Institution, School of Law, and Public Policy Program, he is also an affiliated faculty member of the Center on Democracy, Development and the Rule of Law in the Freeman-Spogli Institute for International Studies and on the Faculty Steering Committee of the Haas Center for Public Service. In 2017, Chen served as the William E. Simon Distinguished Visiting Professor at the School of Public Policy at Pepperdine University. From 2010 to 2011, he was a visiting scholar at the Institute for Governmental Studies at the University of California, Berkeley. During his time as a graduate student, Chen taught extensively as a teaching fellow and won the Harvard University Certificate for Distinction in Teaching eight times. He ran for a position on Harvard University’s Board of Overseers in May 2025.

=== Business ===
Chen was an Operating Partner and Strategic Advisor with NewRoad Capital Partners, a private equity fund focused on growth equity investing. He advised on the fund's health care investments.

=== Nonprofit work ===
Chen is a member of the board of trustees of the Junior Statesmen Foundation and is on the advisory board of the Partnership for the Future of Medicare and the Global Taiwan Institute.

He was named the inaugural director and currently serves as a senior adviser to the Aspen Economic Strategy Group, a project of the Aspen Institute co-chaired by Henry Paulson and Erskine Bowles, aimed at gathering, in a non-partisan spirit, a diverse range of distinguished leaders and thinkers to address significant structural challenges in the U.S. economy.

In 2015, Chen was selected as a member of the Committee of 100, a membership organization of Chinese Americans dedicated to the spirit of excellence and achievement in America.

== Policy positions ==
=== Healthcare ===
Chen has argued for repeal of President Obama's healthcare law. More recently, he has stated that changes to Obamacare can help reduce the deficit and that the law is problematic because it distorts the healthcare marketplace. He contributed to a conservative, market-based replacement for the Affordable Care Act, which was published by the American Enterprise Institute in 2015.

=== Taxes and domestic economic plan ===
Chen advised Romney on tax policy. Chen proposed in part a flat tax or "flatter" tax, and tax simplification.

Chen is a proponent of the "Feldstein cap"—the proposal by Harvard's Martin Feldstein to cap the tax reduction that each taxpayer could get from tax expenditures to 2 percent of his or her adjusted gross income. Chen also has said that Romney would "make permanent" the Bush tax cuts from 2001 and 2003.

Chen and Romney are advocates for so-called "paycheck protection" (laws barring unions from automatically deducting fees from paychecks for political activities).

Chen said that Romney would get "rid of Dodd-Frank" and replace it with regulation "that works". He said that Romney's plan would instead use more limited regulation with more "reasonable" regulation, including those that govern derivatives and "some kind of consumer protection".

=== East Asia ===
Chen criticized the Obama administration for its "pivot" to Asia, arguing that it lacked substance and was not pursued sufficiently robustly. He supports an expanded U.S. military presence in East Asia and an expansion of U.S. free trade agreements with Asian countries. He was a top adviser to the Romney campaign on policy, including U.S. policy toward China, and has been called "hawkish". Chen viewed China as a topic that distinguished Romney in the 2012 campaign.

=== Other foreign policy views ===
Chen accompanied Mitt Romney on his campaign swing through Britain, Israel, and Poland in August 2012 and was one of the advisers who approved Romney's criticism of President Obama in the wake of the attack on the embassy in Libya on September 11, 2012, and the resulting death of J. Christopher Stevens.

== Personal life ==
Chen has been described by the National Journal as a "prodigy." He has spent time in government, academia, and the private sector. He is a Protestant Christian. Chen is married, has two children, and lives in the San Francisco Bay Area.

== See also ==
- History of the Chinese Americans in Los Angeles
