= Belle Wheelan =

American educator

11th Virginia Secretary of Education
- In office January 14, 2002 – July 22, 2005
- Governor: Mark Warner
- Preceded by: Cheri Yecke
- Succeeded by: Peter A. Blake

3rd President of Northern Virginia Community College
- In office July 1998 – January 2002
- Preceded by: Richard J. Ernst
- Succeeded by: Robert G. Templin, Jr.

5th President of Central Virginia Community College
- In office January 1, 1992 – July 1998
- Preceded by: Johnnie E. Merritt
- Succeeded by: Darrel Staat

Personal details
- Born: Belle Louise Smith; October 10, 1951 (age 74) Chicago, Illinois, U.S.
- Spouse(s): Elliott Leslie Wheelan, Jr.
- Education: Trinity University; Louisiana State University; University of Texas at Austin
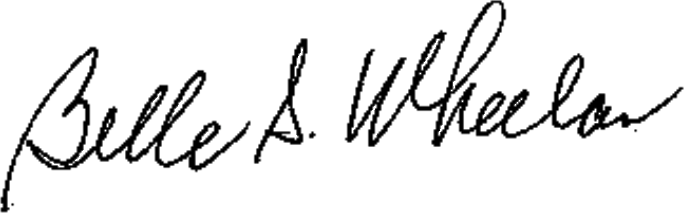
- Signature

Belle Smith Wheelan (born October 10, 1951) is an American educator who served as Virginia Secretary of Education under Governor Mark Warner. She is currently the President and Chief Executive Officer of the Southern Association of Colleges and Schools' Commission on Colleges.

Academic offices
Preceded by Johnnie E. Merritt	President of Central Virginia Community College; 1992–1998	Succeeded by Darrel Staat
Preceded by Richard J. Ernst	President of Northern Virginia Community College; 1998–2002	Succeeded by Robert G. Templin, Jr.
Political offices
Preceded by Cheri Yecke	Virginia Secretary of Education; 2002–2005	Succeeded by Peter A. Blake
