= Peter A. Blake =

American public administrator

Director of the State Council of Higher Education for Virginia
- In office April 1, 2011 (Note: Blake served in an interim capacity until January 10, 2012.) – January 1, 2024
- Governor: Bob McDonnell; Terry McAuliffe; Ralph Northam; Glenn Youngkin
- Preceded by: Daniel J. LaVista
- Succeeded by: Scott Fleming

12th Virginia Secretary of Education
- In office July 22, 2005 – January 14, 2006
- Governor: Mark Warner
- Preceded by: Belle Wheelan
- Succeeded by: Thomas R. Morris

Personal details
- Born: Peter Alan Blake; April 6, 1957 (age 68) Cincinnati, Ohio, U.S.
- Spouse: Mary Blanchard
- Education: Virginia Commonwealth University (BA, MS)

Peter Alan Blake (born April 6, 1957) is an American public administrator. Appointed Deputy Secretary of Education of Virginia by Governor Mark Warner in 2002, he was elevated to secretary upon Belle Wheelan's resignation in 2005. In 2012, he was appointed as Director of the State Council of Higher Education for Virginia after serving since April 2011 as interim director.

== Notes ==
Political offices
Preceded by Belle Wheelan	Virginia Secretary of Education; 2005–2006	Succeeded by Thomas R. Morris
