= State Council of Higher Education for Virginia =

Commonwealth's coordinating body for higher education

Agency overview
- Formed: 1956
- Type: State Council
- Jurisdiction: Virginia
- Headquarters: Richmond
- Motto: To promote the development of an educationally and economically sound, vigorous, progressive, and coordinated system of higher education in the Commonwealth of Virginia
- Agency executive: Director, Peter A. Blake
- Website: SCHEV Home Page

The State Council of Higher Education for Virginia (SCHEV) is the Commonwealth's coordinating body for higher education. SCHEV was established by the Governor and General Assembly in 1956. Its mission, which is outlined in the Code of Virginia (§23.1-200), is "to promote the development of an educationally and economically sound, vigorous, progressive, and coordinated system of higher education in the Commonwealth of Virginia."

== List of directors ==
- Belinda C. Anderson
- Peter A. Blake

== Location ==
SCHEV is located on the 9th floor of the James Monroe Building in downtown Richmond.
