= Lawrence G. Rawl =

American businessman

- Born: May 4, 1928; Lyndhurst, New Jersey
- Died: February 14, 2005 (aged 76); Fort Worth, Texas
- Education: University of Oklahoma (B.Eng 1952)
- Spouse: Betty E. Rawl
- Military career
- Allegiance: United States
- Branch: United States Marine Corps
- Service years: 1945–1947
- Rank: Sergeant

18th President of Exxon
- In office May 16, 1985 – January 1, 1987
- Preceded by: Howard C. Kauffmann
- Succeeded by: Lee R. Raymond

13th Chairman of Exxon
- In office January 1, 1987 – April 28, 1993
- Preceded by: Clifton C. Garvin
- Succeeded by: Lee R. Raymond

Lawrence Gabriel Rawl (May 4, 1928 – February 14, 2005) was an American businessman, the chairman and CEO of Exxon from 1985 to 1993.

== Early life ==
Rawl was born in Lyndhurst, New Jersey in 1928. Toward the end of World War II, he enlisted and served in the U.S. Marine Corps. In 1952, he graduated with a bachelor's degree in petroleum engineering from the University of Oklahoma, joining Humble Oil and Refining as drilling engineer.

== Career ==
By 1980, he was named a senior vice president and director of Exxon Corporation. In 1985, he was named president of the corporation; and in 1987, he became chairman and CEO, taking over from Clifton C. Garvin. During his tenure as head of Exxon, he moved the corporate headquarters from New York to Irving, Texas, increased reserves, and expanded the chemical operations of the corporation.

He was at the helm of the company when the Exxon Valdez oil spill occurred in 1989. He faced criticism for his response to the oil spill — his slow public response and his demeanor in interviews were noted and the focus of criticism of the company.

Rawl retired from Exxon in 1993 at the mandatory retirement age of 65 after 41 years with the company. He was succeeded by Lee Raymond as CEO of the company.

== Personal life ==
He died at age 76 on February 13, 2005, at his home in Fort Worth, Texas.

== Notes ==
Business positions
Preceded by Clifton C. Garvin	CEO of Exxon; 1985–1993	Succeeded by Lee Raymond
