= Thomas R. Morris =

American politician, educator (born 1944)

13th Virginia Secretary of Education
- In office January 14, 2006 – January 16, 2010
- Governor: Tim Kaine
- Preceded by: Peter A. Blake
- Succeeded by: Gerard Robinson

19th President of Emory & Henry College
- In office 1992–2006
- Preceded by: Charles Sydnor
- Succeeded by: Rosalind Reichard

Personal details
- Born: Thomas Robbins Morris; July 28, 1944 (age 82) Roanoke, Virginia, U.S.
- Education: Virginia Military Institute; University of Virginia

Thomas Robbins Morris (born July 28, 1944) is an American educator who served as Secretary of Education in the cabinet of Virginia Governor Tim Kaine from 2006 to 2010. Prior to his appointment, he served fourteen years as the President of Emory & Henry College in Emory, Virginia. He graduated from the Virginia Military Institute in 1966 with a degree in history and received a Master of Arts and Ph.D. in government from the University of Virginia.

Academic offices
Preceded by Charles Sydnor	President of Emory and Henry College; 1992–2006	Succeeded by Rosalind Reichard
Political offices
Preceded by Peter A. Blake	Virginia Secretary of Education; 2006–2010	Succeeded by Gerard Robinson
