= Eric J. Smith (educator) =

American academic administrator and educator

23rd Education Commissioner of Florida
- In office October 5, 2007 – June 10, 2011
- Governor: Charlie Crist; Rick Scott
- Preceded by: Jeanine Blomberg (acting)
- Succeeded by: Gerard Robinson

Personal details
- Party: Republican
- Education: Colorado State University; University of Central Florida; University of Florida
- Profession: Educator

Eric J. Smith is an American academic administrator. He served as the 23rd Education Commissioner of Florida from 2007 to 2010.

== Biography ==
He began his education career in Florida as a classroom teacher more than 30 years ago. After earning a Bachelor of Science degree in Physical Science and Education from Colorado State University, Commissioner Smith was eager to share his love of science with students of all ages. He accepted a position at Union Park Junior High School in Orange County, Florida, where he remained for seven years teaching mathematics and science, eventually serving as the science department chair. Commissioner Smith moved to Oak Ridge High School in 1979 to serve as Assistant Principal of Curriculum and Instruction and became principal of Winter Park High School in 1982. In 1986, he continued his career in Volusia County as a Regional Assistant Superintendent and in 1988 became the district's Chief Officer for Management Planning. He earned his master's degree from the University of Central Florida in 1978, and a Doctorate in Education in curriculum and instruction from the University of Florida in 1984.

He moved to Virginia, North Carolina and Maryland where he served as a district superintendent for the next 16 years, and eventually to the national stage with the College Board in 2006 as Senior Vice President for College Readiness. He was responsible for leading the EXCELerator project, funded by the Bill and Melinda Gates Foundation, which aims to prepare all students for college. The project is now implemented in five school districts across the country, including Duval and Hillsborough in Florida, inspiring nearly 45,000 students.

Central to his work, beginning at Winter Park High School in 1982, and continuing in each district thereafter, has been the expansion of Advanced Placement and International Baccalaureate programs.

Smith previously served as Chairman of the Board of Trustees for The College Board, and was a member on the Board of Directors for the Advancement Via Individual Determination (AVID) program. He has served as Chair of the National Assessment of Title 1 Independent Review Panel since 2003 and was named Florida's Commissioner of Education in 2007.

== Education ==
- Bachelor's from Colorado State University
- Master's from the University of Central Florida
- Doctorate from the University of Florida

Preceded by Jeanine Blomberg (acting)	Education Commissioner of Florida; October 5, 2007 – June 10, 2011	Succeeded by Gerard Robinson
