= Howard C. Kauffmann =

American oil executive

- Born: February 25, 1923; Tulsa, Oklahoma
- Died: May 3, 2016 (aged 93); Atlanta, Georgia
- Education: University of Oklahoma (BS 1943)
- Spouse: Suzanne McMurray (m. 1944)
- Military career
- Branch: United States Navy
- Service years: 1943–1946
- Rank: Lieutenant (j.g.)

17th President of Exxon
- In office August 1, 1975 – May 15, 1985
- Preceded by: Clifton C. Garvin
- Succeeded by: Lawrence G. Rawl

Howard C. Kauffmann Jr. (February 25, 1923 – May 3, 2016) was an American engineer and oilman. Kauffmann joined the Standard Oil Company of New Jersey (called Exxon after 1972) in 1946 and over the ensuing decades rose through the company's ranks. In 1975 he was appointed president and held the position until his retirement in 1985.

== Biography ==
Kauffmann was born on February 25, 1923, in Tulsa, Oklahoma. In 1943, he graduated from the University of Oklahoma with a bachelor's degree in mechanical engineering. After serving as an engineering officer in the U.S. Navy during World War II, Kauffmann commenced his nearly 40-year career in the petroleum industry.

In 1946, Kauffmann joined the Carter Oil Company, an affiliate of Standard Oil Company of New Jersey. Over the next three decades at Exxon, he progressed through roles spanning engineering, oil field supervisory positions, and assignments overseas. His key positions included Producing Coordinator at International Petroleum Company Limited and executive roles at Exxon's South American and European affiliates.

In 1974, Kauffmann was elected to Exxon's board of directors and named a Senior Vice President. The following year, he was appointed President of Exxon, succeeding Howard Page. He took office during a period of significant industry changes and public animosity towards major oil companies in the wake of the 1973 oil crisis. Kauffmann sought to diversify Exxon's business interests into new areas like nuclear power, solar energy and batteries. However, these initiatives failed to offset declining production prospects in oil and proved to be unsuccessful. By the mid-1980s Exxon had largely divested them to refocus efforts on petroleum.

Kauffmann retired from Exxon in 1985 after ten years as President. His tenure was characterized as competent stewardship during a difficult transitional period for the oil industry.

After retiring from Exxon, Kauffmann served on the Boards of Directors for several major corporations like Chase Manhattan Bank, United Technologies and Pfizer. He also held leadership roles in industry organizations and non-profits. Additionally, he co-ran a custom cabinetry business for several years.

Kauffmann died on May 3, 2016, at his home in Atlanta, Georgia at the age of 93. He was survived by his wife, four children, seven grandchildren, and one great grandchild.
