= Laura Fornash =

American education official (born 1969)

15th Virginia Secretary of Education
- In office August 1, 2011 – November 2013
- Governor: Bob McDonnell
- Preceded by: Gerard Robinson
- Succeeded by: Javaid Siddiqi

Personal details
- Born: Laura Ann Worley; August 26, 1969 (age 57) Danville, Virginia, U.S.
- Spouse: Mark Novey
- Education: Virginia Tech (BS, MS)
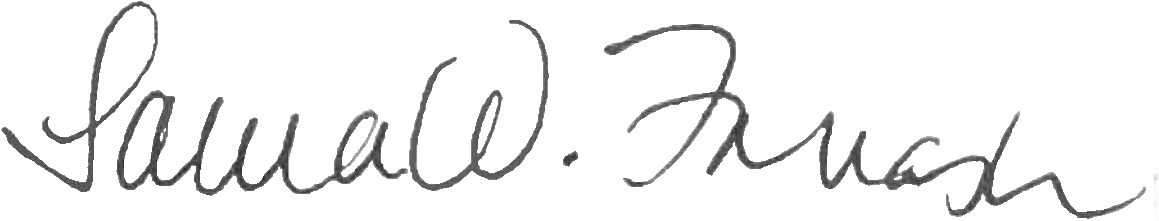
- Signature

Laura Worley Novey (born August 26, 1969) is an American education official and consultant. She served as Virginia Secretary of Education under Governor Bob McDonnell from 2011 to 2013. Prior to this, she served as Deputy Secretary of Education from 2010 to 2011, and was formerly the director of state government relations for Virginia Tech.

== Early life and education ==
Fornash is a native of Chesterfield County, Virginia. Fornash received her B.S. and M.S. degrees from Virginia Tech.

== Career ==
Prior to serving in the administration of Governor Bob McDonnell, Fornash worked as a lobbyist for Virginia Tech for over twenty years. She was appointed Deputy Secretary of Education in 2010 and was elevated to secretary upon the resignation of Gerard Robinson. She also served as executive director of the Commission on Higher Education Reform, Innovation and Investment.

She left in 2013 to take a position as a lobbyist on behalf the University of Virginia. She joined McGuireWoods Consulting as senior vice president and co-leader of the firm's National Education Practice.

Political offices
Preceded by Gerard Robinson	Virginia Secretary of Education; 2011–2013	Succeeded by Javaid Siddiqi
