= Cheri Yecke =

American politician

Florida Chancellor of Education
- In office October 3, 2005 – December 31, 2007
- Governor: Jeb Bush
- Succeeded by: Pamela Stewart

Minnesota Commissioner of Education
- In office January 2003 – May 17, 2004
- Governor: Tim Pawlenty
- Preceded by: Christine Jax
- Succeeded by: Alice Seagren

10th Virginia Secretary of Education
- In office December 4, 2001 – January 14, 2002
- Governor: Jim Gilmore
- Preceded by: Wilbert Bryant
- Succeeded by: Belle Wheelan

Personal details
- Born: Cheryl Ann Pierson; February 5, 1955 (age 71) St. Paul, Minnesota, U.S.
- Spouse: Dennis Yecke
- Education: University of Hawaii; University of Wisconsin-Madison; University of Virginia

Cheri Pierson Yecke (born February 5, 1955) is an author and retired conservative Republican professor in the United States.

== Biography ==
Yecke holds a bachelor's degree in history from the University of Hawaii, a master's of science degree in teaching from the University of Wisconsin-Madison, and a Ph.D. in educational psychology from the University of Virginia. Yecke served on the Virginia State Board of Education under Governor George Allen (1995–1998) and then was Virginia's Deputy Secretary of Education (1998–2001) and Secretary of Education (2001–2002) under Governor Jim Gilmore. She also served as the Director of Teacher Quality and Public School Choice at the U.S. Department of Education for the Bush administration (2002–2003), during which time she was detailed to the White House as a senior advisor for USA Freedom Corps. Yecke then became the Commissioner of Education for the State of Minnesota for Governor Tim Pawlenty (2003–2004).

As Minnesota's education commissioner, Yecke drew criticism in what was a tumultuous political battle between the newly elected governor and the DFL-controlled Senate. Yecke held her job from January 2003 to May 2004 before being forced out in a party-line vote. She then worked as a senior fellow at the Minnesota-based conservative think tank Center of the American Experiment for education and social policy, but has not been associated with the group since 2005.

Yecke ran as a Republican for Congress in Minnesota's Sixth Congressional District before being offered a job in Florida as Gov. Jeb Bush's Chancellor of K-12 Education, a position she took up on October 3, 2005.

Yecke had previously announced her run for the Florida state education commissioner's chair earlier in 2007, and had been among the list of three finalists being considered. However, it was announced on Oct. 8, 2007, that the position was given to Eric J. Smith, a senior vice president with the New York-based College Board. Having lost her bid for education commissioner, Florida's top public schools job, Yecke resigned as Florida's kindergarten-through-12th-grade chancellor in December 2007.

From 2008 to 2015, Yecke served as Dean of Graduate Programs for Harding University. Harding is a private liberal arts Christian university located in Searcy, Arkansas. She was considered a contender for president of the university after former President David Burks retired. She is now retired and lives in Searcy, Arkansas.

== Controversy ==
=== Intelligent design and Teach The Controversy ===
In July 2003 during her term as education commissioner, Yecke proposed that the Minnesota Science Standards include a technique favored by intelligent design proponents called Teach The Controversy in science curriculum. She cited the pro-intelligent design Santorum Amendment as supporting her effort. The versions of the Minnesota Science Standards circulated by Yecke contained language used by intelligent design advocates in the Teach The Controversy campaign which casts doubt on evolution while offering intelligent design as a competing theory. The version that was circulated among the public did not include these revisions. PZ Myers and other critics of intelligent design deemed the move an attempt to misinform the public in order to sway the committee decision in favor of intelligent design using public opinion.

In her campaign to be Florida's next education commissioner, Yecke has attempted to groom her reputation online. In June 2007, she disputed the accuracy of a 2003 newspaper article which reported her as saying that the Minnesota state education department policy supported schools deciding whether to include intelligent design in science curricula, and hired the Internet accuracy-watchdog service ReputationDefender as her advocate. Wesley R. Elsberry, marine biologist and critic of intelligent design whose blog The Austringer had referenced the article linking Yecke to the Teach The Controversy method of promoting intelligent design was contacted by ReputationDefender in June 2007. They requested that he remove a quote from Yecke on the issue of teaching creationism and intelligent design on the grounds that she disputes the quote in the original newspaper article. In considering the request Elsberry had asked for proof that the newspaper article did indeed quote Yecke inaccurately, going so far to contact the original reporter. Readers of the blog then provided links to archived recordings of Twin Cities Public Television broadcasts from 2003 showing Yecke saying that teaching intelligent design was a decision local school districts could undertake and teaching intelligent design is supported by the Santorum Amendment. Elsberry says her statements in these broadcasts are consistent with the quote Yecke disputed and tried to remove in the newspaper article. PZ Myers, who had commented extensively on Yecke's support of intelligent design in the past, described the recent effort by Yecke to distance herself from intelligent design as an attempt to "whitewash the past and silence her critics".

=== Allegations of nepotism ===
Both in Minnesota in 2003 and in Florida in 2005, allegations of nepotism were raised by state legislators and the press over Yecke's husband being placed in state jobs soon after Yecke had taken her positions. During her tenure as Minnesota's education commissioner in 2003, Yecke's husband was appointed as a deputy commissioner with the state's economic development agency by Republican Governor Tim Pawlenty during a hiring freeze.

Again, in 2005, this time as the K-12 education chancellor in Florida, Yecke's husband was hired as the deputy secretary of professional regulations by the Florida Department of Business and Professional Regulation (DBPR). This hiring later raised questions by politicians whether his qualifications did not significantly distinguish him from the rest of the qualified candidate pool available in Florida. However, the Florida Department of Education pointed out that "there was 'absolutely' no discussion of a job for her husband" and DBPR secretary Simone Marstiller said that "she was 'taken aback'" by the concerns, "calling his qualifications 'very impressive.'"

== Bibliography ==
- The War Against Excellence: The Rising Tide of Mediocrity in America's Middle Schools

296 pages. Praeger Publishers 2003.

- Mayhem in the Middle: How middle schools have failed America, and how to make them work

65 pages. Thomas B. Fordham Foundation 2005.

Political offices
Preceded by Wilbert Bryant	Virginia Secretary of Education; 2001–2002	Succeeded by Belle Wheelan
