= Gerard Robinson =

American education reformer (born 1966)

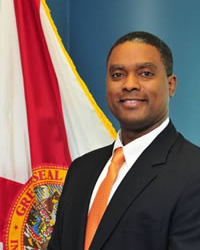

24th Education Commissioner of Florida
- In office June 21, 2011 – August 31, 2012
- Governor: Rick Scott
- Preceded by: Eric J. Smith
- Succeeded by: Tony Bennett

14th Virginia Secretary of Education
- In office January 16, 2010 – June 21, 2011
- Governor: Bob McDonnell
- Preceded by: Thomas R. Morris
- Succeeded by: Laura Fornash

Personal details
- Born: Gerard Robinson; September 24, 1966 (age 60) Lake Charles, Louisiana, U.S.
- Party: Republican
- Spouse: Kimberly
- Education: El Camino College (AA); Howard University (BA); Harvard University (MEd)
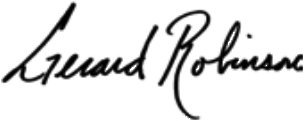
- Signature

Gerard Robinson (born September 24, 1966) is a former Virginia secretary of education and Florida education commissioner. He is a school choice proponent and former president of the Black Alliance for Educational Options. He was selected to be Virginia secretary of education for Governor-elect Bob McDonnell in 2010.

Robinson received an associate's degree from El Camino College, a bachelor's degree from Howard University and a master's degree in education from Harvard University.

Political offices
Preceded by Thomas R. Morris	Virginia Secretary of Education; 2010–2011	Succeeded by Laura Fornash
Preceded by Eric J. Smith	Education Commissioner of Florida; 2011–2012	Succeeded by Tony Bennett
