= Richard O. Mines Jr. =

American civil/environmental engineer

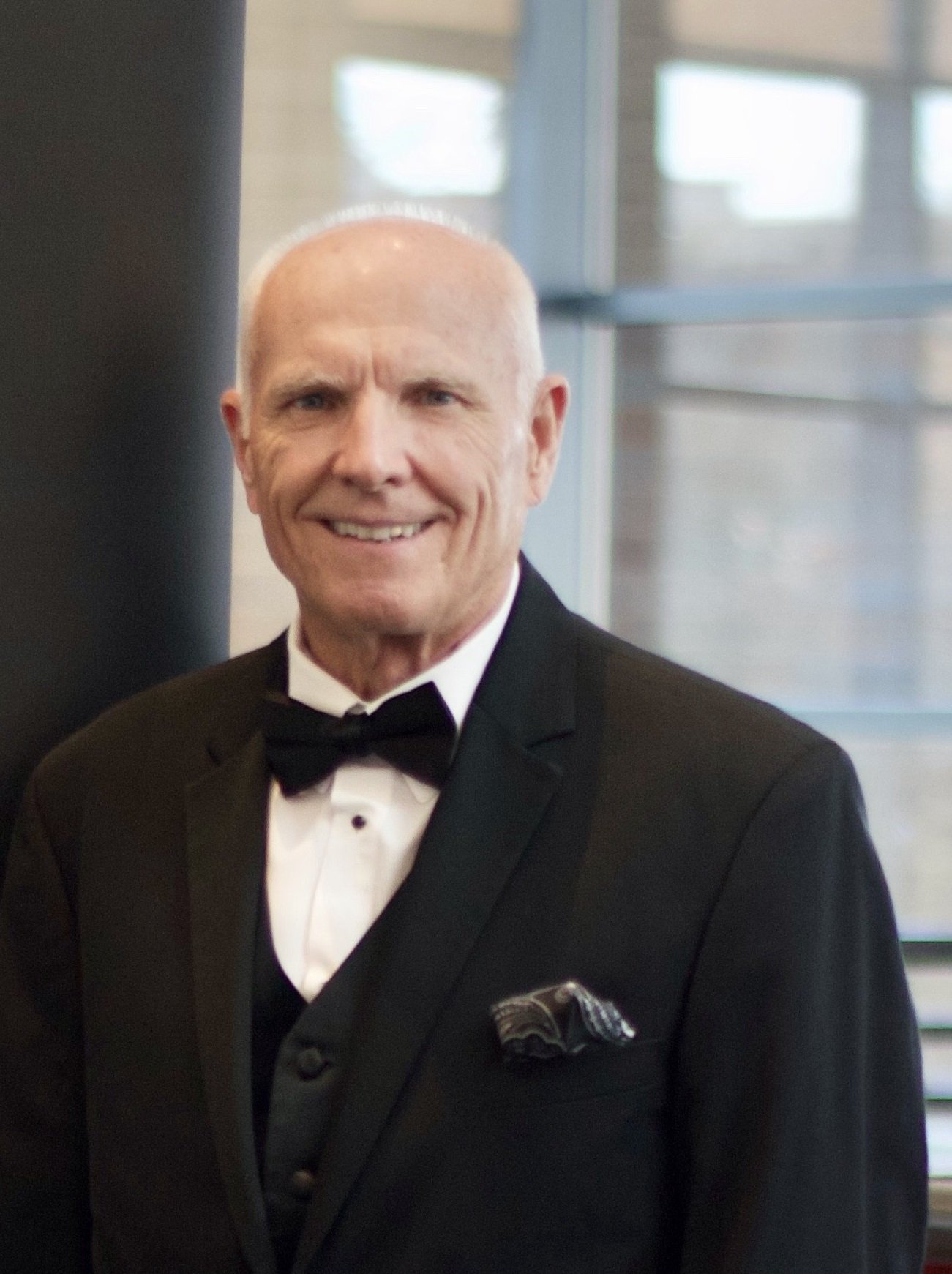
- Born: July 23, 1953 (age 73); Hot Springs, VA
- Occupations: Civil/environmental engineer, academic, and author

Academic background
- Education: B.S. in Civil Engineering; M.E. in Civil Engineering; Ph.D. in Civil Engineering
- Alma mater: Virginia Military Institute; University of Virginia; Virginia Polytechnic Institute and State University

Academic work
- Institutions: Mercer University; University of South Florida; Virginia Military Institute

Richard O. Mines Jr. is an American civil/environmental engineer, academic, and author. He is an emeritus professor of environmental and civil engineering at Mercer University. His research is primarily focused on the activated sludge process and biological nutrient removal processes, with particular emphasis on environmental engineering, water treatment, biosolids treatment, and engineering education.

Mines has authored/co-authored two books, entitled Introduction to Environmental Engineering, and Environmental Engineering: Principles and Practices. He is a Fellow of American Society for Engineering Education (ASEE), a Fellow of American Society of Civil Engineers (ASCE), and Environmental and Water Resources Institute (EWRI) and a Life Member of ASCE.

== Early life and education ==
Mines was born on July 23, 1953, in Hot Springs, Virginia, the eldest of three children born to Mr. and Mrs. Richard O. Mines. His father worked in the hotel management business (The Omni Homestead Resort and the Greenbrier) while his mother was a bank teller. He is a first-generation engineer as well as a first-generation college graduate.

Mines received his bachelor's degree in civil engineering from Virginia Military Institute in 1975. While studying there, he worked for HARZA engineering as a soils technician on the Bath County Pumped Storage Project. During this period, he was enrolled in the Flight Instruction Program (FIP) to earn his single-engine, land, private pilot's license. Upon graduation from Virginia Military Institute, he attended the University of Virginia, and obtained his master's degree in civil engineering in 1976. From 1980 until 1983, he studied at Virginia Polytechnic Institute and State University, and earned a doctoral degree in civil engineering.

== Career ==
Following his master's degree, Mines held appointment as a second lieutenant in U.S. Air Force stationed with the Virginia Air National Guard at Byrd Field in Richmond, Virginia. After his brief service in the Air Force, he began his academic career as an instructor at Virginia Military Institute in 1977. He served there as research assistant at VMI Research Laboratories until 1978, and as an instructor until 1979. In the following year, he joined Virginia Tech as graduate teaching assistant, and served in this position until 1983. He held his next appointment as an assistant professor at the University of South Florida until 1985, and subsequently rejoined Virginia Military Institute as an assistant professor for a year. From 1992 until 1998, he served as an assistant professor in the Department of Civil and Environmental Engineering at the University of South Florida. Following this appointment, he joined Mercer University as an associate professor and program director of environmental engineering and environmental systems in 1998 and was promoted to professor and program director of environmental engineering in 2005. He served there as director of MSE/MS programs and professor of environmental engineering from 2008 to 2017, and as professor of environmental and civil engineering department, and civil engineering startup coordinator from 2017 to 2022. Since 2017, he has been serving there as a civi engineering startup coordinator in school of engineering. In 2021, he held a brief appointment as chair and professor of environmental and civil engineering department, and then, in June 2022, he became emeritus professor of environmental and civil engineering at Mercer University.

Since 1995, Mines has served in several capacities in the ASEE Southeastern Section, such as vice chair of civil engineering division, chairman of civil engineering division, vice chair of instructional division, vice president of instructional unit, secretary of administrative unit, vice president of the administrative unit, president-elect, president, past- president, secretary administrative division, chair administrative division, Miriam-Wiley Award Committee, and chair awards and recognition. He has also been an active member of ASCE since 1975 and was made a Fellow in 2007 and achieved Life Member status in 2018.

== Research ==
Mines has authored more than one hundred publications. His research works span the field of wastewater treatment, with a particular focus on biological wastewater treatment, and engineering and environmental education.

=== Wastewater treatment ===
Mines has done significant research on biological wastewater treatment including activated sludge process, and biological nutrient removal processes (BNR). With a design team at Mercer University, he collaborated, and supervised the design of a residential anaerobic digester aimed at preventing food waste, and making energy as well. He has also modeled a BNR activated sludge system which indicated no significant difference between the predicted effluent values and the actual values, and analyzed the influence of temperature on the activated sludge process. In an in-depth review of wastewater collection system, he addressed all aspects of the collection system including wet weather control strategies, the design, and infrastructure modeling, odor control, and highlighted the innovation strategies as well. His research with colleagues evaluated the efficiency of ozonation for acid yellow 17 dye removal provided the evidence of its effectiveness. In the ozonation of synthetic dye wastewater, the efficiency of two empirical models to predict the parameters of color removal, and COD was evaluated. It was determined that ozonation is more effective in removing the acid yellow 17 dye than that of COD, and both the models can predict the process parameters, and ozone utilization. However, when the wastewater inlet properties are not homogenous, care must be taken to measure to removal efficiencies. According to his research focused on assessing the treatment of waste activated sludge with ozonation, and oxidation, it was reported that ozonation is more effective at removing the total solids (TS) and volatile solids (VS) than oxidation. As the contact time of ozonation increased, so did the biodegradability of wastewater. Having researched that, he developed a ten-liter semi-batch bubble column reactor in collaboration with a team of academics, and tested its operation by examining the ozonation of Waste Activated Sludge (WAS). Followed by that, he expanded his research on the design, and operation of a bench-scale ozonation wastewater treatment system by assessing the ozonation of raw industrial wastewater consisting of paper mill effluent and municipal wastewater from a water resource recovery facility (WRRF) in Georgia. After measuring numerous parameters, his research reported that the average COD removal for municipal wastewater was 82%, whereas for industrial wastewater, it was 84%. The average TSS removal was measured for both wastes, and it was noted to be 83%, and 81% respectively. While studying sludge, he has also focused his research on the sludge stabilization that examines the oxidation, and ozonation effectiveness in bench digestion studies. In a 2006 study, his research indicated ozonation to be more effective than oxidation in the 1-L bench-scale digestion study that reported the average removal rate of volatile suspended solids (VSS), and COD for both aerobic digestor, and ozonated digestor. Later on, using 2-L bench-scale digesters it was asserted that ozone is more efficient in removing total solids (TS) than that of oxidation.

Mines has also evaluated oxygen transfer in the activated sludge process. According to his research on oxygen transfer, the actual oxygen uptake rates (AOURs), and the calculated oxygen uptake rates (COURs) based on mass balances indicated a statistically significant difference for the bioreactors operated at low operated dissolved oxygen levels, and high dissolved oxygen levels. In addition to that, he has studied the influence of tank geometry on the oxygen mass transfer coefficient (K_{La}), and noticed that among the tanks’ shapes of cylindrical, inverted truncated cone, and rectangular reactors, the inverted cone reported the highest K_{La} values, whereas the rectangular reactor showed the lowest values of K_{La}.

Regarding BNR, Mines has investigated the potential of the Virginia Initiative Plant (VIP) in the removal of nitrogen and phosphorus from domestic wastewater as well. He has conducted research studies on the biological treatment of wastewater and nitrification at both high and low influent ammonia nitrogen concentrations.

=== Advances in education ===
Another line of Mines' research focuses on advances made in environmental sciences and engineering education. Most of his educational research has been featured in the American Society for Engineering Education conference proceedings. Based on the advanced principles, he developed a complete environmental engineering curriculum in 2000. He was also involved in the 2010 service-learning program of Mercer University which focused on the water availability, and quality in a Kenyan community. The research concluded that a biological sand filter (BSF) is an effective mode of water treatment, and given the limited resources, the project's impact on the undergraduate learning program was considered significant. According to his research on the "inverted classroom" pedagogy, students preferred a hybrid teaching model that features both traditional lecture-based method and inverted pedagogy as well. However, it was shown that the results of subject study were dependent on the students' maturity and their self-motivation to become life-long learners. Another research study, described how the students in an engineering design course indicated their preference of digital story telling of design such as unit operations, and processes of water treatment plant in place of a term paper.

Environmental Engineering: Principles and Practice was reviewed by academics, Alfons G. Buekens, and Luc Hens who wrote that "in summary, this textbook on Environmental Engineering: Principles and Practice can be recommended to all teachers with responsibility in environmental engineering. It focuses upon problem solving, introducing statistical analysis, examples with US and SI units, water and wastewater treatment design, sustainability, public health. It offers all major topics of an US environmental engineering curriculum with clear preference for wide-ranging knowledge on the one hand, water treatment on the other."

== Personal life ==
Mines is married to Beth Ellen Pehle, and has two children. They were members of Martha Bowman Memorial United Methodist Church for 26 years. They are currently members of the First Baptist Church of Christ in Macon, Georgia, and are members of the Pilgrims Sunday School Class.

Mines has completed 56 marathons in 25 states and run over 86,000 miles. He was inducted into the Bath County Athletic Hall of Fame in 2007.

== Awards and honors ==
- 2001 - Fellow, National Teaching Effectiveness Institute
- 2002 - Faith in Vocations Fellow, Baylor University
- 2002-03 - Outstanding Zone II Campus Representative Award, ASEE
- 2003-04 - Outstanding ASEE Campus Rep Award for Southeastern Section
- 2003-04 - Outstanding ASEE Zone II Campus Representative Award
- 2007 - Bath County High School (VA) Athletic Hall of Fame Inductee
- 2007 - Fellow, American Society of Civil Engineers
- 2008 - Evaluator of Tennessee Tech Master's Program in Civil & Environmental Engineering
- 2008 - Commons Fellow, Mercer University
- 2010 - Fellow, Mercer on Mission to Malawi, Africa
- 2011 - Tony Tilmans Section Service Award, ASEE Southeastern Section
- 2013 - Fellow, Environmental and Water Resources Institute
- 2015 - Fellow, American Society for Engineering Education
- 2018 - Life Member, American Society of Civil Engineers
- 2022 - Georgia Engineer of the Year, Georgia Society of Professional Engineers

== Bibliography ==
=== Books ===
- Introduction to Environmental Engineering (2009) ISBN 9780495295839
- Environmental Engineering: Principles and Practice (2014) ISBN 9781118801451

=== Selected articles ===
- Chandra, S., Mines, R. O., & Sherrard, J. H. (1987). Evaluation of oxygen uptake rate as an activated sludge process control parameter. Journal (Water Pollution Control Federation), 1009–1016.
- Mines Jr, Richard O. (1996). Assessment of AWT Systems in Tampa Bay Area, Journal of Environmental Engineering, 122(7), 605–611.
- Mines Jr, R. O., Vilagos, J. L., Echelberger Jr, W. F., & Murphy, R. J. (2001). Conventional and AWT mixed-liquor settling characteristics. Journal of Environmental Engineering, 127(3), 249–258.
- Lackey, L. W., Mines Jr, R. O., & McCreanor, P. T. (2006). Ozonation of acid yellow 17 dye in a semi-batch bubble column. Journal of Hazardous Materials, 138(2), 357–362.
- Mines, R. O., Lackey, L. W., & Behrend, G. H. (2007). The impact of rainfall on flows and loadings at Georgia's wastewater treatment plants. Water, air, and soil pollution, 179(1), 135–157.
- Mines Jr, R. O., Northenor, C. B., & Murchison, M. (2008). Oxidation and ozonation of waste activated sludge. Journal of Environmental Science and Health, Part A, 43(6), 610–618.
- Mines Jr, Richard O. (2019). Oxygen Transfer Parameters and Oxygen Uptake Rates Revisited, Journal of Environmental Science and Health, Part A, 55(4), 345–353.
