= Lisa Mahar =

American photographer and architect

- Born: 1965 (age 60–61); Florida, U.S.
- Education: Virginia Tech
- Occupations: Photographer, architect, designer, author
- Known for: Grain Elevators (1993), American Signs (2002), Kid O toys
- Awards: AIA International Architecture Book Award (1993); National Endowment for the Arts Design Arts Award (1992)
- Website: lisamahar.com

Lisa Mahar (born 1965), also published as Lisa Mahar-Keplinger, is an American photographer, architect, designer and author. She is the author of Grain Elevators (1993), a typological study of North American grain elevators that received the American Institute of Architects International Architecture Book Award, and American Signs: Form and Meaning on Route 66 (2002), a study of roadside signage. She is also the founder of the children's toy company Kid O, whose Magnatab was included in the Museum of Modern Art exhibition The Value of Good Design in 2019.

== Early life and education ==
Mahar was born in Florida in 1965 and moved to Brazil at the age of six; she later spent her teenage years in Northern Virginia. She studied architecture at Virginia Tech, where the program's Bauhaus-influenced curriculum combined architecture with photography, printmaking and ceramics.

== Career ==
=== Architecture ===
After graduating, Mahar worked for Polshek and Partners (now Ennead Architects) on the restoration and expansion of Carnegie Hall, and subsequently for the Italian architect Aldo Rossi, for whom she designed two monographs. She later practiced as a principal of Mahar, Adjmi and Partners in New York until 2003.

=== Grain Elevators (1993) ===
Mahar's first book, Grain Elevators (Princeton Architectural Press, 1993), published under the name Lisa Mahar-Keplinger with an introduction by Aldo Rossi, is a typological study of North American grain elevators combining her black-and-white photographs with analytical drawings. It received the American Institute of Architects International Architecture Book Award in 1993.

The book was reviewed in the Journal of Architectural Education, IA: The Journal of the Society for Industrial Archeology and Great Plains Research. Reviewing it alongside Jakle and Sculle's The Gas Station in America in the Journal of Architectural Education, David W. Clarke placed both books within the growth of scholarly interest in vernacular architecture, noting that the two treat their subjects "with distinctively different analytical styles" while sharing a motivation in "the iconic nature of the object". In Great Plains Research, Robert Duncan praised the book's diagrammatic drawings for showing how the elevators function as both "structure and monument". The book's typology of elevator forms has since been used as a classification framework in historic-resource surveys, and it was the source for John H. Lienhard's Engines of Our Ingenuity episode on grain elevators.

=== American Signs (2002) ===
Her second book, American Signs: Form and Meaning on Route 66 (Monacelli Press, 2002), is a study of mid-twentieth-century commercial signage along U.S. Route 66, organized by decade and analyzed through photographs, diagrams and annotation.

Tom Vanderbilt reviewed the book at length in Print, situating it in the tradition of J. B. Jackson's writing on the American highway strip and noting the "anatomical bent" of Mahar's approach to signs that motorists ordinarily glimpse only briefly. The design critic Rick Poynor, founding editor of Eye, included it in his list of books every graphic designer should read, describing it as "a rare example of a book about graphic design ... where the investigation is conducted visually by means of photographs, diagrams, and annotation" and "a paradigm for future visually inventive design studies". In the journal Space and Culture, Andrew F. Wood drew on what he called Mahar's "extraordinary analysis of Route 66 imagery" in a study of American mom-and-pop motels.

Mahar also contributed an essay on Charles Demuth's painting of a grain elevator, My Egypt (1927), to the Whitney Museum's Frames of Reference: Looking at American Art, 1900–1950 (1999).

=== Kid O ===
In the 2000s Mahar founded Kid O, a children's toy company and retail store at 123 West 10th Street in Greenwich Village, Manhattan. Kid O's best-known product, the Magnatab, is a magnetic tablet for learning letterforms that Mahar developed drawing on Montessori methods. The Kid O product line was acquired by PlayMonster in 2018. Mahar is listed as an artist in the Museum of Modern Art's collection database in connection with the 2019 exhibition The Value of Good Design.

=== Photography ===
Mahar has worked as a photographer throughout her career. Her series photographing her family was the subject of an interview with Daylight Books. Her ongoing projects include Knotted String (2010–2015) and The Understory.

== Awards and recognition ==
- 1991 – New York State Council on the Arts grant
- 1992 – National Endowment for the Arts Design Arts Award
- 1993 – American Institute of Architects International Architecture Book Award, for Grain Elevators
- 2008 – Kid O named best toy store in New York by New York magazine
- 2018 – Kid O toys included in Design for Children (Phaidon)
- 2019 – Magnatab included in The Value of Good Design, Museum of Modern Art

== Personal life ==
Mahar has lived in New York City for nearly four decades and has also been based in New Orleans.

== Bibliography ==
- Grain Elevators. New York: Princeton Architectural Press, 1993. ISBN 978-1-878271-35-8 (as Lisa Mahar-Keplinger)
- American Signs: Form and Meaning on Route 66. New York: Monacelli Press, 2002. ISBN 978-1-58093-119-9
