= Beverly Sgro =

American educator (1941–2020)

8th Virginia Secretary of Education
- In office January 15, 1994 – January 17, 1998
- Governor: George Allen
- Preceded by: Karen J. Petersen
- Succeeded by: Wilbert Bryant

Personal details
- Born: Beverly Ann Huston; January 12, 1941 Fort Worth, Texas, U.S.
- Died: March 13, 2020 (aged 79) Asheville, North Carolina, U.S.
- Spouse: Joseph Anthony Sgro
- Education: Texas Woman's University; Virginia Tech

Beverly Huston Sgro (January 12, 1941 – March 13, 2020) was an American educator who served as Virginia Secretary of Education under Governor George Allen.
