= Tim Leaton =

American film director

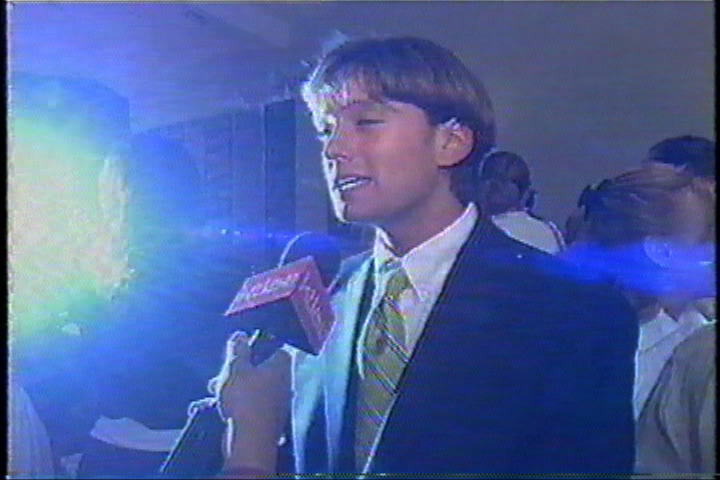
- Born: Edward Timothy Leaton; December 9, 1983 (age 42); Baltimore, Maryland, United States
- Education: Virginia Tech
- Years active: 2006–present

Tim Leaton (born December 9, 1983) is an assistant editor, editor, and filmmaker of several short films.

== Biography ==
He won significant critical attention in 2006 when he was awarded the grand prize of the 2006 Film Your Issue competition, judged by President Barack Obama, George Clooney and the Dalai Lama, among others. Leaton presented his winning film Orphans in Africa and gave acceptance speeches, covered by the press, at three awards ceremonies: at the United Nations Headquarters where he was introduced by the President of USA Today, then again in Hollywood where he was introduced by the Mayor of Los Angeles, and finally during Sundance in Park City with Kevin Bacon and Mandy Moore. Leaton also received the 2006 grand prize Walt Disney Pictures paid internship. His mentors included some of the top executives, and he began getting hands-on experience on various Disney films. Years later when Lindsey Brookbank of the Collegiate Times asked him what his favorite memory was from his grand-prize internship, he replied "Having dinner with Roy Disney on board the Queen Mary."

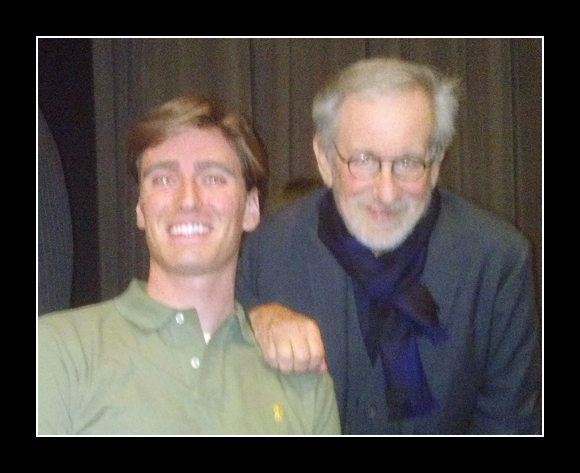
Tim Leaton and Steven Spielberg at a Motion Picture Editors Guild event - February 5th 2013, Los Angeles, CA.

According to Brookbank, this internship gave Leaton the connections and experience that would help him land jobs in Hollywood after finishing college. He returned to Film Your Issue as a member of the jury the following year, and has also judged other student film contests. Tim graduated from Virginia Tech in 2007 with the top academic honor of summa cum laude in each of his two separate degrees, and moved to Los Angeles on August 1, 2007.

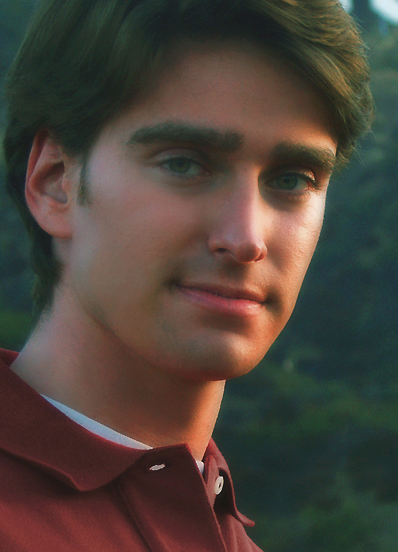
Tim Leaton, Age 26, October 3rd, 2010, Los Angeles, CA.

From 2007 to 2008 he worked with Ben Stiller at DreamWorks Pictures on the Academy Award-nominated film Tropic Thunder in the editing department, and received a letter of recommendation from Ben Stiller.

In 2009 he moved up to become an assistant editor, and has since assistant edited dozens of TV shows for various studios such as Warner Brothers, ABC, and NBC. His recent credits include the theatrical feature Apartment 1303 3D, and the #1 show of the summer, America's Got Talent. Leaton has been assistant editing America's Got Talent since 2012. In April 2014, the show set the Guinness World Record for World's Most Successful Reality TV Format.

Leaton has been featured in many media outlets, including the United Nations Chronicle, distributed to leaders around the world in various languages. In 2011, he was pictured in Life magazine.
