= Virginia Secretary of Education =

Secretary of Education of the Commonwealth of Virginia
- Seal of the Commonwealth of Virginia

- Flag of Virginia
- Incumbent; Jeffrey O. Smith since January 17, 2026
- Style: Mr. Secretary
- Member of: Virginia Governor's Cabinet
- Nominator: The governor
- Appointer: The governor with advice and consent from the Senate and House
- Inaugural holder: Earl J. Shiflet
- Formation: April 8, 1972
- Website: education.virginia.gov

The secretary of education is a member of the Virginia Governor's Cabinet. The office is currently held by Jeffrey O. Smith who serves under Governor Abigail Spanberger.

== Duties ==
The Secretary oversees all education in Virginia, and oversees the following agencies and institutions:

- Virginia Department of Education
- Virginia PTA
- Virginia Career Education Foundation
- The State Council for Higher Education in Virginia
- Virginia Early Childhood Foundation
- Virginia Community College System

== List of secretaries of education ==
#	Name	Start date	End date	Governor(s)
1	Earl J. Shiflet	1972	1974	Linwood Holton
Acting	Carter O. Lowance	1974	1976	Mills Godwin
2	Robert R. Ramsey	1976	1978	Mills Godwin
3	J. Wade Gilley	1978	1982	John N. Dalton
4	John T. Casteen III	1982	1985	Chuck Robb
5	Donald Finley	1985	1986	Chuck Robb
5	Donald Finley	1986	1990	Gerald Baliles
6	James W. Dyke, Jr.	1990	1993	Douglas Wilder
7	Karen J. Petersen	1993	January 1994	Douglas Wilder
8	Beverly Sgro	January 1994	January 1998	George Allen
9	Wilbert Bryant	January 1998	December 4, 2001	Jim Gilmore
10	Cheri Yecke	December 4, 2001	January 14, 2002	Jim Gilmore
11	Belle Wheelan	January 14, 2002	July 22, 2005	Mark Warner
12	Peter A. Blake	July 22, 2005	January 14, 2006	Mark Warner
13	Thomas R. Morris	January 14, 2006	January 16, 2010	Tim Kaine
14	Gerard Robinson	January 16, 2010	June 21, 2011	Bob McDonnell
15	Laura Fornash	August 1, 2011	November 2013	Bob McDonnell
16	Javaid Siddiqi	November 2013	January 11, 2014	Bob McDonnell
17	Anne Holton	January 11, 2014	July 25, 2016	Terry McAuliffe
18	Dietra Trent	July 26, 2016	January 13, 2018	Terry McAuliffe
19	Atif Qarni	January 13, 2018	November 24, 2021	Ralph Northam
20	Fran Bradford	November 24, 2021	January 15, 2022	Ralph Northam
21	Aimee Guidera	January 15, 2022	January 17, 2026	Glenn Youngkin
22	Jeffrey O. Smith	January 17, 2026	present	Abigail Spanberger
