= Belinda C. Anderson =

U.S. academic administrator

President of Virginia Union University
- In office 2003–2008
- Preceded by: Bernard W. Franklin
- Succeeded by: Claude G. Perkins

Personal details
- Born: Belinda Childress Anderson; June 21, 1954 (age 72) Roanoke, Virginia, U.S.
- Education: Radford University; Virginia Tech

Belinda Childress Anderson (born June 21, 1954) is an American academic administrator who served as the 11th president of the Virginia Union University from 2003 to 2008. She is its first female president. Anderson was later dean of the Norfolk State University college of liberal arts and a professor of history and interdisciplinary studies.

== Early life and education ==
Anderson was born June 21, 1954, in Roanoke, Virginia. She graduated from Germantown High School. She earned a B.S. in history and social science and a master's degree in history from Radford University. Anderson completed an Ed.D. in community college education from Virginia Tech. Her 1986 dissertation was titled, A descriptive analysis of differentiated patterns of decision-making in choice of educational major. Anderson's doctoral advisors were Don G. Creamer and Lawrence H. Cross.

== Career ==
Anderson was a social studies teacher in Portsmouth and Norfolk, Virginia. She worked as the director of academic advising services at Radford University. Anderson served as a dean and professor in the school of general and continuing education at Norfolk State University (NSU). She was later the associate director for student affairs and the senior academic affairs for the State Council of Higher Education for Virginia. In November 2002, Anderson, the vice president of academic affairs at Virginia Union University (VUU), and 15 other employees were laid off. In 2003, she returned to VUU as its interim president following the resignation of Bernard W. Franklin. She was inaugurated as the 11th president on April 15, 2005. She is the first female VUU president. Anderson served as president until 2008 when she was succeeded by Claude G. Perkins. In 2012, Anderson returned to NSU as its dean of the college of liberal arts. In 2018, she was a professor of history and interdisciplinary studies at NSU.
