= D.C. Opportunity Scholarship Program =

The D.C. Opportunity Scholarship Program provides scholarships to low-income children in Washington D.C. for tuition and other fees at participating private schools. The program was the first Federally funded school voucher program in the United States. It was first approved in 2003 and allowed to expire for the first time in 2009 under the Obama administration. The program was reauthorized under the SOAR Act in 2011, but again defunded at the end of the second Obama presidency. The program was reinstated under President Trump.

== Background ==
In 2004, President George W. Bush signed the D.C. School Choice Incentive Act of 2003, creating the D.C. Opportunity Scholarship Program to provide scholarships to students from low-income families to attend a private school of choice. The program targeted 2,000 children from low-income families in Washington D.C. These children were given funding to help offset the cost of private schooling. In 2008, the program funded attendance at 54 D.C. private schools for students from families with an average income of $22,736, "or about 107 percent of the federal poverty level for a family of four."

In 2009 the program faced a phase out with President Barack Obama's 2009 budget proposal cutting all funding for the program and including language to prohibit any new students from receiving scholarships.

In 2011, Speaker of the House John Boehner and Senator Joe Lieberman introduced the Scholarships for Opportunity and Results (SOAR) Act to restore funding for the program and again allow new students to participate. The entirety of the SOAR Act was included in the 2011 long-term continuing resolution, the passage of which resulted in a five-year reauthorization of the D.C. Opportunity Scholarship Program. The 2004 legislation had permitted students to receive scholarships of up to $7,500, whereas the 2011 bill provides scholarships of up to $8,000 for students in kindergarten through eighth grade and up to $12,000 for students in grades 9-12.

In February 2012, President Barack Obama announced his budget proposal for 2013, which did not include new funding for the program. According to ABC News, the budget stated that the program's budget for 2012 had enough money to also cover students' vouchers in 2013, but did not mention future years. The lack of funding was criticized by conservatives, including The Heritage Foundation and The Wall Street Journal columnist Jason L. Riley, who argued that the program costs less per child and has a higher graduation rate than public schools in Washington D.C.

== Program Administrator ==
Between 2004 and 2010, the Washington Scholarship Fund, a nonprofit group, administered the program, which was funded at $12 million a year.

From 2010-2015, the D.C. Children and Youth Investment Trust Corporation served as the administrator of the D.C. Opportunity Scholarship Program. The program was appropriated to receive $20 million per year, beginning in the 2012-13 school year.

Beginning in 2015, the program is being administered by Serving Our Children DC https://servingourchildrendc.org

== Support and success ==
The program has received support from a number of prominent D.C. politicians, including former mayor Anthony A. Williams, former D.C. Council member Kevin P. Chavous and former D.C. Board of Education president Peggy Cooper Cafritz. It was opposed by Mayor Vincent C. Gray.

In 2010, a randomized controlled trial conducted under the auspices of the Department of Education examined the impacts of the OSP students. While the study reported that there "is no conclusive evidence that the OSP affected student achievement," the program was found to have a significant impact on graduation rates. Students who were offered vouchers had a graduation rate of 82%, while those who actually used their vouchers had a graduation rate of 91%. By comparison, the rate for students who did not receive vouchers was only 70%. The study received the Department of Education's highest rating for scientific rigor. Over 90% of the study's participants were African American, and most of the remainder were Latino American.

Further research found that students who received vouchers were 25% more likely to enroll in college than students with similar demographic characteristics who did not receive vouchers.
