= Aimee Guidera =

American public official (born 1967)

Aimee Rogstad Guidera
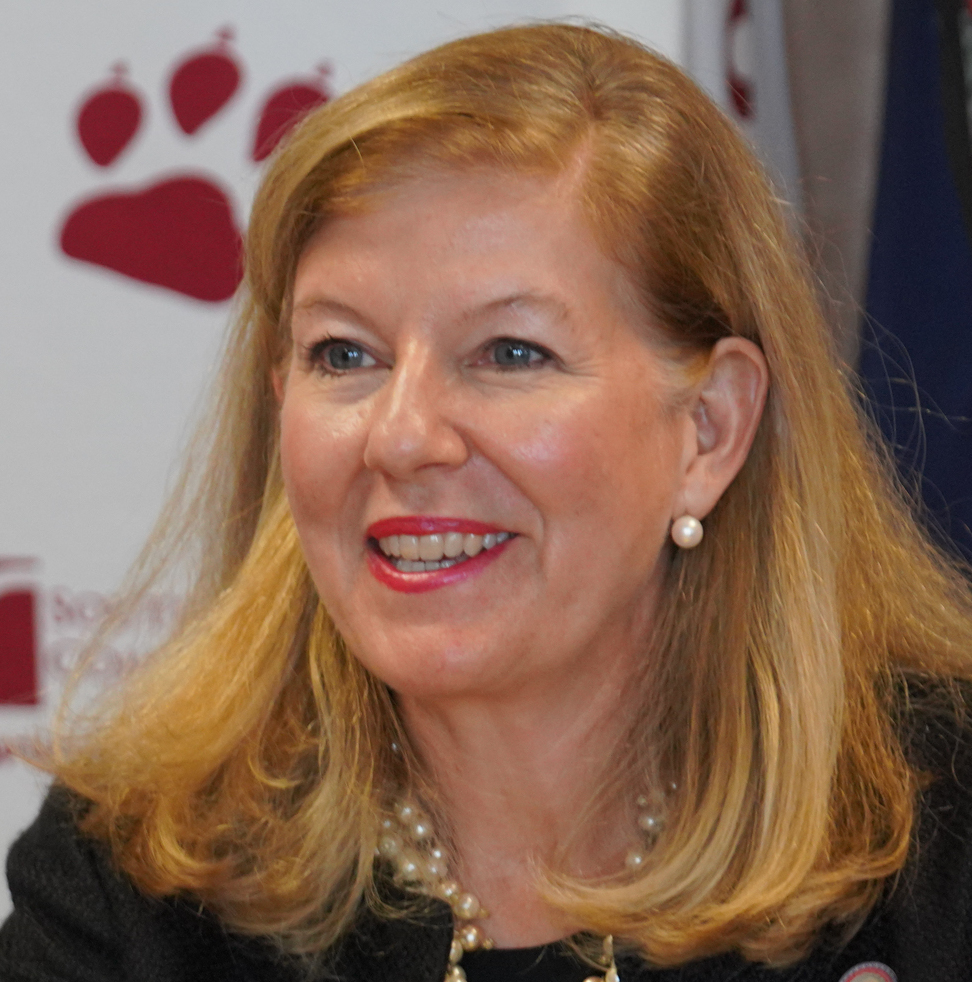
- Guidera in 2022

21st Virginia Secretary of Education
- In office January 15, 2022 – January 17, 2026
- Governor: Glenn Youngkin
- Preceded by: Fran Bradford
- Succeeded by: Jeffrey O. Smith

Personal details
- Born: Aimee Rogstad; 1967 (age 58–59) Maryland, U.S.
- Party: Republican
- Education: Princeton University; Harvard University

Aimee Rogstad Guidera (born 1967) is an American education professional and public official who served as Virginia Secretary of Education from 2022 to 2026.

== Early life and education ==
Born and raised in Maryland, Guidera received her Bachelor of Arts degree from the Woodrow Wilson School of Public and International Affairs, and later earned a master's degree in public policy from the John F. Kennedy School of Government.

== Career ==
After attending university, Guidera taught for the Japanese Ministry of Education and later worked for the National Governors Association on education policy and academic standards. From 1995 to 2003, Guidera worked for the National Alliance of Business, eventually becoming the organization's Vice President of Programs. From 2003 to 2005, Guidera was the director of the Washington, D.C. office of the National Center for Educational Accountability. In 2005, Guidera founded the Data Quality Campaign (DQC), a nonpartisan, nonprofit advocacy organization established to improve the quality, accessibility and use of data in education to improve student achievement.

Guidera has served on various boards of organizations including the Institute for Educational Leadership, Policy Innovators in Education Network, Conservative Leaders for Education, and the Harvard Center for Education Policy Research.

=== Virginia Secretary of Education ===
In 2022, Virginia Governor Glenn Youngkin made his first cabinet selection when he appointed Guidera as the Virginia Secretary of Education. Several news outlets noted that Youngkin's focus on education as a campaign priority was reflected in his decision to begin announcing his cabinet nominees with his choice for Guidera as Secretary of Education.

== Personal life ==
Guidera and her husband Bill raised two daughters in Minnesota and recently moved to Virginia.

== Honors and awards ==
In 2012, Guidera was named one of Time Magazine's School of Thought: 12 Education Activists of 2012.
