= Clifton C. Garvin =

American engineer, army officer and oilman

Clifton Canter Garvin, Jr.
- Born: December 21, 1921; Portsmouth, Virginia
- Died: April 17, 2016 (aged 94); Easton, Maryland
- Education: Virginia Polytechnic Institute (BE 1943, ME 1947)
- Spouse: Thelma Elizabeth Volland (m. 1943)
- Military career
- Allegiance: United States
- Branch: United States Army
- Service years: 1943–1946
- Rank: Captain
- Unit: Army Corps of Engineers

16th President of Exxon
- In office November 1, 1972 – July 31, 1975
- Preceded by: Milo M. Brisco
- Succeeded by: Howard C. Kauffmann

12th Chairman of Exxon
- In office August 1, 1975 – December 31, 1986
- Preceded by: J. Kenneth Jamieson
- Succeeded by: Lawrence G. Rawl

Clifton Canter Garvin Jr. (December 22, 1921 – April 17, 2016) was an American engineer, army officer, and oilman. In 1947 Garvin joined Standard Oil of New Jersey (called Exxon after 1973) and retired from the company in 1986. From 1972 to 1975 he served as its president, and from 1975 to 1986 as its chairman.

== Biography ==
He was born in Portsmouth, Virginia and graduated from Virginia Polytechnic Institute in 1943 with a bachelor's degree in chemical engineering. After graduation, he served with the U.S. Army Corps of Engineers during World War II in the Pacific theater for three years. He returned to VPI after his military service and received a master's degree from VPI in 1947.

He started his career at Exxon Corporation as a process engineer in their refineries. He worked in the Baton Rouge Refinery and ran Exxon's chemical operations. Garvin's corporate background was in transport, refining and marketing as well as chemicals—areas of the business that were important to Exxon at a time when governments in the Middle East and Latin America were squeezing the profits out of petroleum production. He was marked as a comer at Exxon in the early 1960s. In 1965 he took over the company's chemical operations and helped turn them into the fastest-growing part of Exxon's business. He became president of Exxon in 1972 and was selected chairman and CEO in 1975 until his retirement in 1986.

In 1981, he was appointed to President Ronald Reagan's National Productivity Advisory Committee and later served on the President's Private Sector Survey on Cost Control. He served as Chairman of The Business Council in 1983 and 1984.

He served on the boards of directors of Georgia Pacific, Chevron, Citicorp, Citibank, Johnson and Johnson, J.C. Penney, PepsiCo, Inc, Sperry Corporation, and TRW Inc.

He served on the board of visitors of Virginia Tech from 1988 to 1996 and was rector from 1991 to 1996. In 1997, the Virginia Tech Board of Visitors selected Garvin as the recipient of the William H. Ruffner Medal, the university's highest honor, for his selfless dedication and years of service to the university. He had honorary degrees from New York University, Stevens Institute of Technology and Georgetown University. He earned the Eagle Scout rank in 1937. He was a member of the Augusta National Golf Club.
