= Women's Viewpoint =

Women's Viewpoint may refer to:

- Woman's Viewpoint (magazine), an American woman's journal published between 1923–1927
- Women's Viewpoint (TV programme), a 1951 British discussion television programme
