= Woman's Viewpoint =

Woman's Viewpoint may refer to:

- Woman's Viewpoint (magazine), woman's journal published between 1923-1927
- Women's Viewpoint (TV show), a British TV show
