= Enco =

Enco may refer to:

- Enco River in Chile
- Enco (brand), a secondary brand used by Humble Oil (now part of ExxonMobil) in certain parts of the United States from 1960 to 1973.
- Enco Manufacturing Company, acquired by MSC Industrial Direct.
