= Humble Oil Building =

Historic building in Houston, Texas, U.S.

- U.S. National Register of Historic Places
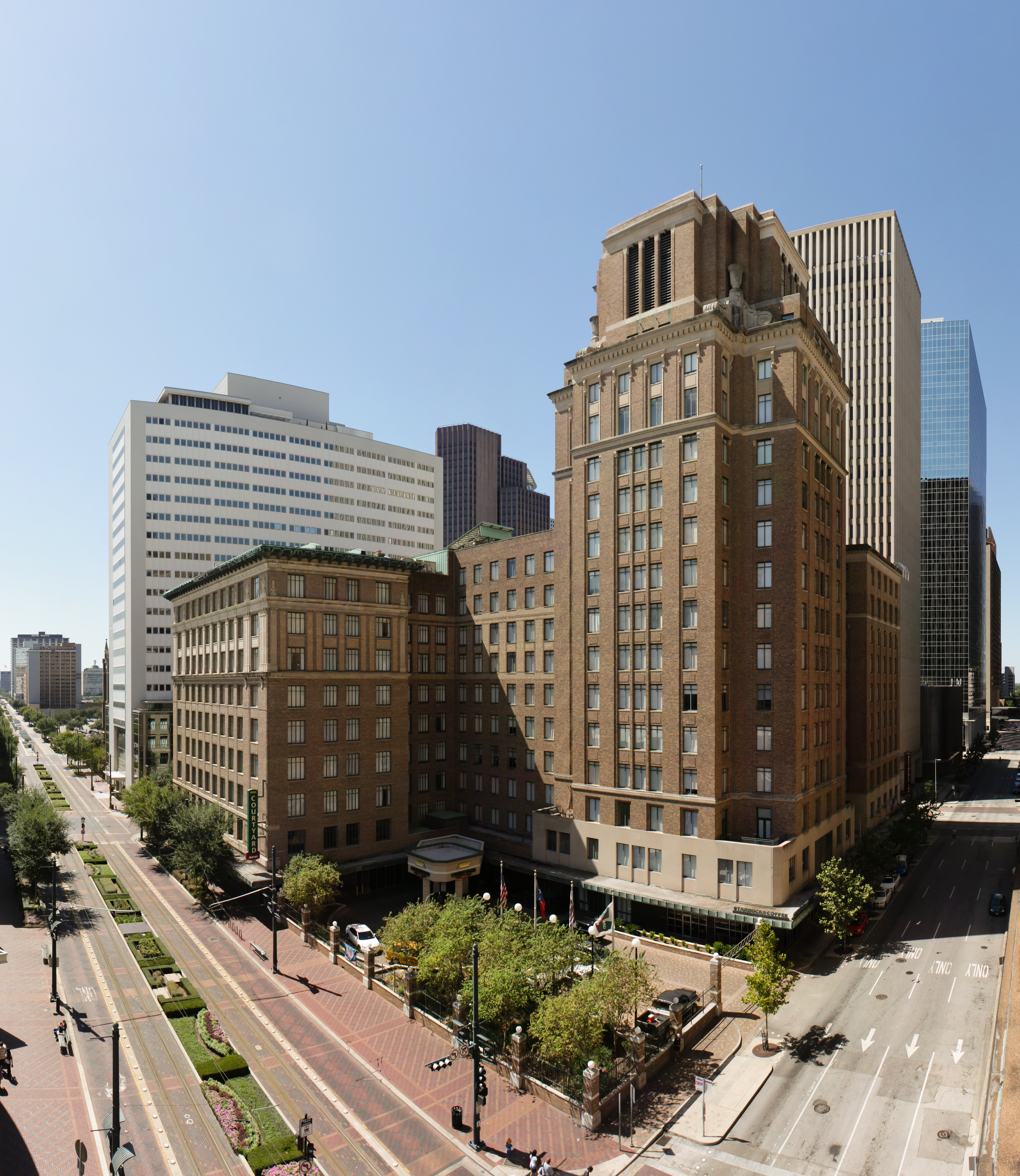
- The Humble Oil Building at the corner of Main Street and Dallas Street

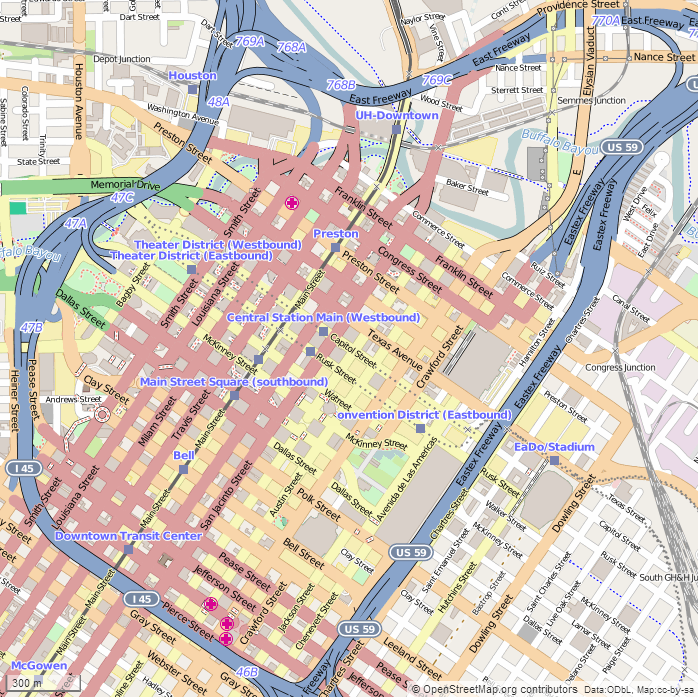
- Location within Houston Downtown Location within Texas Location within the United States
- Location: 1212 Main St., Houston, Texas
- Coordinates: 29°45′19″N 95°22′1″W
- Area: 2.5 acres (1.0 ha)
- Built: Original: 1921; Expansions: 1936, 1940, 1947
- Architect: Clinton and Russell, John F. Staub, Kenneth Franzheim
- Architectural style: Late 19th And 20th Century Revivals, 3-part vertical block
- NRHP reference No.: 99000068
- Added to NRHP: January 27, 1999

The Humble Oil Building, is a historic office building, designed in the Italian Renaissance architecture style, located at 1212 Main Street in Houston, Texas and listed on the National Register of Historic Places. It was constructed by Humble Oil and Refining Company in 1921. The tower section was added on to the building in 1936. The building complex served as the company headquarters for Humble Oil and Refining Company from 1921 until 1963, when the company moved into what is now the ExxonMobil Building at 800 Bell Street. In 2003, the building complex was renovated for use as a combination hotel and apartments, the apartment section was converted to additional hotel rooms in 2015.

== History ==
The original 9-story structure occupied half of a city block between Main Street and Travis Street, with the front facing Polk Street. This original structure was designed by prominent New York architects Clinton and Russell and cost approximately $1.2 million. It was the largest office building in Houston at the time, containing approximately 196,000 sq ft (18,200 m^{2}) of space. A 1932 renovation added a central air conditioning system to the building, the first in any Houston office building.

Humble Oil and Refining Company expanded the building in 1936 with an adjacent 17-story tower. This expansion was designed by John F. Staub and Kenneth Franzheim. Additional expansions were made in 1940 and 1947; and the complex now contains 529,809 sq ft (49,220.9 m^{2}).

In 1997, the building complex was purchased by Historic Restoration Inc., with plans to adapt the buildings into a mixed-use hotel, apartments, and retail space. The plans moved forward in 1999 with a loan from the City of Houston in the amount of $4.6 million in order to encourage the development. The plans were completed in 2003 and the building opened as a Courtyard by Marriott hotel, a Residence Inn hotel, and the Humble Tower apartments. It contained 360 hotel rooms, 82 'luxury' apartments, 6,721 sq ft (624.4 m^{2}) of street-level retail, and a parking garage. It was listed on the National Register of Historic Places in 1999, under the category "Late 19th and 20th Century Revivals". The apartment section was converted to a third Marriott-branded Hotel in 2015, a Spring Hill Suites.

== See also ==
- Architecture of Houston
