= Walter Fondren Sr. =

American businessman (1877–1939)

- Born: Walter William Fondren; June 6, 1877; Union City, Tennessee, US
- Died: January 5, 1939 (aged 61); San Antonio, Texas, US

Walter William Fondren Sr. (June 6, 1877 – January 5, 1939) was an American oil industry businessperson and philanthropist in Texas. He co-founded Humble Oil Company, an antecedent to ExxonMobil.

== Early life ==
Fondren was born on June 6, 1877, in Union City, Tennessee to two first cousins, Thomas and Susannah Fondren. His father died when he was a young child, and his mother moved the family to Arkansas. His mother died when he was ten years old, when he was already working on farms. He moved to Texas six years later.

== Career and philanthropy ==
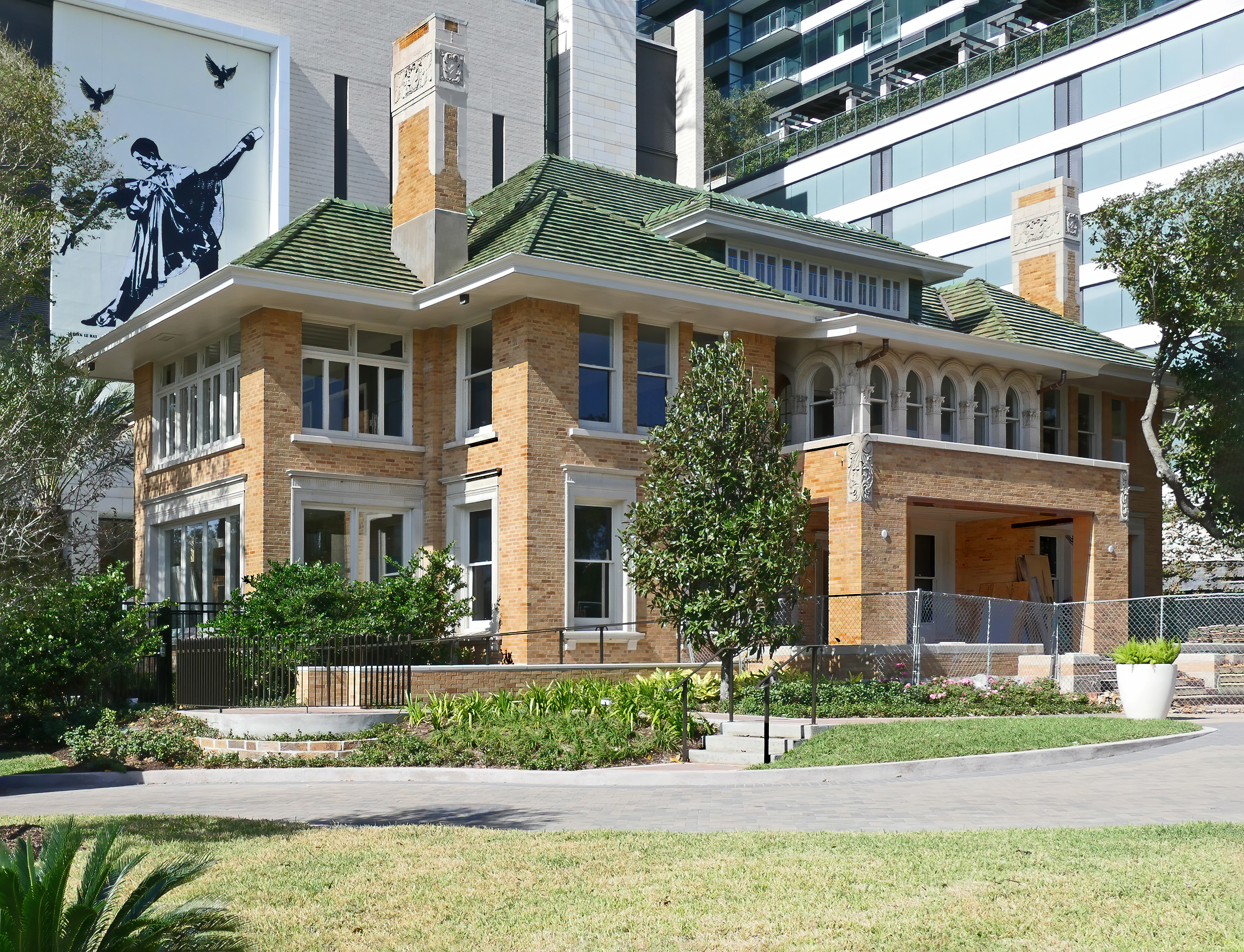
Fondren Mansion in Houston

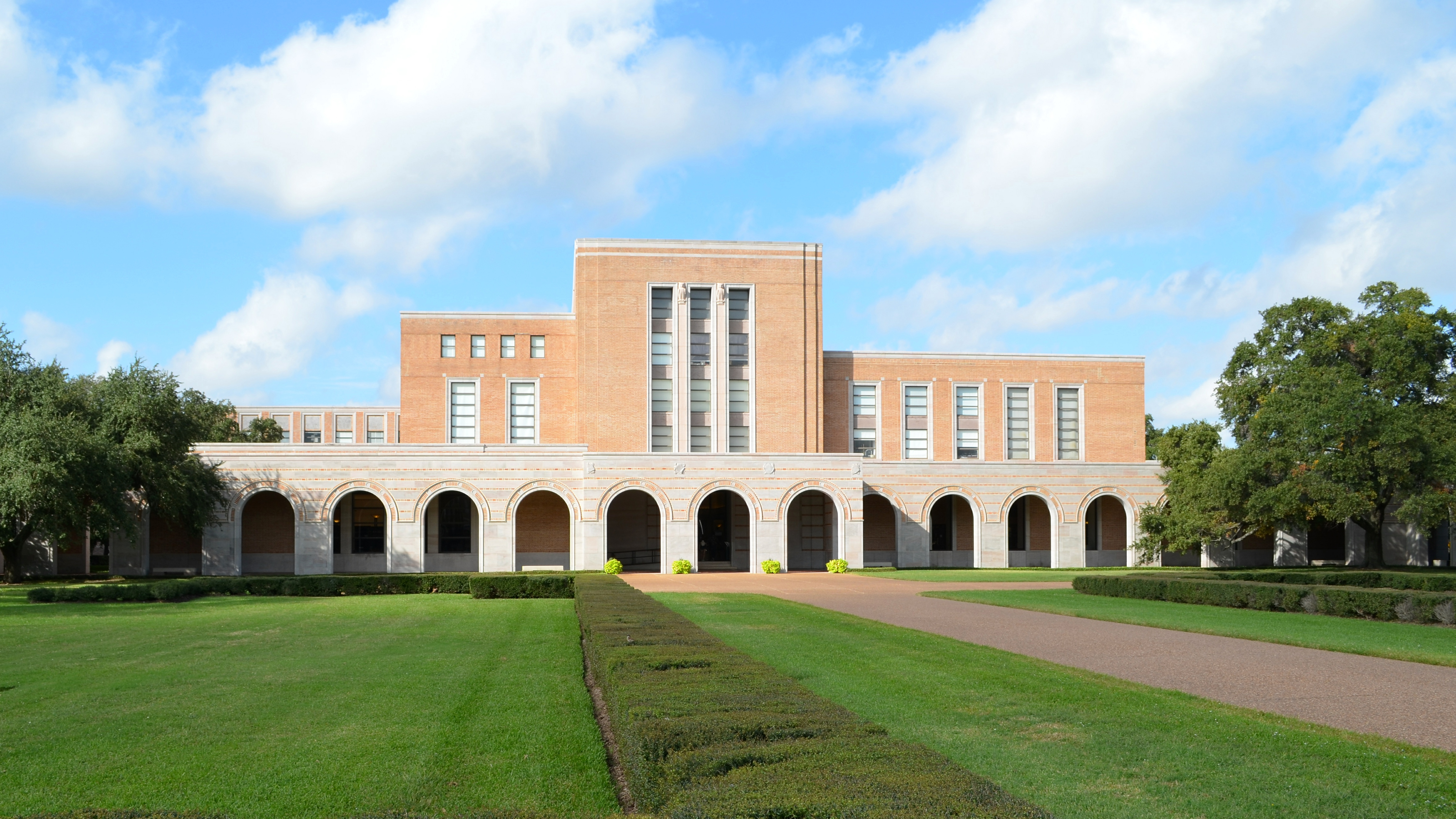
View of the Fondren Library portico (Rice University)

By the time Fondren was twenty, he translated his knowledge of drilling water wells on farms to the oilfields of Corsicana, Texas. Within a few years he was an expert oil worker and struck out on his own to extract oil from Spindletop.

He was involved with the Texas Oil Boom period.

In 1911, Fondren, with Ross S. Sterling and others, founded Humble Oil. It was later acquired by ExxonMobil.

The Fondrens established the Fondren Lectures in Religious Thought at Southern Methodist University in 1919. They gave major financial support for the construction of a new building at St. Paul's Methodist Church in 1929. In 1938, they donated nearly half a million dollars to SMU to build the Fondren Library. Walter Fondren also made large contributions to the Methodist Home for Orphans at Waco.

== Personal life ==
Fondren married Ella Florence Cochrum on 14 February 1904.

== Death and legacy ==
Fondren died on January 5, 1939, in San Antonio, Texas while attending a Methodist conference. He was first buried in Houston at Glenwood Cemetery, but re-interred at Forest Lawn Cemetery.

In 1946, the family granted $1 million to Rice University to build the Walter W. Fondren Library. Two years later Ella and the family created the Fondren Foundation. Under Ella's management, the foundation funded new construction for facilities at hospitals and institutions of higher learning.
