= Ross S. Sterling =

Governor of Texas from 1931 to 1933

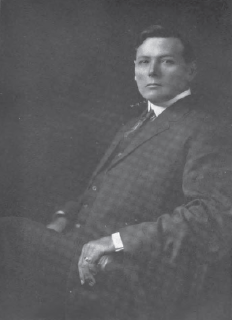

31st Governor of Texas
- In office January 20, 1931 – January 17, 1933
- Lieutenant: Edgar E. Witt
- Preceded by: Dan Moody
- Succeeded by: Miriam A. Ferguson

Personal details
- Born: Ross Shaw Sterling; February 11, 1875 Anahuac, Texas, U.S.
- Died: March 25, 1949 (aged 74) Fort Worth, Texas, U.S.
- Resting place: Glenwood Cemetery
- Party: Democratic
- Spouse: Maud Abbie Gage (m. 1898)

Ross Shaw Sterling (February 11, 1875 – March 25, 1949) was an American politician who served as the 31st governor of Texas from 1931 to 1933.

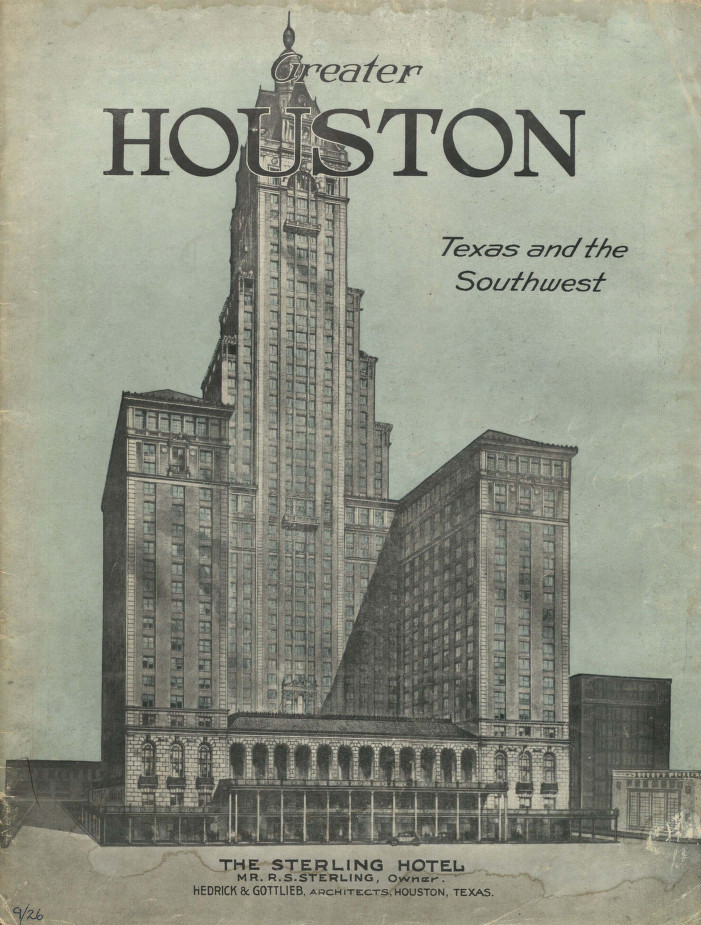
A 1926 magazine cover depicts the proposed 40-story Sterling Hotel in Houston, designed by Ross Sterling's son-in-law, architect Wyatt Hedrick; the hotel was never built.

== Early years ==
Sterling was born in Anahuac in Chambers County near Houston, Texas. He grew up on a farm and, after little formal education, began working as a clerk at the age of 12.

== Career ==
At the age of 21, Sterling launched his own merchandising business. In 1911, his brother Frank Sterling, other oilmen, and he formed the Humble Oil Company, a predecessor of present-day Exxon-Mobil. They were joined in the venture by their sister, Florence M. Sterling. Sterling and his brother Frank and his sister, Florence, were referred to as the "Trio".

In addition to the oil industry, Sterling was involved in a railroad company, the former Houston Post newspaper, banking, and real estate in the Houston area. He was a member of the Houston Port Commission. He served as chairman of the Texas Highway Commission under his predecessor, Governor Dan Moody.

== Public service ==
A Democrat who has been described by one observer as “a successful business man and a devotee of laissez-faire,” Sterling defeated former Governor Miriam "Ma" Ferguson and several other candidates in the 1930 primary race for governor. During Sterling's term in office, the East Texas oil fields experienced rapid and uncontrolled development. The Railroad Commission of Texas attempted proration, but the courts struck down the plan. Because of the chaotic situation, Sterling declared martial law in four counties for six months. National Guard troops were sent to the oil fields to limit waste and control production. This action was later declared unwarranted by the federal district court and the U.S. Supreme Court, and the Railroad Commission's plan for proration was accepted. Cotton prices continued to decline during Sterling's term in office.

Sterling's loss in the 1932 Democratic primary is the closest primary defeat for an incumbent governor in United States history. He lost to Miriam Ferguson in the run-off election by a margin of 50.2% to 49.8% with less than 4,000 votes separating the candidates.

== Personal life and death ==
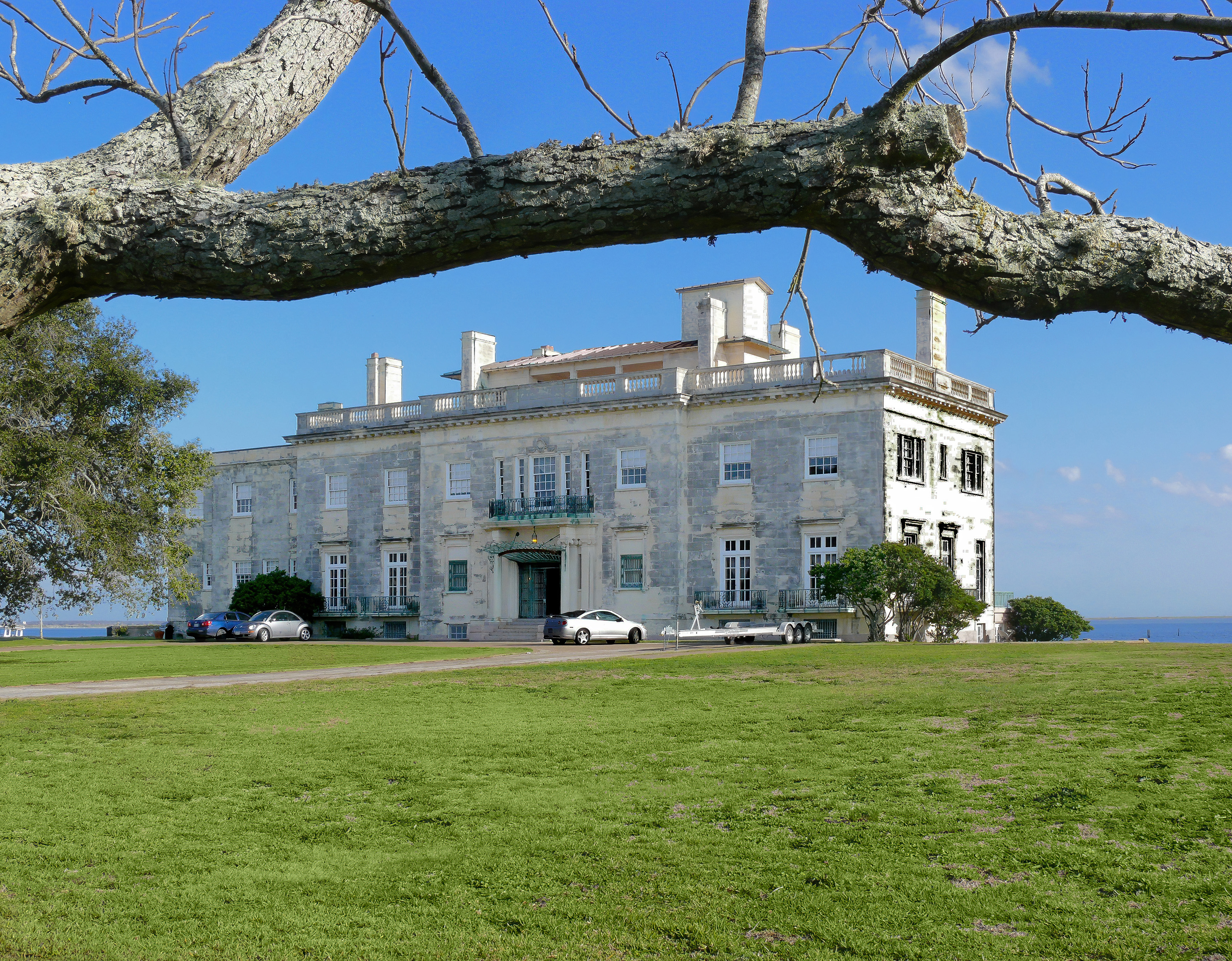
This mansion of Governor Sterling's at Morgan's point, a scaled down version of the White House, was completed in 1927

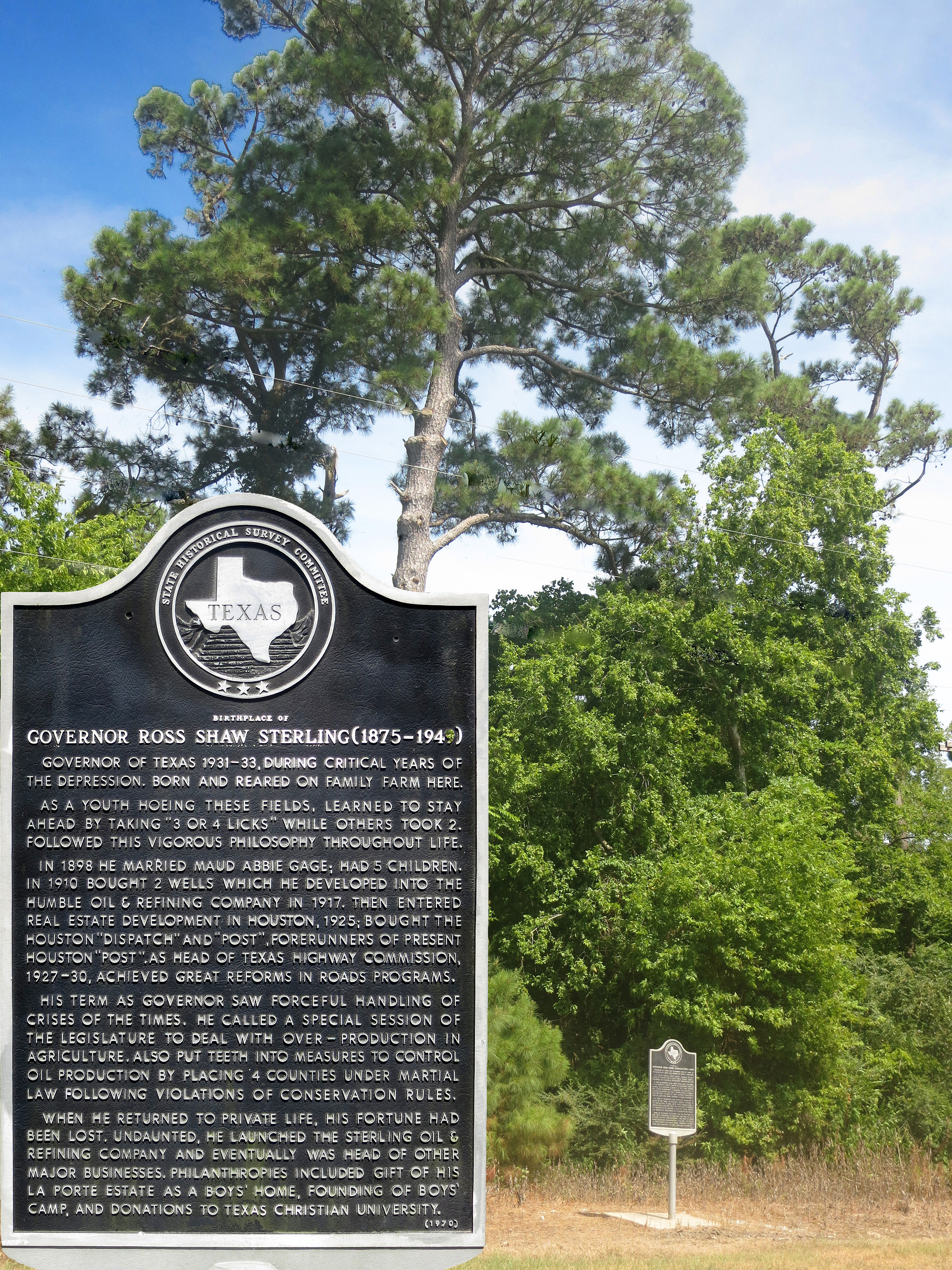
Birthplace of Governor Sterling

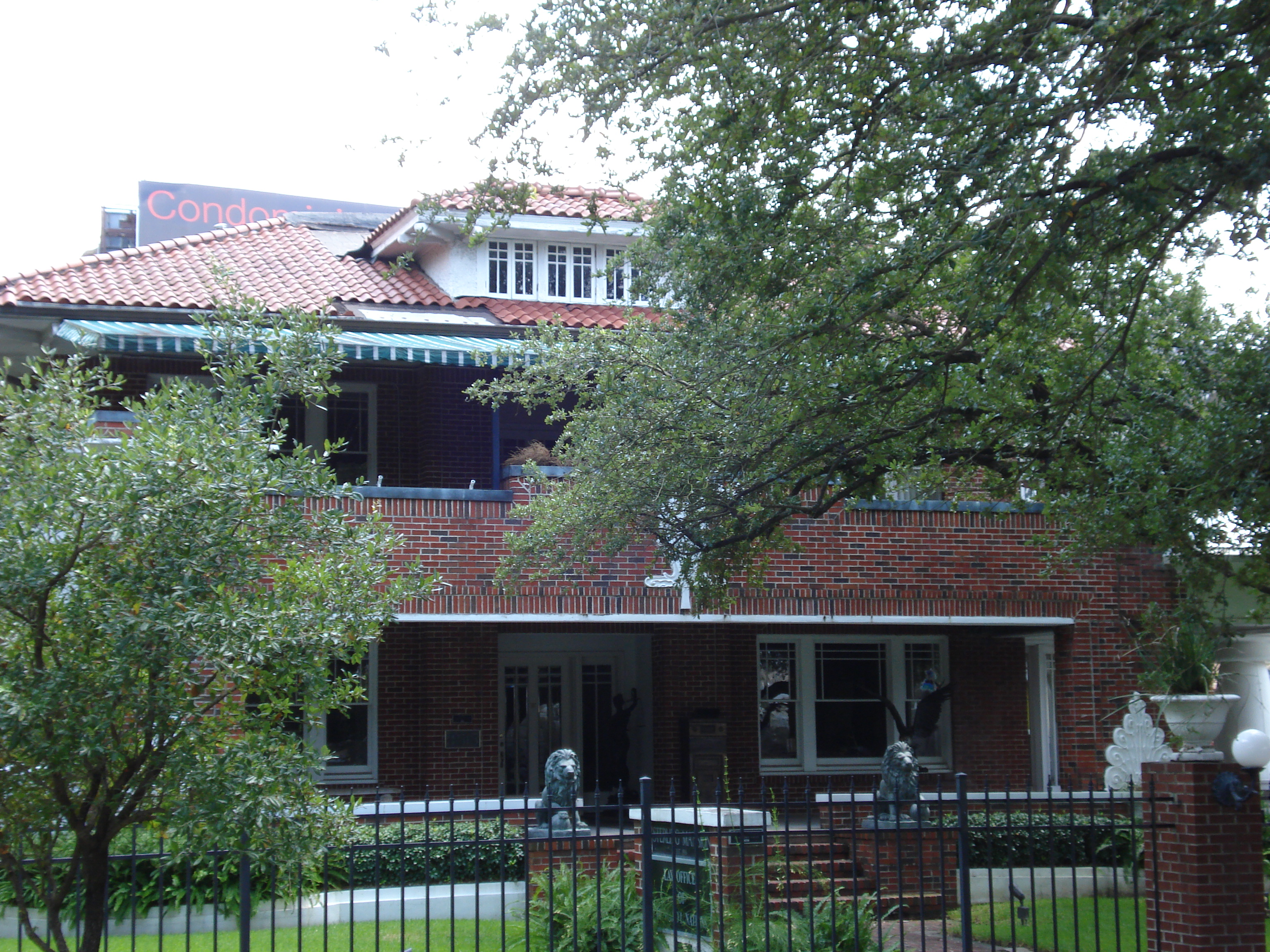
Ross Sterling's mansion in the Montrose area of Houston was built in 1916.

He wed Maud Abbie Gage on October 10, 1898.

Sterling died in Fort Worth on March 25, 1949, and is buried at Glenwood Cemetery in Houston.

Three Texas schools are named after him, Sterling High School in Baytown, Sterling High School in Houston, and Ross Sterling Middle School in Humble, Texas. In addition, his grand-nephew, Ross N. Sterling, a Republican, became a United States federal judge in Texas under appointment of U.S. President Gerald R. Ford Jr.

In 1925, Sterling's daughter Mildred married the prominent architect Wyatt C. Hedrick of Fort Worth.

Sterling's former house, built about 1910, was moved in 1999 from 106 Westheimer Road to the intersection of Bagby and Rosalie to undergo restoration. In 2015 it opened as a bar & restaurant called Sterling House

Party political offices
Preceded by Dan Moody	Democratic nominee for Governor of Texas; 1930	Succeeded by Miriam A. Ferguson
Political offices
Preceded by Dan Moody	Governor of Texas; January 20, 1931 – January 17, 1933	Succeeded by Miriam A. Ferguson
