= Houston Main Building =

Building in Houston, Texas (1952–2012)

Coordinates: 29.7055°N 95.4010°W

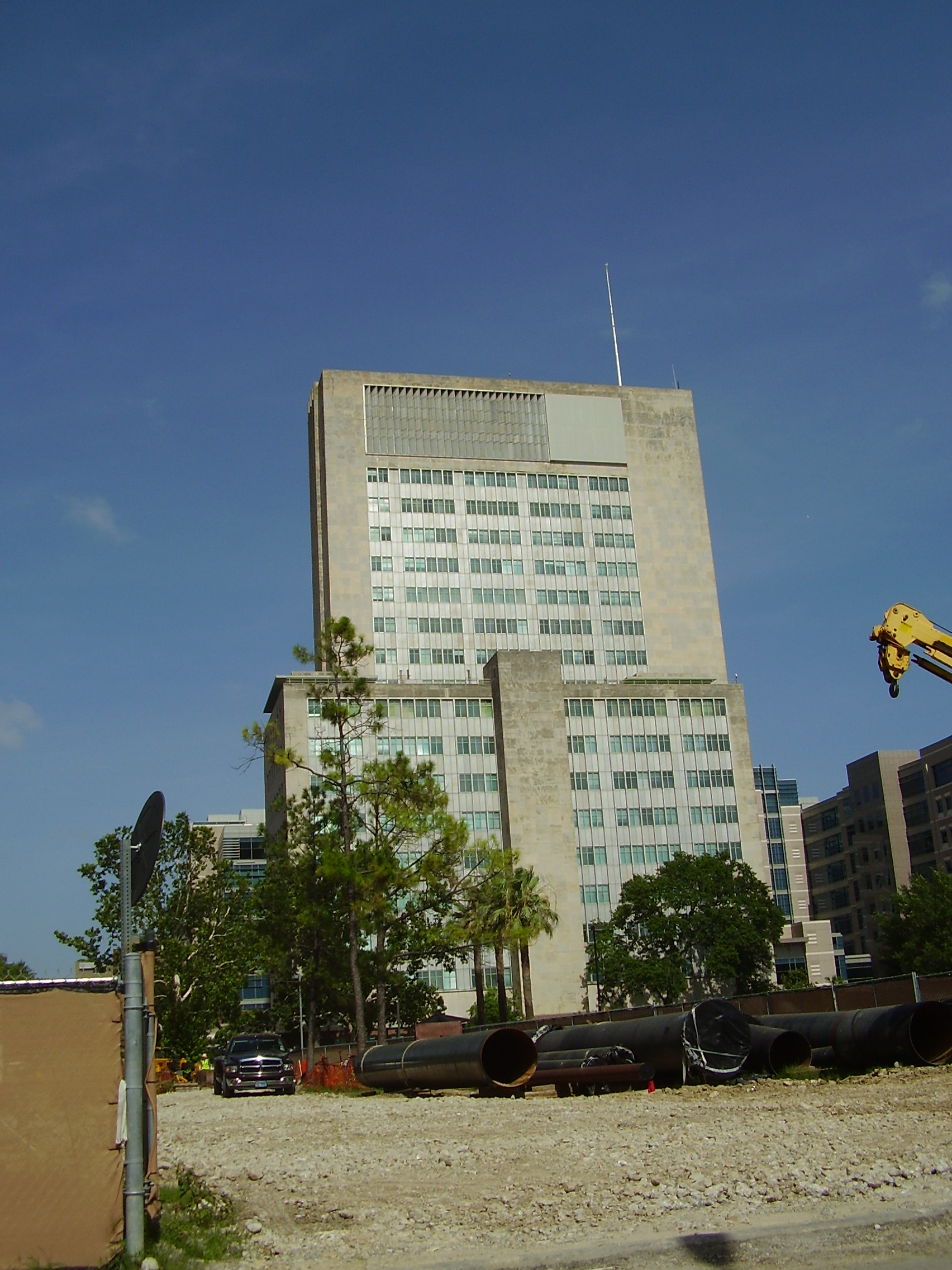
Houston Main Building

The Houston Main Building (HMB) formerly the Prudential Building, was a skyscraper in the Texas Medical Center, Houston, Texas. It originally housed offices of the Prudential Insurance Company, before becoming a part of the MD Anderson Cancer Center. The building was demolished on January 8, 2012. It was designed by Kenneth Franzheim.

== History ==
The building was built in 1952. Originally it housed the offices of the Prudential Insurance Company. The building was the first corporate high rise building established outside of Downtown Houston. The 18 story, 500,000-square-foot (46,000 m^{2}) building was designed by Kenneth Franzheim. It was among a group of regional headquarters buildings built for Prudential in the late 1940s and early 1950s. During its history the building had landscaped grounds, a swimming pool, and tennis courts. The building was made of limestone and steel. The offices in the building served the states of Arkansas, Kansas, Louisiana, Mississippi, Missouri, Oklahoma, and Texas.

The MD Anderson Cancer Center bought the building in 1974. MD Anderson paid $18.5 million for the Prudential Building, which is located on a 22.5-acre (9.1 ha) site.

In 2002 MD Anderson announced that it planned to demolish the building and replace it with a four-story medical campus. Area preservationists opposed the plan. William Daigneau, the vice president of operations and facilities, said that renovating the buildings would be too costly. In 2008 Daigneau said that the building was slowly disintegrating. MD Anderson planned to have the building demolished around 2010. Local and state preservationists protested the proposed demolition. David Bush of the Greater Houston Preservation Alliance said that the building would be eligible for listing on the National Register of Historic Places. Bush also said that the organization had been told unofficially that demolishing the structure would damage equipment in adjoining structures, so he said the organization believed that the building would not be demolished. A 2007 BusinessWeek article said that demolishing the Houston Main Building would cost $6 million. Daigneau said that a pair of clinic buildings would replace the Houston Main Building.

== Architecture ==
Stephen Fox, an architectural historian from Rice University, said that the building was "finely built, finely finished office building that, because of its beautiful materials, generous public spaces and carefully integrated installation of art works, feels more like a public building than an office building." He also described the Houston Main Building as "a model of urbane construction in a suburban setting."

== Tenants ==
The M. D. Anderson Alumni and Faculty Association was located in the tower. Departments of the University of Texas Health Science Center at Houston housed in the Houston Main Building included several academic support departments and the University of Texas School of Nursing at Houston.

The nursing school moved into the School of Nursing and Student Community Center building. The Faculty Center tower, which opened in Spring 2008, now houses several academic support departments of the University of Texas Health Science Center.

== Facilities ==
The Houston Main Building (HMB) Exercise Room was located in HMB.B240 in the basement. A lighted .25-mile (0.40 km) jogging track was located on the west side of the building.

== Mural ==
A fresco, titled "The Future Belongs To Those Who Prepare For It," was located in the Prudential Building. The fresco, 16 feet (4.9 m) by 47 feet (14 m), depicts life on a farm in West Texas. The Prudential Life Insurance Company commissioned the mural from the artist Peter Hurd. The company wanted to evoke its motto, which was used as the painting's title. To create the mural, Hurd used construction workers as his models. Hurd himself appears as a soil conservation agent in the work.

Ann Hale, the director of the Hurd La Rinconada Gallery in San Patricio, unincorporated Lincoln County, New Mexico, estimated the value of the painting at over $3 million. Hale said that the museum had been working with several private individuals and universities to try to get the mural moved, but she said that there were "no real solid prospects." Hale said that there were people wanted the mural, but they would have to take the responsibility for moving it. The vice president of MD Anderson, Bill Daigneau, said in 2008 the structural problems in the building are cracking the mural. Daigneau also said that the fresco "does not reflect the values of M.D. Anderson. ... There's the issue of who's running the farm, and who's working on it." The fresco portrays African Americans carrying hay. According to Daigneau, polled MD Anderson employees and faculty opposed installing the mural in a new area.

By 2008 no deal to remove the fresco from the building had been finalized due to the cost of removing the mural. M.D. Anderson stated that it would give away the mural, located in the building's lobby, for no charge. Allan Turner of the Houston Chronicle said that removing the mural, restoring it, and installing it in a new location would cost over $500,000. Peter Marzio, the director of the Museum of Fine Arts, Houston, said that the museum was approached about possibly accepting the mural. Marzio said that the museum rejected the fresco because it was too "site specific." In 2010 a benefactor from Artesia, New Mexico agreed to have the mural removed. The mural will become a part of the public library of Artesia.
