= Frank Sterling =

American businessman (1869–1938)

Frank Prior Sterling (October 26, 1869 – July 16, 1938) was an American oilman and oil industry businessperson, based in Houston, Texas.

Sterling and his brothers grew up on Double Bayou in Chambers County, southern Texas. They were ambitious and built a sail boat to carry vegetables to Galveston for sale.

== Career ==
Frank Sterling was one of nine founders of the Humble Oil & Refining Company of Houston, Texas in 1911. Their first wells were in the Humble, Texas area. Frank Sterling, who was a post-production expert, became a Vice President of Humble in 1921.

Humble Oil was one of the best oil & gas finding companies in the history of petroleum exploration. Humble Oil merged with Standard Oil of New Jersey to form Exxon, Inc., the present day ExxonMobil corporation.

Ross S. Sterling, Frank Sterling's brother, was the first president of Humble Oil, and later became the Governor of Texas in 1930. Florence Sterling, Frank Sterling's sister, also worked at Humble Oil and became its Corporate Secretary.

== Family ==
Frank and Isla Sterling

Frank Sterling married Isla Randa Carroll (b. 1885) of Temple, Texas. In 1925, Frank and Isla Sterling built a house designed by John Staub, located on Lot 5/1505 South Boulevard in the fashionable Broadacres subdivision of Houston. The Sterling Mansion was donated to the Houston Museum of Fine Arts in 1948, but in 1951 it was sold by the museum to Gus Wortham. Lyndall Wortham bequeathed the house to the University of Houston on her death in July 1980, to be used as a residence for the University President.

Carroll Sterling

Frank and Isla had one child, a daughter, Carroll Sterling. In the early 1930s, Carroll Sterling married Bert F. Winston. They had two children: Isla Sterling Winston and Bert Winston. After divorcing Bert Winston in the 1940s, Carrol Sterling married John Cowan, who later died in a plane crash around 1950. Carroll Sterling Cowan then married Harris Masterson III with whom she built the "Rienzi" mansion. Upon their deaths "Rienzi" was formally given to the Houston Museum of Fine Arts.

Carroll Sterling Masterson's daughter, Isla Sterling Carroll Winston, married businessman Thomas Radcliffe Reckling III in 1957. They had eight children, Cliffe, Christiana, Stephen, Randa, Carroll, James, Thomas, and John.

Isla Reckling and her family of eight children and numerous grandchildren still maintain a strong interest in "Rienzi" and its operational affairs within the museum.

== See also ==
- American businesspeople in the oil industry
