= 275 Madison Avenue =

Office building in Manhattan, New York

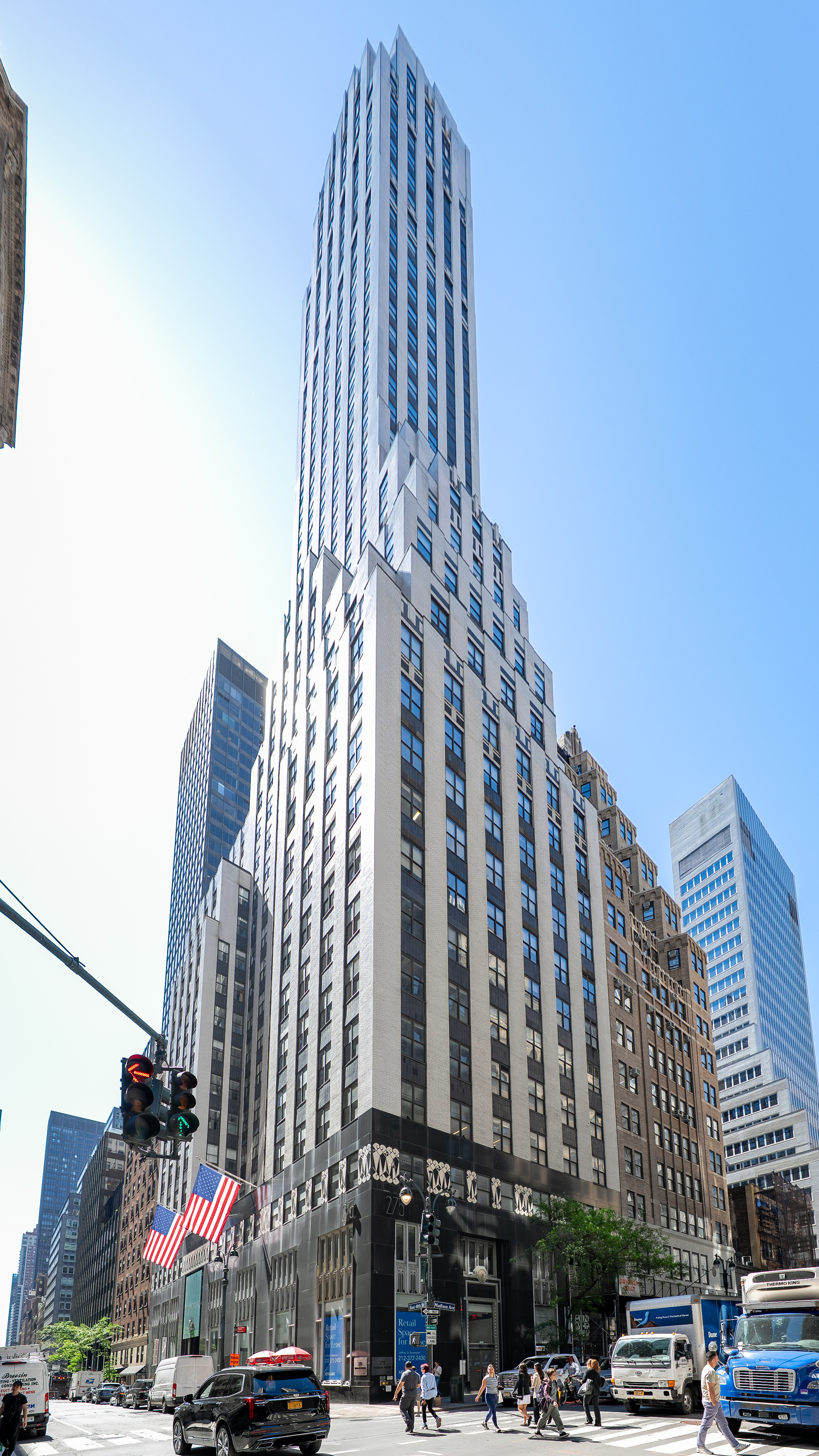
- Seen from across Madison Avenue and 40th Street
- Interactive map of the 275 Madison Avenue area

General information
- Architectural style: Art Deco
- Location: Manhattan, New York
- Coordinates: 40°45′04″N 73°58′48″W
- Construction started: 1930
- Completed: 1931

Height
- Roof: 503 ft (153 m)

Technical details
- Floor count: 43

Design and construction
- Architect: Kenneth Franzheim
- Developer: Houston Properties
- Main contractor: Dwight P. Robinson Company

New York City Landmark
- Designated: January 13, 2009
- Reference no.: 2286

275 Madison Avenue (also known as the Johns-Manville Building, American Home Products Building, and 22 East 40th Street) is a 43-story office building in the Murray Hill neighborhood of Manhattan in New York City. It is along the southeast corner of Madison Avenue and 40th Street, near Grand Central Terminal. The building, constructed from 1930 to 1931, was designed by Kenneth Franzheim in a mixture of the Art Deco and International styles.

275 Madison Avenue's three-story base is made of polished granite and contains large openings. On all the other floors, the facade contains vertical pilasters of white brick, as well as dark spandrels between windows, which were intended to give a vertical emphasis to the exterior. The 4th through 23rd floors contain several setbacks to comply with the 1916 Zoning Resolution. The building tapers to a rectangular cross-section on the 24th through 43rd floors. The interior of the base is designed with a main entrance lobby on 40th Street, as well as storefronts. Floor areas above the base range from 2,300 to 10,000 square feet (210 to 930 m^{2}).

275 Madison Avenue was developed by Houston Properties, a firm headed by Texas entrepreneur Jesse H. Jones. It was originally known as 22 East 40th Street. The skyscraper opened at the onset of the Great Depression, and Houston Properties sold the skyscraper in 1933 to the New York Trust Company. In the mid-20th century, 275 Madison Avenue had several owners and was also known for major tenants Johns Manville and American Home Products. It has been owned by the RPW Group since 2016. The New York City Landmarks Preservation Commission designated 275 Madison Avenue as an official landmark in 2009.

== Site ==
275 Madison Avenue is in the Murray Hill neighborhood of Manhattan in New York City, just outside of Midtown. It is bounded by Madison Avenue to the west and 40th Street to the north. The L-shaped land lot covers 12,350 square feet (1,147 m^{2}) with a frontage of 74.08 feet (22.58 m) on Madison Avenue and 150 feet (46 m) on 40th Street. Nearby buildings include the Stavros Niarchos Foundation Library and 10 East 40th Street to the west, 461 Fifth Avenue and 18 East 41st Street to the northeast, the Lefcourt Colonial Building to the north, and 101 Park Avenue to the northeast. Grand Central Terminal is two blocks to the north.

In the mid-19th century, the surrounding section of Murray Hill was developed as an upscale residential district, with the estates of many prominent families. Among these estates were three houses at 273, 275, and 277 Madison Avenue, all built in 1862 on lots measuring 25 feet (7.6 m) wide. The three residences served as "the homes of many distinguished citizens of New York". (Note: The houses at number 273, 275, and 277 were respectively occupied by professor Morris Loeb, businessman John Terry, and General Horace Porter.) Also on the site were two stables built before 1910 at the addresses 24 and 26 East 40th Street. By 1920, commercial concerns had relocated to the area, which The New York Times called "a great civic centre". The New York Trust Company acquired the old mansion at 277 Madison Avenue in 1922, where it opened a banking branch, and antique bookstore Rosenbach Company occupied number 273 starting in 1920. The Metropolitan Realty Company had planned a 14-story building at 24 and 26 East 40th Street in 1925, but it was not built.

== Architecture ==
275 Madison Avenue was designed by Kenneth Franzheim and built by the Dwight P. Robinson Company for Houston Properties. It has also been known as 22 East 40th Street, the Johns-Manville Building, (Note: There was another Johns-Manville Building one block north, at Madison Avenue and 41st Street; it was built in 1912.) and the American Home Products Building. The building was designed in the Art Deco style with elements of the International Style. It consists of 43 stories and measures 503 feet (153 m) from ground level to the roof. The New York Herald Tribune gave a slightly different figure of 42 stories and 505 feet (154 m).

When completed in 1931, the building was one of the more distinct skyscrapers in the city. The Wall Street Journal called it a structure "of novel aspect". The building was also depicted in photographer Berenice Abbott's Changing New York pictorial series. According to architectural critic Carter B. Horsley, 275 Madison Avenue and the nearby 295 Madison Avenue were "two of the city's better Art Deco towers", though Horsley regarded number 295 as the better of the two.

=== Form ===
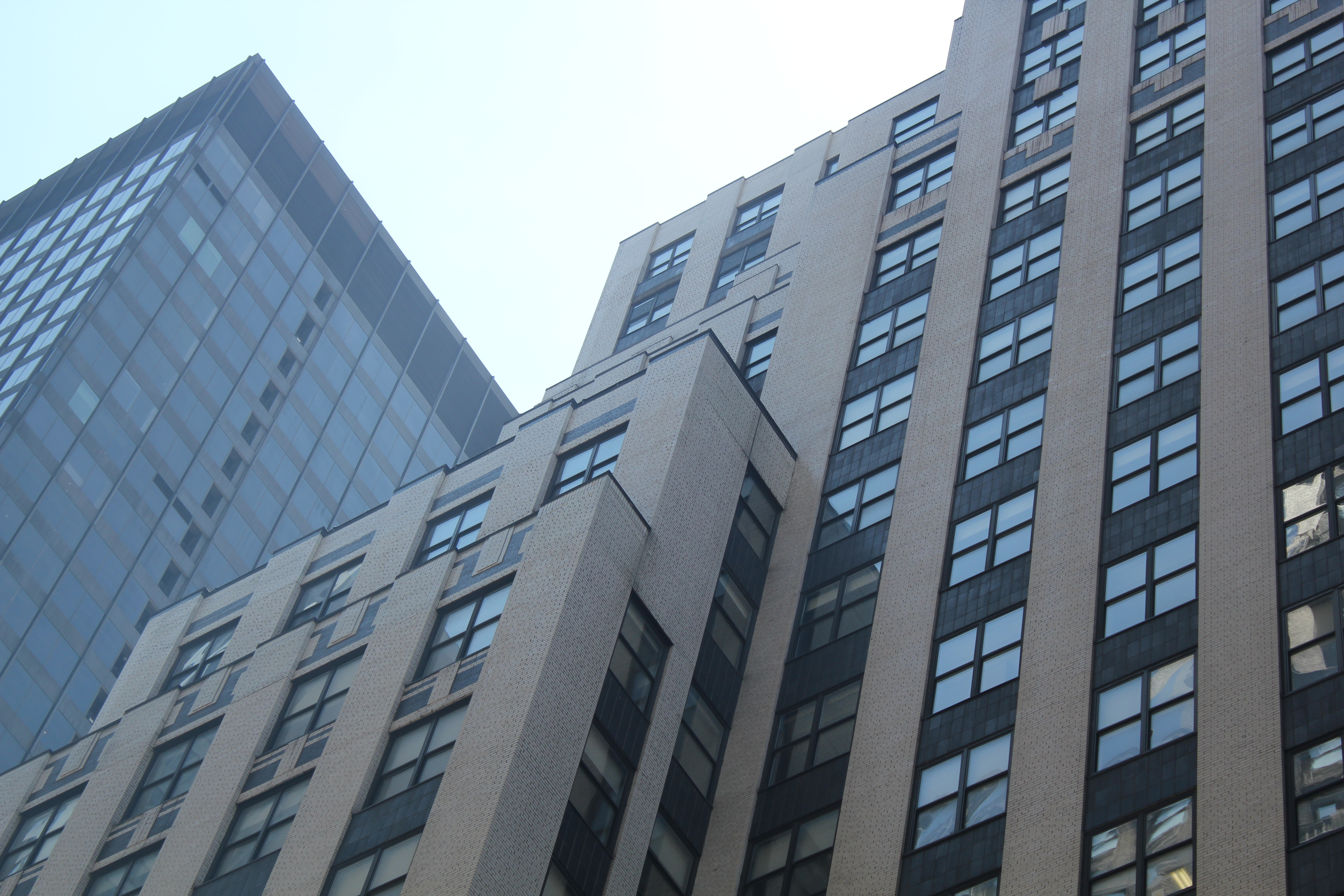
The easternmost four bays on 40th Street have setbacks at the 10th and 12th floor; the westernmost four bays have a similar series of setbacks.

275 Madison Avenue is designed with a three-story base of black granite, above which is a 40-story tower clad with white brick and dark terracotta. The building contains setbacks on the 4th through 23rd stories to comply with the 1916 Zoning Resolution. The setbacks taper to a rectangular tower on the 24th through 43rd stories. The setbacks were designed with over thirty terraces ranging from 30 to 1,500 square feet (2.8 to 139.4 m^{2}). The larger terraces generally face east and west while the smaller terraces generally face north.

The 40th Street elevation has fourteen vertical bays at the 4th story, with the center six bays being recessed in a light court between four bays on either side. The center bays form a stepped "peak" with setbacks at the 18th through 21st floors. According to architectural writer Robert A. M. Stern, the pyramidal setbacks resembled those on the nearby Chanin Building. The four bays to the west and east have setbacks at the 10th and 12th floors. The Madison Avenue elevation has six bays on the 4th through 12th stories, above which is a setback. There are also setbacks at the 14th, 17th, and 20th stories of the northern and western elevations. The eastern elevation rises from the lot line until the 23rd story, where it sets back to the eastern wall of the top twenty stories.

In addition, the top of the tower contains notched corners with small terraces in each corner. The tower's roof was originally flat, but a two-story penthouse was added after the building's completion. The southwestern notch was removed at that time.

=== Facade ===
The black granite of the base was quarried in Pennsylvania. The base is designed with black and silver ornamentation, though many of the silver ornament is painted. The base's color scheme was similar to that of the Fuller Building on Madison Avenue and 57th Street, as well as the Bloomingdale's building on Lexington Avenue. The tower's fenestration, or arrangement of window openings, is different than that of the base. Generally, the tower stories contain vertical pilasters of white brick, which separate the bays of windows. Within each bay, the windows on different floors are separated by spandrels made of terracotta tiles. The white glazed brick was made in Ohio, while the 1,060 metal window frames were made in West Virginia.

==== Base ====
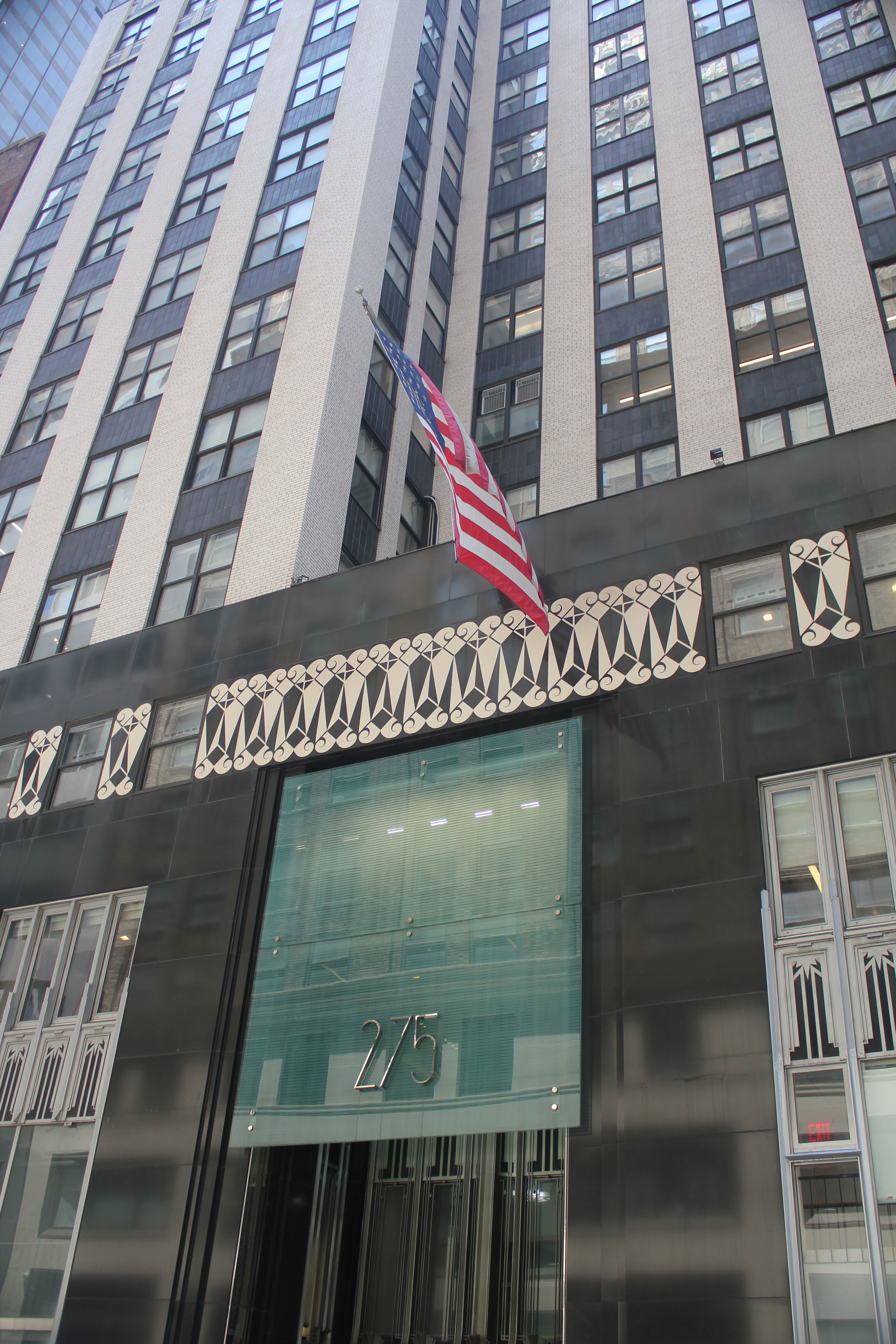
The main entrance at 40th Street has a translucent glass pane over it, as well as silver geometric motifs and flagpoles at the third floor.

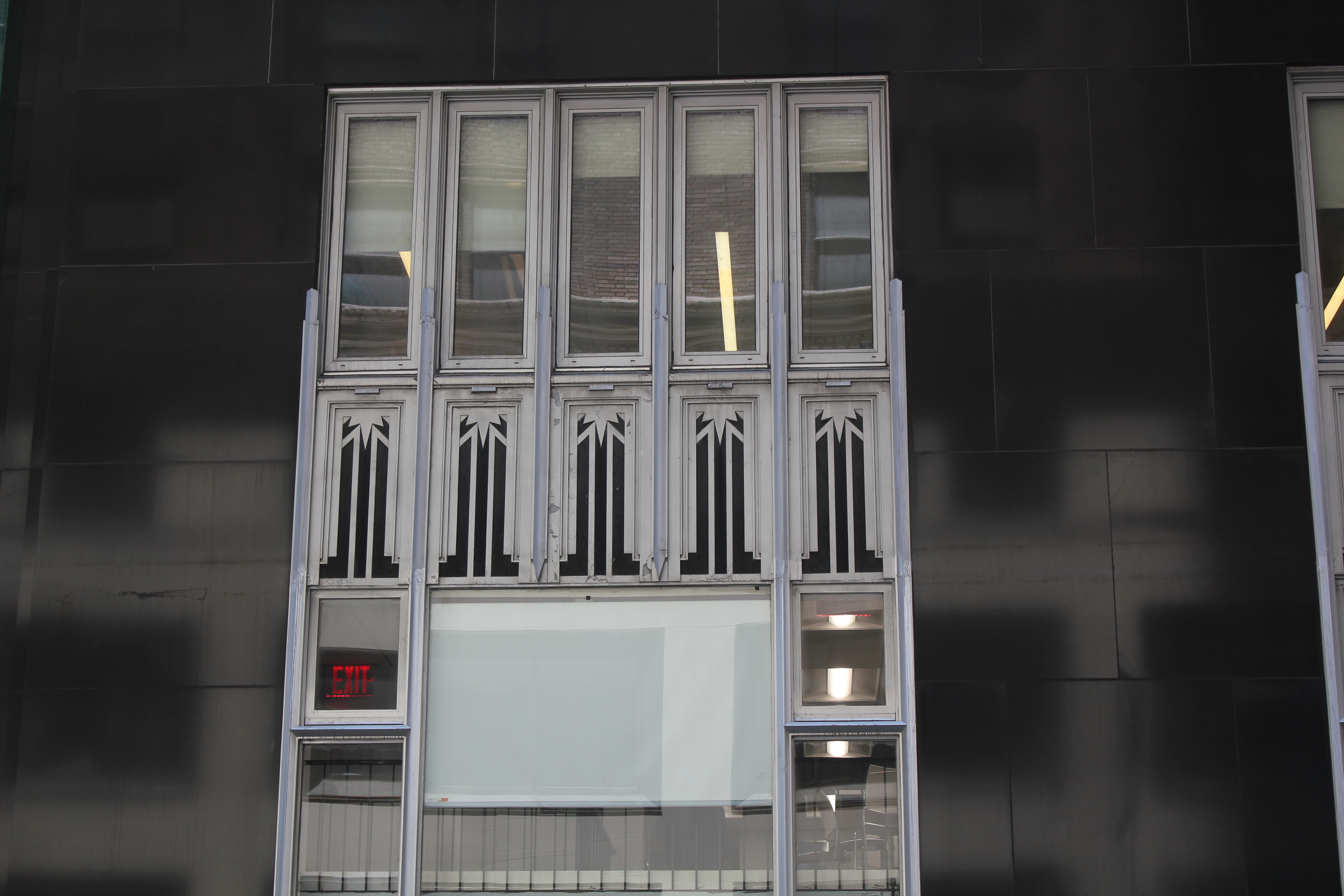
One of the window bays west of the entrance. The top of the opening has five spandrels and mezzanine windows, separated horizontally by vertical metal mullions. The ground level has a triple-width window flanked by three smaller panes.

The northern elevation on 40th Street contains eight bays; the main entrance is recessed in the fifth bay from the west. The main entrance has revolving and swinging metal doors, above which is a black metal transom bar with the words "275 Madison Avenue". Atop this bar is a transom window split into four rows of five panes. The panes are separated by vertical mullions, which are flared at the bottom and contain seashell-shaped lighting sconces between them. From top to bottom, the rows of openings contain plain windows, sash windows, rectangular metal spandrels, and plain windows. The metal spandrels contain a black representation of a skyscraper with part of a silver "starburst" motif at the top. The starburst motifs may represent the Lone Star State, the state nickname of Texas, where Houston Properties was based. To the left and right of the main entrance are metal grilles with full starburst motifs. On the left wall of the entryway is a metal door. Above the entryway and slightly in front of the building's outer wall, there is a translucent glass panel with the metal characters "275".

West (right) of the main entrance, in the first through fourth bays from west, are large openings. The openings are each split into three parts: the ground level, ornamented "skyscraper" spandrels, and mezzanine. Each opening has five sets of mezzanine windows above spandrels, which are separated by vertical metal mullions. The ground-level portions of these openings contain a triple-width window flanked by smaller panes. East (left) of the main entrance are three narrower bays. In both the sixth and eighth bays, the ground floor contains large window panes, and there are four sets of spandrel–windows. In the seventh bay, the ground floor has a metal door, topped by a vent and a window pane, as well as signage. The seventh bay has three spandrel–windows, with the center spandrel–window being wider than the outer ones.

The western elevation on Madison Avenue has four bays. The second bay from north has a recessed entrance, which leads to the ground-story banking space inside and was the main entrance prior to 2004. Above the entrance doorway are four windows; the space beneath these window panes is taken up by an octagonal clock and a sign. The first and third bays from north, respectively to the left and right of the Madison Avenue banking entrance, contain a large window pane at ground level and three spandrel–windows above. The fourth bay from north is seven spandrels wide, but there are ventilation grates instead of windows at the mezzanine. This bay has a double door of metal and glass, which leads to a storefront, as well as a shop window.

The third floor has a set of window openings on both 40th Street and Madison Avenue. Along 40th Street, the third-floor window openings are asymmetrically arranged on either side of the main entrance, with twelve to the west (right) of the entrance and six to the east (left). All except one of these openings contain sash windows; the remaining opening has a louver. The openings are separated by silver geometric motifs. Architectural writer Christopher Gray wrote that the motifs "could be kissing owls, or hooded figures, or the face cards in a deck from another planet". This motif is repeated several times above the main entrance, which is flanked by two flagpoles. On Madison Avenue, there are eight such openings, separated by geometric motifs. Two of these openings have two sash windows each, while the others have one sash window each.

==== Tower ====
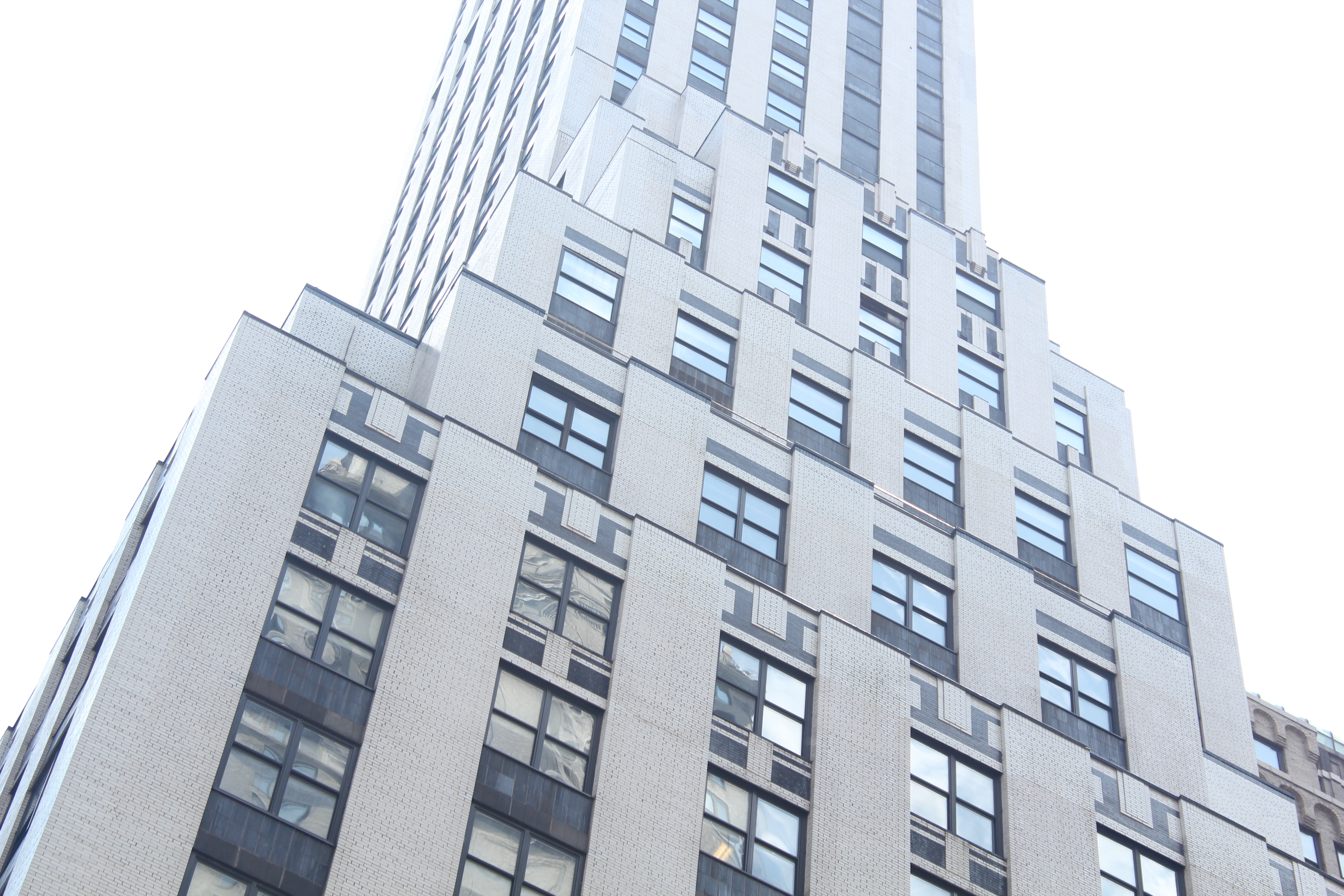
View of the tower's setbacks along Madison Avenue.

The 4th through 43rd stories have pilasters of continuous white brick, alternating with bays of windows and spandrels. The windows were designed to be flush with the brick. Franzheim avoided decorative elements such as cornices, entablatures, and pediments, as he wanted the building to be "shadow-less". Instead, the tower was to rely exclusively on the contrast between white and black materials for decoration. Terracotta spandrels, between the white pilasters, separate the windows on different stories; they were meant to emphasize the building's height. According to Stern, the spandrels were inspired by those on Raymond Hood's nearby Daily News Building.

The northern and western elevations of the 4th through 23rd stories are designed with white pilasters and dark spandrels, with a few exceptions. At some of the setbacks on the northern and western elevations, the black spandrels are decorated with white-brick geometric shapes. Some of the setbacks also have ornamented white-brick lintels just beneath them. The eastern elevation below the 23rd story has windows within an otherwise flat white-brick wall. The southern elevation below the 23rd story only has windows at the setbacks.

Above the 23rd story, the tower rises as a rectangular shaft, with six bays on the northern elevation and five bays each on the western and eastern elevations. This gives the tower an almost square shape. The two southernmost bays on the western elevation have black panels. The south elevation has eight bays, of which only the three easternmost bays have windows. has black vertical stripes in the first, third, fourth, and fifth bays from west and a pipe in the second bay from the west; only the three easternmost bays have windows. The top of the shaft has a few geometric decorations, similar to those used on the lower section of the tower. The rooftop parapet originally had black-and-white chevron-shaped motifs as well as projecting white brick at the tops of the pilasters. At the roof is a two-story penthouse, which has ribbon windows, steel walls, and chamfered corners. A metal pipe railing and two tiers of rooftop terraces are at the top of the penthouse.

=== Features ===
The entrance lobbies had floor surfaces made of Belgian black marble and walls of French black marble. The marble lobby has a motif of a star, as well as nickel trim in the Art Deco style. Walker & Gillette designed a bank branch for the New York Trust Company in the first floor, mezzanine, and basement. The branch had bronze tellers' cages, marble-clad main floor, and a Venetian-terrazzo floor in the basement's 4,000-square-foot (370 m^{2}) safe-deposit vaults. The main banking walls were made of English oak and embedded nickel bronze, as well as Byzantine and Belgian black marble. The vault walls were made of an 18-inch (460 mm) layer of reinforced concrete and a 1-inch (25 mm) layer of plate steel. As of 2014, the former banking space was being marketed as a conventional retail space, with 2,950 square feet (274 m^{2}) in the basement, 3,975 square feet (369.3 m^{2}) on the first floor, and 1,050 square feet (98 m^{2}) on the mezzanine. These stories all had ceiling heights of 20 feet (6.1 m).

The elevators were split into two banks: local elevators, which traveled from the ground story to the 22nd floor, and express elevators, which traveled from the 22nd to 42nd floors. The elevators were originally designed to run at a top speed of 1,000 feet per minute (300 m/min). According to Franzheim, it would only take a 42nd-story tenant fifty seconds to travel to the ground story "under normal traffic conditions". The building's elevators had exotic woods from numerous countries.

The upper stories had floor areas between 2,300 and 10,000 square feet (210 and 930 m^{2}). The building had a total rentable area of either 220,000 square feet (20,000 m^{2}), 225,000 square feet (20,900 m^{2}), or 230,000 square feet (21,000 m^{2}). The gross floor area was 275,000 square feet (25,500 m^{2}). The walls of the upper-story corridors were clad with French black marble, while the floors had Belgian black marble interspersed with chips of Italian white marble. Upper-story offices were also wainscoted in French black marble. Walls and partitions were made of tiles and terracotta from across the United States, which were combined with clay from New Jersey. Interior walls were designed so they were, on average, only 22 feet (6.7 m) from the windows. A three-story suite at the top of the building had a private elevator and staircases, as well as executive offices and a greenhouse area. Franzheim, the building's architect, originally used these executive offices.

== History ==
275 Madison Avenue was developed by Jesse H. Jones, who had been a major real estate developer in the early 20th century, particularly in Houston, Texas. Jones expressed interest in developing buildings in New York City and, in 1923, he founded Houston Properties, headed by Alfred B. Jones of New Jersey. Kenneth Franzheim was involved in designing several of Houston Properties' developments; he was part of a relatively small "business family" from which Jesse Jones tended to hire.

=== Development ===
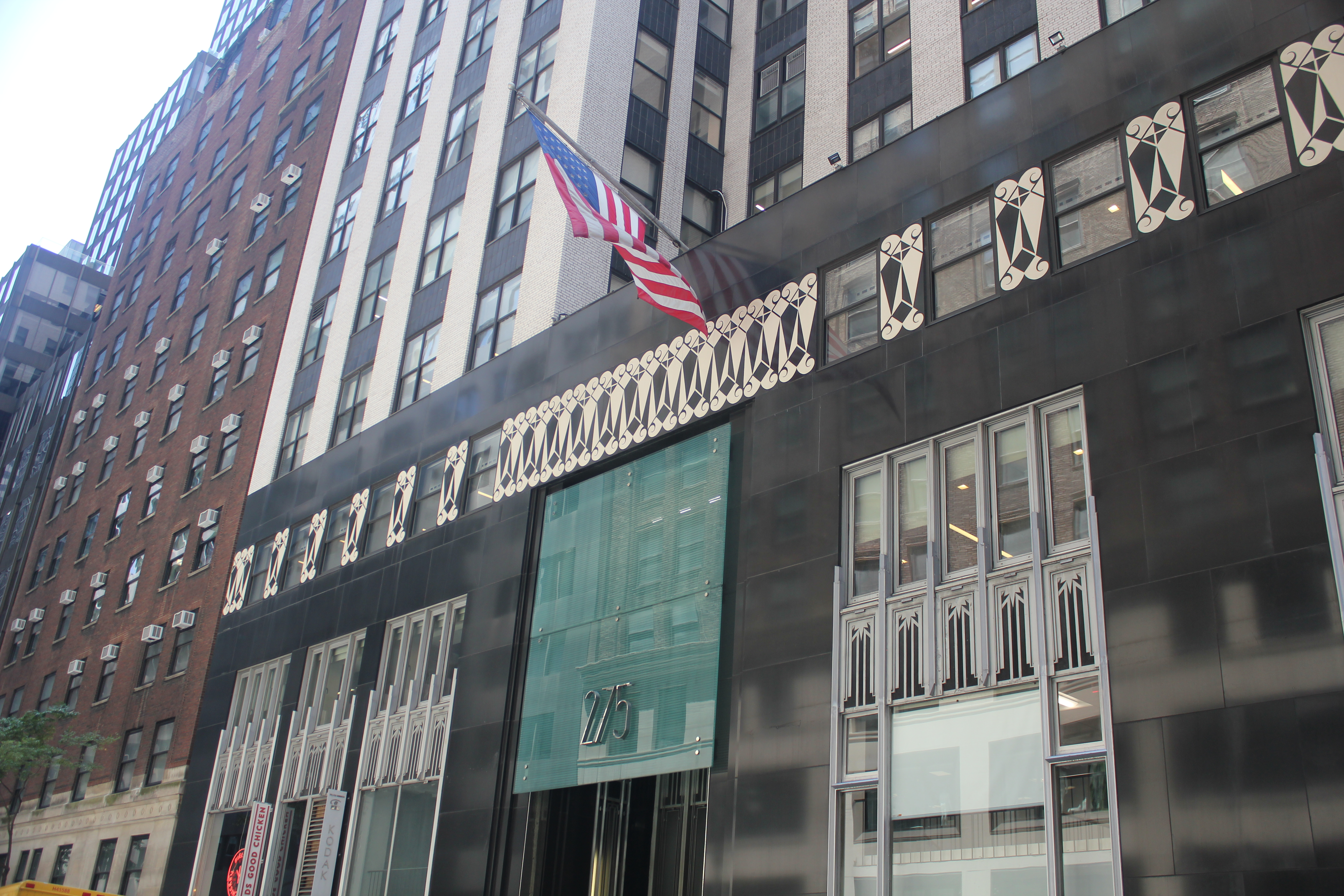
Detail of the building's base

In July 1929, the New York Trust Company acquired the property at 275 Madison Avenue, abutting its branch office at number 277. The next month, Philip H. Rosenbach of the Rosenbach Company sold number 273 to the 273 Madison Avenue Corporation. In April 1930, Jesse Jones approached both the New York Trust Company and the owner of 273 Madison Avenue with the intent of acquiring a site large enough for "a tall office building". Frederick Brown had been under contract to purchase number 273, and Jesse Jones intended to lease the site from Brown. Jesse Jones had acquired number 273, as well as two stables on 24 and 26 East 40th Streets, by the following month. He then created the 277 Madison Avenue Corporation. This was part of Jones's frequent practice of creating different companies to operate his building so issues with one property would not affect the others.

In preparation for the skyscraper's construction, New York Trust received authorization in May 1930 to open a temporary branch across the street at 274 Madison Avenue. The bank also leased some space in the proposed skyscraper. Plans for the skyscraper, then called 22 East 40th Street, were filed at the end of June 1930. The structure was slated to cost $1.25 million. The Title Guarantee and Trust Company gave the 277 Madison Avenue Corporation a seven-year, $440,000 mortgage, and the project also received a $3.2 million loan. The old residences were demolished starting on June 21, 1930, and excavations began at the end of the following month, July 31. The steelwork was constructed starting on September 4, followed by the brick four weeks later on October 3. The building had topped out by December 1930. The New York Times published several articles about 22 East 40th Street while it was under construction. Jesse Jones had taken out a Reconstruction Finance Corporation loan to fund the building's construction.

=== 1930s and 1940s ===
In early 1931, New York Trust temporarily moved out of its existing offices to allow the completion of the skyscraper. The New York Trust bank branch at 22 East 40th Street opened in July 1931. The renting agents, Cross & Brown, ran advertisements proclaiming that the building was being developed in "Uptown Wall Street" and promising "superior floor arrangements". Among the earliest office tenants were the Aeronautical Chamber of Commerce, the American Bankers Association, the American Safety Razor Company, the Radio Manufacturers Association, accounting firm Haskins & Sells, paper distributor Gottesman & Co., and Swedish royal family relative Folke Bernadotte. Franzheim's office and engineering companies Fish & Loenenger and Krey & Hunt took the top three floors. The early tenants also included law firms, a publicist, a real estate broker, and publishers, as well as attorneys and a firm of sales management engineers.

Houston Properties ran into financial difficulties soon after it completed the building. This came with a general downturn in real estate development in the area caused by the Depression. In July 1932, the 275 Madison Avenue Corporation filed a lawsuit against the 277 Madison Avenue Corporation to foreclose on a $5.5 million second mortgage on 22 East 40th Street. The 275 Madison Avenue Corporation was operated by New York Trust, which took over operations in 1933. After the Johns Manville Corporation leased six floors at 22 East 40th Street for its general headquarters in January 1933, the building also became known for the company. Some receivers were named for the building, but their appointments were vacated that December in the New York Supreme Court. The ruling was made on the basis that the plaintiff had no more than a 2-percent stake in the building.

The building continued to face financial difficulties. When the Marine Midland Bank extended a $3.2 million mortgage on the building in 1934, the tax, water, and amortization fees were in arrears due to missed payments. By the late 1930s, the building was increasingly being referred to as 275 Madison Avenue, though some news media still referred to the building by its 40th Street address. 275 Madison Avenue was sold in March 1943 to a group of businessmen, and Brown Wheelock Harris Stevens Inc. took over the leasing. American Home Products simultaneously leased most of the building's top 23 stories as headquarters offices for the main company and nine subsidiaries. The building's valuation was assessed as $3.05 million at the time. American Home Products had reportedly only been interested in buying 275 Madison Avenue if it were able to occupy 13 floors by May 1, 1943.

=== 1950s to 1970s ===
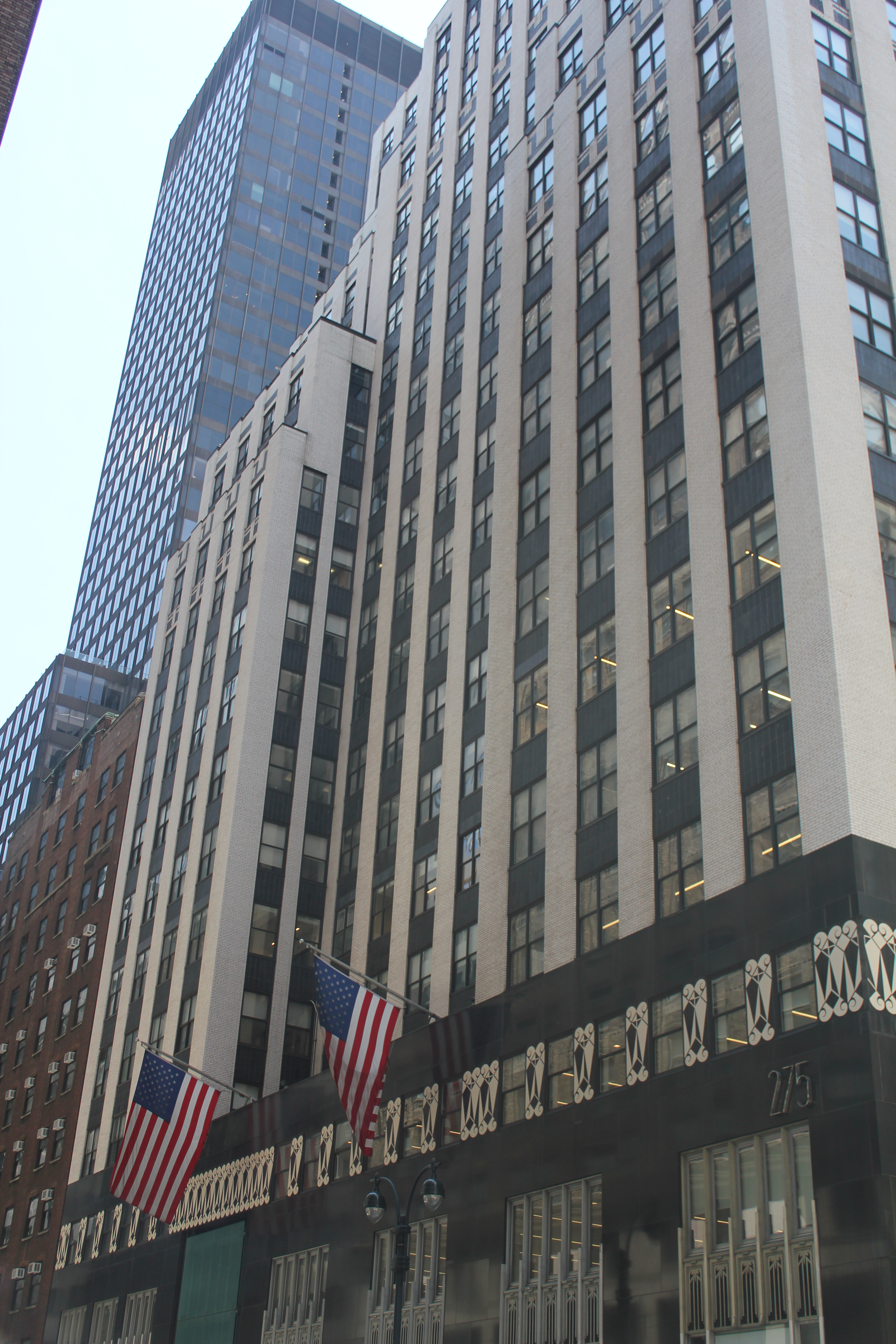
40th Street facade

American Home Products sold the building in November 1951 to Tishman Realty & Construction, which leased back 82,000 square feet (7,600 m^{2}) to American Home Products. The deal reportedly involved more than $5 million, all in cash. At the time, American Home Products occupied 17 full stories and portions of seven others, and New York Trust, Johns-Mansville, Procter & Gamble, Babcock & Wilcox, and Provident Mutual Insurance Company also occupied the building. The sale was finalized in January 1952, and Tishman secured a first mortgage of $3.2 million from the Metropolitan Life Insurance Company. Tishman sold the building in 1953 to the Massachusetts Mutual Life Insurance Company, though Tishman took back a long-term lease. Johns-Manville occupied 110,000 square feet (10,000 m^{2}) on 12 stories, and American Home Products occupied 85,000 square feet (7,900 m^{2}) on 24 stories. The next year, Tishman installed an air-conditioning system in Johns-Manville's offices while 800 employees continued to work in the space. Lawrence Wien and Harry Helmsley took a long-term lease on the building in 1955.

The Equity Corporation began operating 275 Madison Avenue in 1959, the same year that American Home Products leased space for a new headquarters at 685 Third Avenue. American Home Products moved out of the building in 1961, leaving 100,000 square feet (9,300 m^{2}) available for lease, about 45 percent of the entire building. The stories being vacated were relatively small, ranging from 2,000 to 7,000 square feet (190 to 650 m^{2}), so the space was marketed to smaller tenants as cheap offices near Grand Central. Within two years, American Home Products' space was taken by companies in numerous industries. The new lessees included an import/export company, a realty company. an accounting firm, and the Equity Funding Corporation. In 1962, Madison Park Associates acquired the leasehold from the 22 East 40th Street Equity Corporation; both companies were headed by Stanley and Max Stahl. At the time, the Massachusetts Mutual Life Insurance Company owned the structure. Also in the 1960s, Goldman-DiLorenzo bought the land.

Johns-Manville, the building's major tenant, announced in 1971 that it would move its corporate headquarters to a suburb of Denver, Colorado. Goldman-DiLorenzo acquired the lease on the building itself in 1973. Goldman-DiLorenzo acquired a $2.8 million mortgage on the property's leasehold, increasing its leverage. This led to large losses when office spaces in comparable buildings began to rise, and the first mortgage holder, CNA Financial, had begun foreclosure proceedings by 1976. The second mortgage was paid down to $1.8 million, and the second-mortgage holder Gibraltar Financial absorbed much of the losses. The Williams Real Estate Company took over management, at which point the building was 15 percent vacant.

=== 1980s to present ===
Coronet Properties sold the building for $22 million to New Madison-275 Associates, headed by Alain DeBerc, in 1980. The buyer was acting on behalf of foreign syndication firm Gestam Inc., which leased space to ten tenants within months of the purchase. The owner planned to renovate 275 Madison Avenue. At the time, the building's only entrance was on 40th Street, a situation that had existed since the building was constructed. The owners decided to create an expanded lobby and a new entrance within part of the Madison Avenue storefront after the expiration of a lease there. Oppenheimer Brady and Vogelstein designed a $2 million renovation that also included mechanical upgrades and restoration of design features. The new lobby had mirrored wall panels accented with stainless steel, as well as Art Deco chandeliers. Rose marble was imported from the same quarry in France that had provided marble for the original lobby.

The former banking space on Madison Avenue was renovated in 1995, and decorative elements on the facade were also restored. By then, the building's tenants included firms in law, accounting, publishing, cosmetics, public relations, and computer publishing. In 1996, the owners of 275 Madison Avenue and the nearby 370 Lexington Avenue received a combined $27.5 million in loans from the Mutual Life Insurance Company of New York. Two years later, in 1998, Aby Rosen and Michael Fuchs of RFR Realty bought the lease on 275 Madison Avenue for $42 million. The company had an option to buy the underlying land for $19 million but did not execute the option at that time. The base of the building was modified in 2004, when the main entrance was relocated from Madison Avenue to 40th Street. The New York City Landmarks Preservation Commission designated the building as a city landmark on January 13, 2009.

RFR Realty placed the building for sale in April 2016. The RPW Group, headed by Robert Weisz, offered over $270 million for the building less than two months after the sale was announced. That August, the Blackstone Group and SL Green Realty gave RPW a $240 million loan to finance the purchase. Two years later, RPW refinanced the building with a $210 million loan from Ullico. Saadia Group, parent company of Lord & Taylor, leased some space in early 2021.

== See also ==
- Art Deco architecture of New York City
- List of New York City Designated Landmarks in Manhattan from 14th to 59th Streets
