= Katherine Allen Lively =

American writer and musician

Katherine Allen Lively was an American writer and musician. She was best known for her song, "Within the Walls of China" and for her piano performances in Houston, Texas in the early 20th century.

== Biography ==
Lively was born in North Texas and began to play the piano at the age of six.

Lively was well known as a pianist in Houston, according to the Houston Post. She worked for two years as the music editor of the Houston Chronicle and the Houston Post. Lively also served as the music editor for Woman's Viewpoint. She also wrote music, including "Within the Walls of China" for piano. This song was featured in presentations of Broken Blossoms (1919). Lively was inspired to write the song after seeing the photoplay of Broken Blossoms. Lively was also known for her songs, "La Clavel," "Pekita" and "Texas" (1926). She was a charter member of the Thursday Morning Musical Club in Houston.
