= Enco (brand) =

Defunct American gas station brand

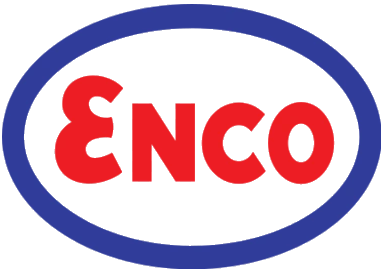
- Product type: Gasoline, lubricants
- Current owner: Standard Oil of New Jersey (via Humble Oil), later Exxon
- Country: United States
- Introduced: 1960; 66 years ago
- Discontinued: 1977; 49 years ago
- Related brands: Esso

Enco was a secondary retail brand name for products of the Humble Oil Corporation (which had been acquired by Standard Oil of New Jersey in 1959) in certain parts of the United States from 1960 to 1977. It was used on service stations operated by Humble in states where they were not permitted to use the Esso brand under conditions set by the court-ordered breakup of Standard Oil in 1911.

After Humble Oil and Standard Oil of NJ rebranded as Exxon in 1973, the brand was eventually discontinued in 1977.

== History ==
=== Beginning ===
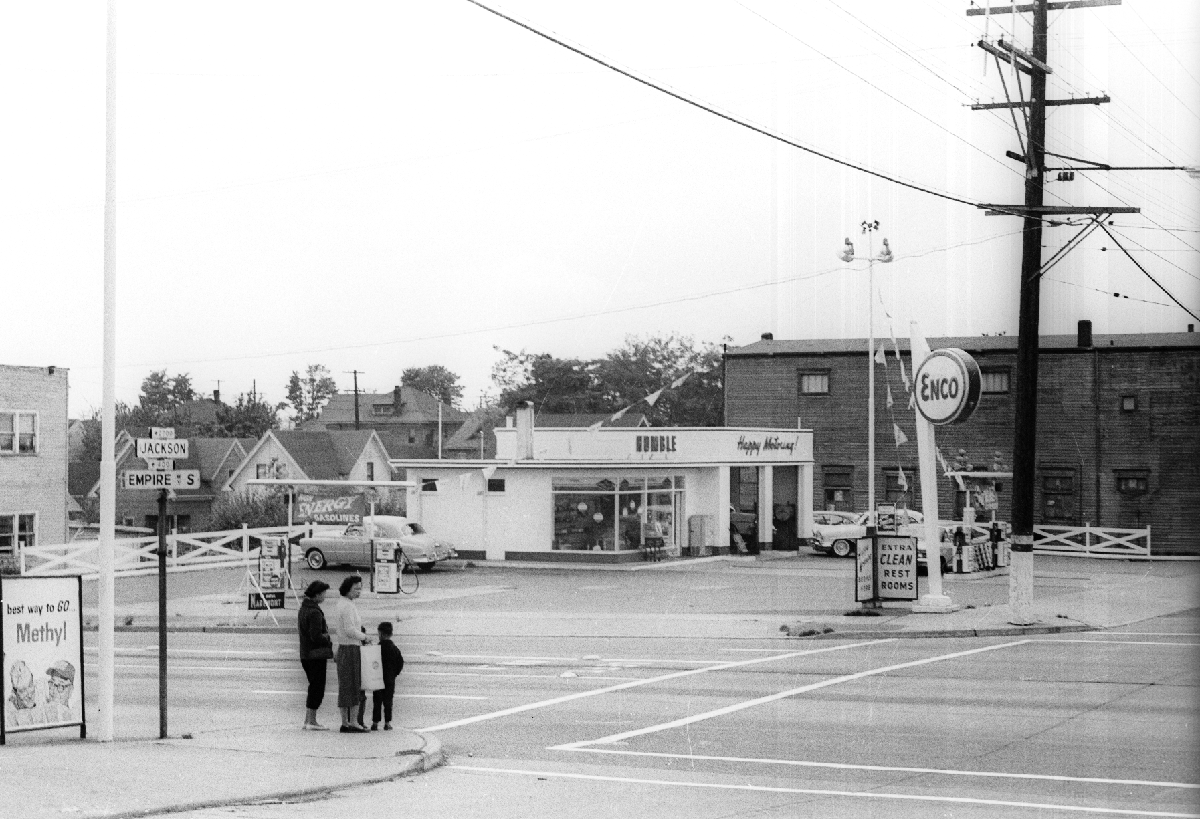
An Enco station in Seattle, 1961

The Enco brand was developed by Humble Oil as an acronymization of Energy Company, taking the EN and CO to make ENCO.

Because Humble Oil was not the first to register "Enco" in all 50 states, it was forced to drop the name in deference to Earl Nunneley Company (also known as "Enco") of Texas.

Founder Earl Nunneley's famous quote on the name dispute was, "It cost Humble more money to change all of their stationery letterheads than it would have if they'd simply bought my firm."

The Enco brand first appeared on gasoline and motor oil products of Jersey Standard affiliates, including Carter Oil in the Northwestern U.S., as well as Pate Oil and Oklahoma Oil in the Midwest during the summer and fall of 1960, shortly after the parent company reorganized all its domestic marketing and refining operations to former Texas-based subsidiary Humble Oil and Refining Company. In 1961, the Enco brand was introduced at Humble stations in Oklahoma, New Mexico and Arizona – both for the stations and gasoline/oil products, as was the case in California and some other western states where Humble opened stations for the first time. The Enco brand was also rolled out for gasoline/oil products at Humble's Texas stations, which retained Humble as the station brand until that was converted to Enco in 1962. However, one state, Ohio, used "Humble" because Standard Oil of Ohio (Sohio) refused to allow use of the Enco name. "Esso", the phonetic spelling for the abbreviation "S.O." for "Standard Oil", was a brand name of Standard Oil of New Jersey.

From 1961 to 1972, Enco advertising and promotional efforts were the same as Esso's in the eastern U.S. including the use of the Humble name in advertisements along with the "Happy Motoring!" tagline used by Esso for decades, and the "Put A Tiger In Your Tank" ad campaign introduced nationwide in 1964. Logotypes for Enco and Esso were identical ovals with blue outer edge and red lettering with white background.

=== Discontinuation ===
Despite Humble's attempts to tie Enco and Esso brands together as a nationwide gasoline marketer during the 1960s, the company was not wholly successful at competing with truly national brands such as Texaco which was then the only oil company selling its gasoline under the same brand name in all 50 states, and Shell, as Humble's strongest markets remained the Esso territory in the eastern U.S. and the former Humble home territory in Texas. Despite these challenges, Humble was the most successful of several U.S. oil companies to expand marketing and refining operations to California and West Coast states as most other "newcomers" entering that region during the 1950s and 1960s such as Gulf Oil, Phillips 66, Amoco, Conoco and others enjoyed less than stellar results, and each would pull out of California and surrounding states during the 1970s.

In 1967, Humble further expanded its California presence when it purchased a large number of service stations from Signal Oil (a Chevron subsidiary) and converted them to the Enco brand, which joined a large number of stations Humble had already built from scratch or bought from other oil companies. That was followed by the construction and opening of an oil refinery in 1969. Humble also expanded the Enco brand to Alabama, Florida, Georgia, Kentucky, and Mississippi after the Supreme Court ruled that Humble's use of the Esso trademark in those states violated Standard Oil of Kentucky's use of the name "Standard Oil". Kentucky Standard was almost completely dependent upon Esso for its products from 1911 until 1961, when it became a part of Standard Oil of California, now Chevron.

As early as 1966, Humble realized that it needed a single brand name it could use nationwide but faced a dilemma as Esso could not be used in other Standard Oil territories and Enco had a Japanese translation as "stalled car." In late 1971, Humble rolled out the Exxon brand name at rebranded Enco and Esso in several test markets throughout the U.S. Following successful results of the Exxon brand in those areas, Humble/Jersey Standard officials in May 1972 announced that Exxon would become the company's sole gasoline brand in the U.S. later that year – replacing both Esso and Enco at service stations and on gasoline, motor oil and lubricant products nationwide (Esso was retained outside the U.S. where Standard Oil stipulations by the U.S. Justice Department did not apply). Also, the corporate name Standard Oil of New Jersey was changed to Exxon Corporation, the U.S. refining/marketing division, Humble Oil and Refining Co., was renamed Exxon USA, and the Enjay Chemicals division would be renamed Exxon Chemicals.

While the Enco brand largely disappeared after 1973, the name survived in the Midwest (an area controlled by Amoco, which unlike Ohio, didn't object to Enco) until 1977, since the Midwest was one of Humble's weaker markets. Exxon sold the last remaining Enco stations to Cheker Oil Co. in 1977 as part of its withdrawal from the Midwest outside Southern Ohio, retiring the Enco brand permanently. Cheker was later acquired by Marathon Petroleum subsidiary Speedway. In 2021, 7-Eleven acquired Speedway. Although Marathon will continue to supply fuel at Speedway locations, as 7-Eleven partners with Exxon at some locations, the deal brought the legacy Enco sites in the Midwest full circle.
