= Florence M. Sterling =

American businesswoman and journalist (1871–1940)

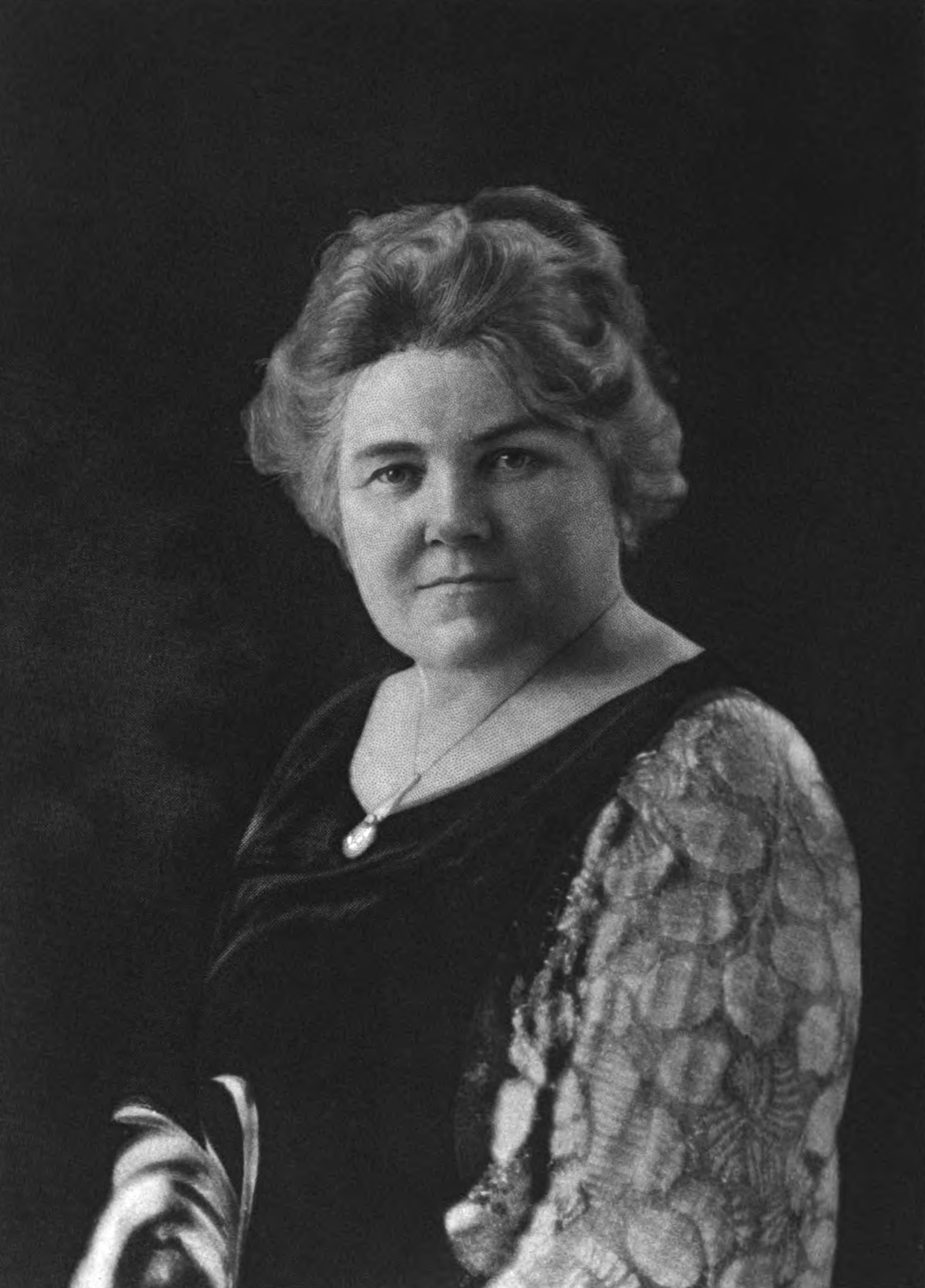
- Born: October 13, 1871; Anahuac, Texas
- Died: March 24, 1940 (aged 68); Houston, Texas
- Occupations: Businesswoman, Journalist

Florence M. Sterling (October 13, 1871 – March 24, 1940) was an American businesswoman, journalist and early feminist. Sterling served as treasurer and secretary of her family's business venture, Humble Oil, and also for various community services in Houston. She was the founder of the Woman's Viewpoint.

== Biography ==
Sterling was born in Anahuac, Texas. Daughter of Benjamin Franklin and Mary (Bryan) Sterling, she was one of twelve children. As a young woman, she worked with her brothers in her father's store.

She worked for the R.S. Sterling and Company as a bookkeeper and as secretary and treasurer in 1913. At the same time, Sterling became the assistant and then later, full treasurer and secretary of the Humble Oil Company. She signed checks for the business as "F.M.Sterling," hiding her gender. She also was the secretary and treasurer of the Sterling Investment Company. During World War I, she was a member of the executive board of the Houston Red Cross. She also worked as treasurer of the Houston War Camp Community Service. She never married, devoting herself to various causes all her life.

Sterling was active in women's rights in Texas. She was elected the second vice-president of the Texas branch of the National Woman's Party in 1916. She was involved with the Texas branch of the congressional union for woman's suffrage. Sterling founded the Woman's Viewpoint in 1923. She felt that the world needed to see things through the eyes of women. The magazine was edited and written entirely by women and ran until 1927. Sterling served as president of the League of Women Voters in Houston from 1923 to 1925. In the late 1920s, Sterling shared her home with Oveta Culp Hobby. They had been friends for several years.

Sterling died in Houston on March 24, 1940, and was buried in Glenwood Cemetery.
