= Kenneth Franzheim =

American architect

Kenneth Franzheim (October 28, 1890 – March 13, 1959) was an American architect. His early work was in Chicago and Boston with C. Howard Crane. Starting in 1928, most of his work was in Houston, to where he moved his practice in 1937.

== Early life ==
Kenneth Franzheim was born in Wheeling, West Virginia on October 28, 1890. His parents were Charles W. Franzheim and Lida Riddle Merts Franzheim. He earned a bachelor's degree at the Massachusetts Institute of Technology in 1913.

== Career ==
Upon graduation from the Massachusetts Institute of Technology, Franzheim was employed by the Boston architect, for whom he worked until 1917. He served the United States Army Air Corps during World War I at Ellington Field, in the Houston area. After the war, he practiced with the Detroit architect, C. Howard Crane in Chicago and Boston. He started his own practice in New York in 1925. His career was boosted by Houston banker and developer, Jesse H. Jones in 1928. Collaborating with Houston architect Alfred C. Finn, Franzheim designed the temporary building for the 1928 Democratic National Convention and the Houston in Houston.

Franzheim became a major commercial architect in mid-century Houston after moving his offices to the city in 1937. Franzheim was one of the architects involved designing Humble Tower, the Prudential Building (Houston), Texas National Bank building (Houston) and Bank of the Southwest (Houston) building. His best-known building was the Foley’s Department Store downtown location (demolished). It had six floors before it was expanded to nine in 1957, and included windowless retail space suspended at street level above a first-floor window-wall and canopy with a streamlined interior by famed industrial designer Raymond Loewy. In 1950 the building received an Award of Merit from the AIA. Franzheim also designed 275 Madison Avenue and several other buildings in New York City.

John Zemanek and Eugene Werlin worked at the firm early in their careers. There are plans to add oral interviews with both Zemanek and Werlin in which they discuss Franzheim’s influence to the digital library at the University of Houston.

== Personal life ==
Franzheim married Elizabeth Frances Simms on May 12, 1919. They had three children, including Kenneth Franzheim II, later a diplomat under President Richard Nixon.

== Death and legacy ==
Franzheim died of a heart attack on March 13, 1959 at the age of 68.

One of Franzheim's most enduring legacies is the development of Fairlington in Arlington, VA. Franzheim was the primary architect of this WW2-era housing development a few miles south of the Pentagon, which is today a high-end, private housing development.

== Works ==
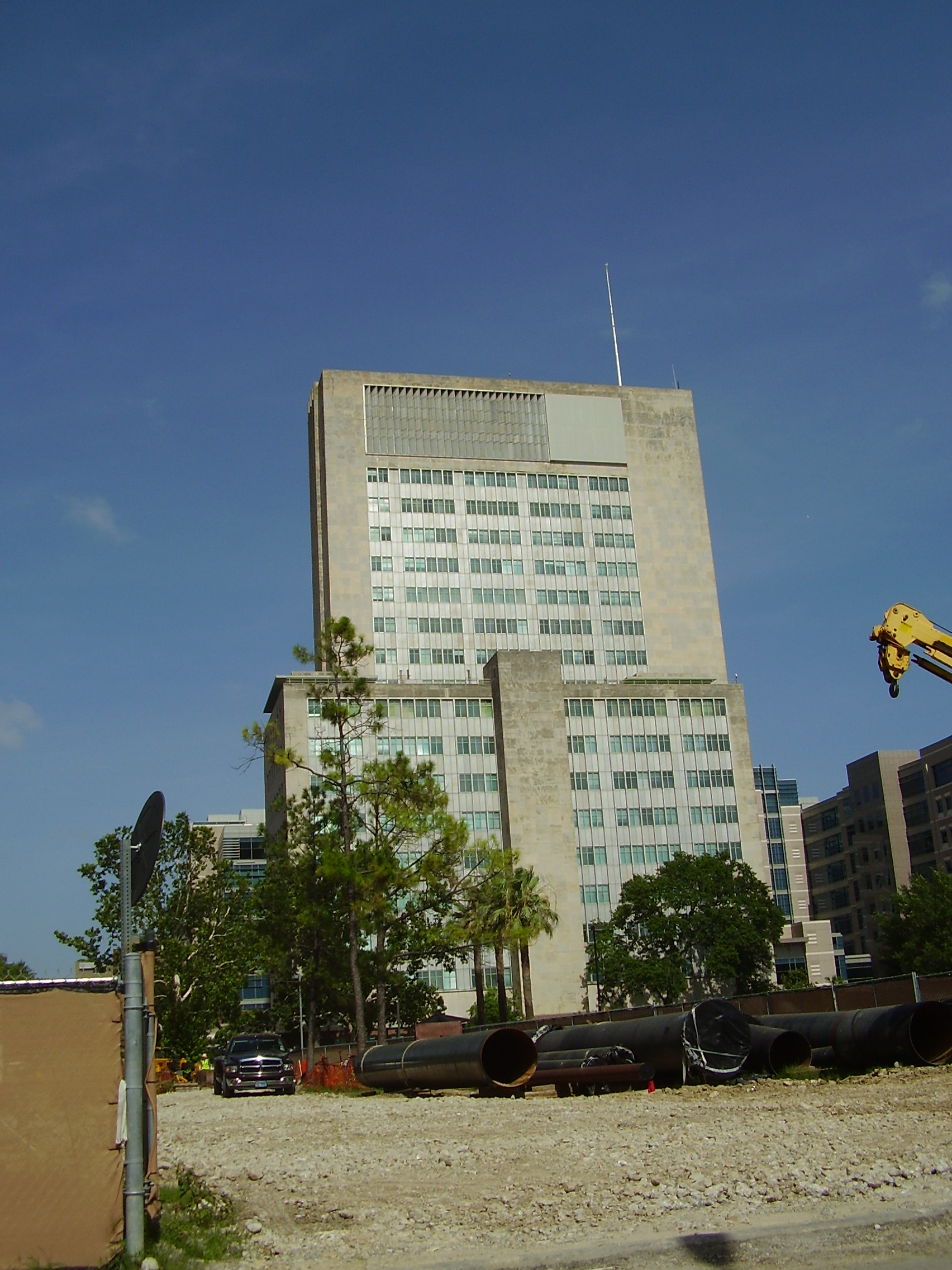
Houston Main Building

The Houston Main Building (HMB) formerly the Prudential Building, was a skyscraper in the Texas Medical Center, Houston, Texas. It originally housed offices of the Prudential Insurance Company, before becoming a part of the MD Anderson Cancer Center. The building was demolished on January 8, 2012.

- 1928 Democratic Convention Center, Houston (1928) – with Alfred C. Finn, demolished
- Gulf Building, Houston (1929) – with Alfred C. Finn
- Humble Tower, Houston (1936) – with John Staub
- Hermann Hospital and Professional Building, Houston (1949) – with Hedrick and Lindsley
- Prudential Building, Houston (1952)

== Bibliography ==
- Bradley, Barrie Scardino (2020). Improbable Metropolis: Houston's Architectural and Urban History. Austin: University of Texas Press. ISBN 978-1-4773-2019-8.
