= Humble Oil =

Defunct American oil company

Humble Oil & Refining Co.
- Company type: Private (1911–59); Subsidiary (1959–73)
- Industry: Petroleum
- Founded: 1911
- Founder: Walter Fondren Sr.; Ross Sterling; Frank Sterling
- Defunct: January 1, 1973
- Fate: Acquired by Exxon
- Successor: Exxon Company, U.S.A.
- Headquarters: Humble Oil Building (1921–1963); Humble Building (1963–1973), Houston, Texas
- Products: Gasoline, motor oils
- Brands: Esso (1960–73); Enco (1960–73)
- Parent: Standard Oil of New Jersey (1959–73)

Humble Oil and Refining Co. was an American oil company founded in 1911 in Humble, Texas. In 1919, a 50% interest in Humble was acquired by the Standard Oil of New Jersey which acquired the rest of the company in September 1959. The Humble brand was used by Standard Oil of New Jersey until 1973, when the company rebranded nationwide as Exxon and discontinued Humble, along with its other brands Esso (Note: Esso is no longer used commercially in the United States, but remains a brand of ExxonMobil used outside of the United States, particularly Canada, Hong Kong and the United Kingdom) and Enco.

Today, Humble's assets are owned and operated by ExxonMobil, which formed from the merger of Exxon and Mobil (Standard Oil of New York) in 1999.

== History ==
The Humble Oil Company was chartered by Walter Fondren Sr., and brothers Ross Sterling and Frank Sterling, in February 1911. They were joined by their sister, Florence M. Sterling, who became assistant, and later full, secretary and treasurer of the company. The three siblings were often referred to as the "Trio."

On June 21, 1917, the company was re-organized as Humble Oil and Refining Company and incorporated with a capitalization of $1 million. William Stamps Farish II (1881–1942), was the primary organizer. Farish served as vice president for five years and, in 1922, he became the president of Humble Oil and Refining Co. In 1933, he became chairman of the board of Standard Oil Company of New Jersey (later Exxon Company), which held substantial stock interest in Humble, and in 1937, he became president of Standard.

=== National expansion, introduction of Enco brand ===
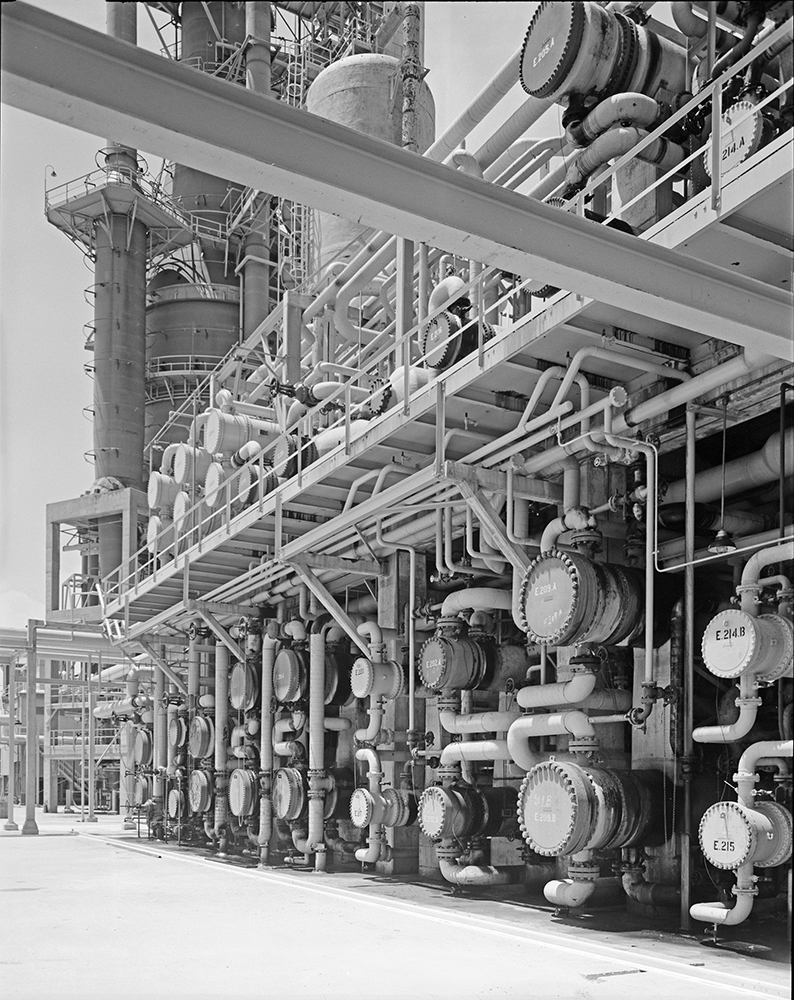
Humble Oil refinery in Baytown, Texas, 1958

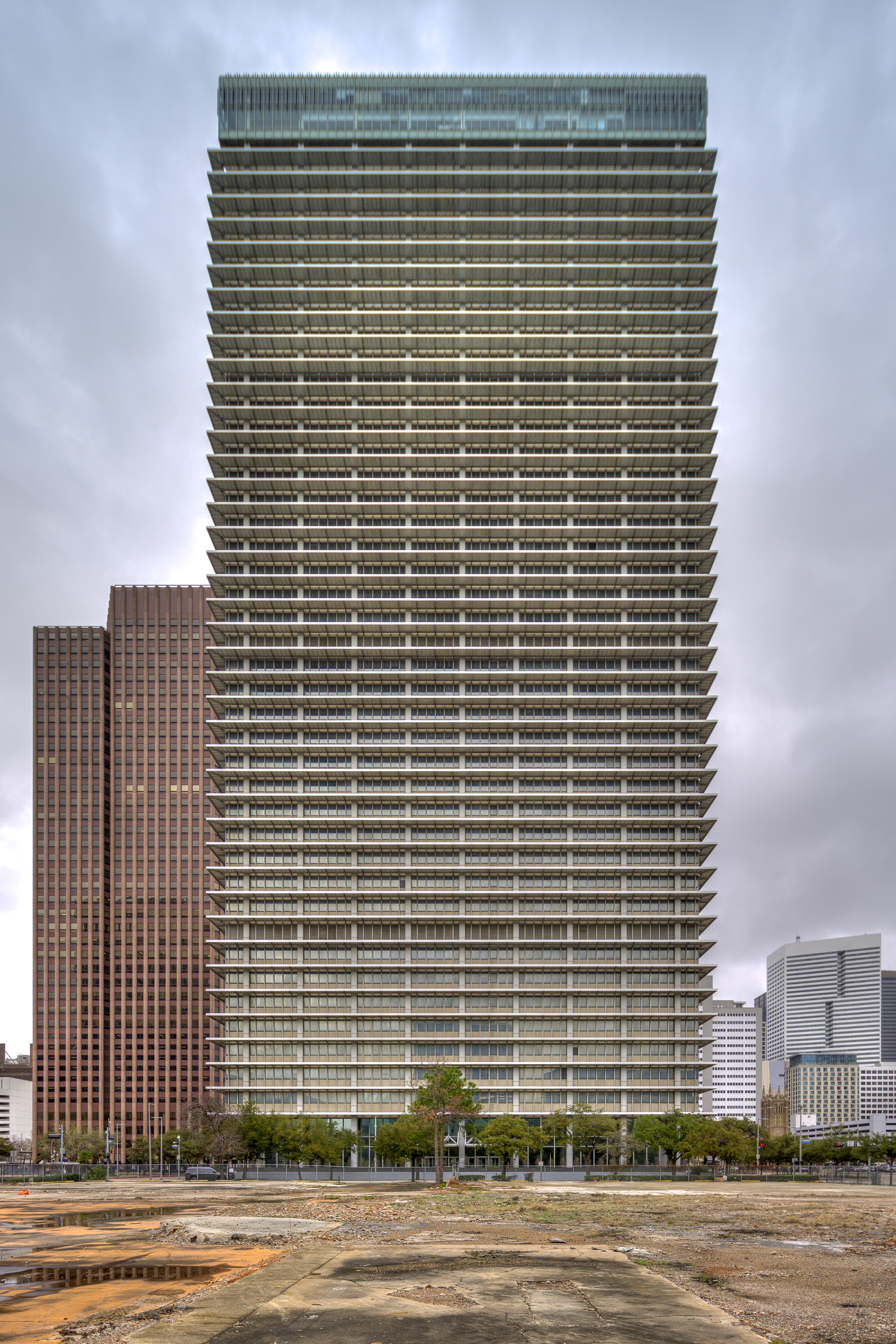
Houston Headquarters, built 1963

Humble's restructuring allowed both companies to sell and market gasoline nationwide under the Esso, Enco and Humble brands. The Enco brand was introduced by Humble in the summer of 1960 at stations in Ohio, but was soon blackballed after Standard Oil of Ohio (Sohio) protested that Enco (Humble's acronym for "ENergy COmpany") sounded and looked too much like Esso as it shared the same oval logo with blue border and red letters with the two middle letters the only difference. At that point, the stations in Ohio were rebranded Humble (but the gasoline, motor oil, and lubricant products kept the name Enco) until the name change to Exxon in 1972.

Humble Oil also had service/gas stations branded as "Carter" in Colorado. They were changed to ENCO in the early 60's. Though the Enco brand was discontinued in Ohio, it was rolled out in other non-Esso states, including service stations in the Midwestern U.S. operated by Jersey affiliate Pate Oil and in the Pacific Northwest by affiliate Carter Oil. The Humble brand was used at Texas stations for decades as those operations were under the direction of Jersey Standard affiliate, Humble Oil, and in the mid-to-late 1950s, Humble expanded to other Southwestern states including New Mexico, Arizona, and Oklahoma. In the spring of 1961, Humble stations in Oklahoma, New Mexico, and Arizona were rebranded as Enco, and the Enco brand appeared on gasoline and lubricant products at Humble stations in Texas that same year, although service stations in the Lone Star State were not changed to Enco until 1962. During that time, Humble also expanded the Enco brand to new marketing areas it entered for the first time, including the West Coast.

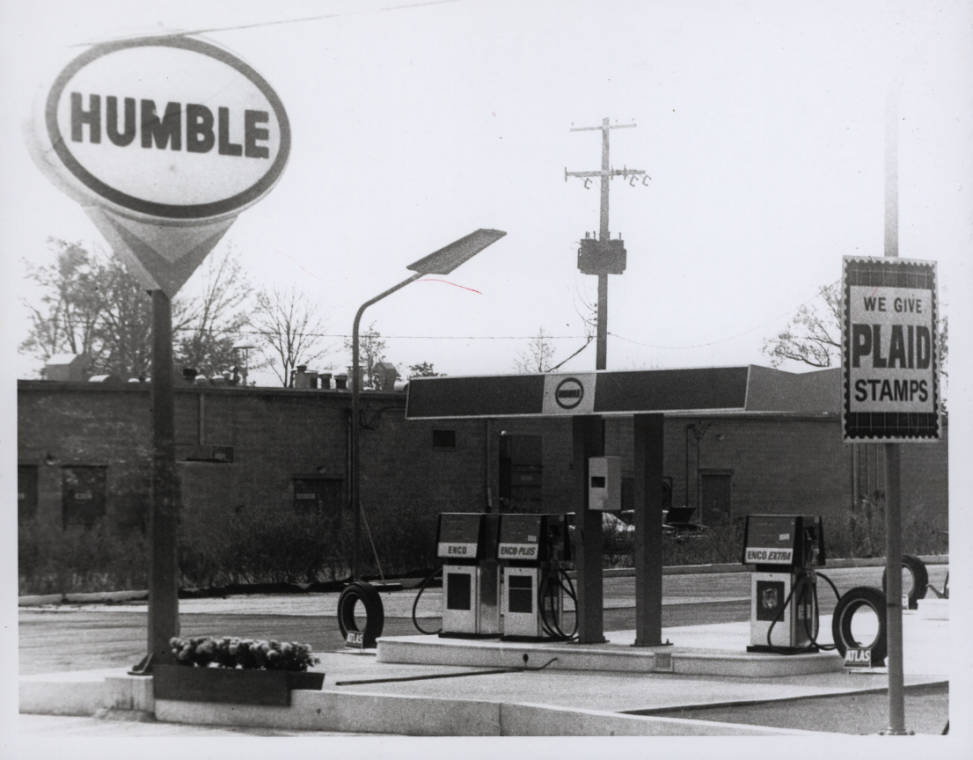
Humble-branded forecourt located in Gahanna, Ohio (early 1970's). The Enco brand was not used in Ohio because of trademark infringement claims made by Standard Oil Co. of Ohio (Sohio); Exxon later withdrew from Ohio entirely by the end of the decade save for Southeast Ohio and Columbus

In 1963, Humble was approached by Tidewater Oil Company, a major gasoline marketer along the eastern and western seaboards, to purchase Tidewater's refining and marketing operations on the west coast, a move that would have given Humble a large number of existing stations and a refinery in California, which was then the fastest-growing gasoline market. However, the U.S. Justice Department objected to Humble's plan and Tidewater's west coast operations were sold to Phillips Petroleum in 1966. Meanwhile, Humble gradually built up new and rebranded service stations in California and other western states under the Enco brand and purchased a large number of stations from Signal Oil Company in 1967, followed by the opening of a new refinery in Benicia, California, in 1969.

In 1966, the Justice Department ordered Humble to "cease and desist" from using the Esso brand at stations in several Southeastern states following protests from Standard Oil of Kentucky (a Standard Oil of California subsidiary by that time and in the process of rebranding the Kyso stations as Chevron). By 1967, stations in each of those states were rebranded as Enco.

=== Discontinuation of the Humble, Enco brands in favor of Exxon ===
Despite the success of the "Put A Tiger In Your Tank" advertising campaign introduced by Humble in 1959, to promote its Enco/Esso Extra gasolines, the similar oval logotypes, the Happy Motoring! tagline used in advertisements that also appeared overhead of service bays at each station, use of the Humble name in all Esso/Enco ads and the uniformity in design and products of Humble stations nationwide, the company still had difficulties promoting itself as a nationwide gasoline marketer competing against truly national brands such as Texaco — then a 50-state marketer and the only company selling products under one brand name in each state. Humble officials realized that, by the late 1960s, the time had come to swallow its pride by developing a new brand name that could be used nationwide throughout the U.S. At first, consideration was given to simply rebranding all stations as "Enco", but that was shelved when it was learned that "Enco" means "stalled car" in Japanese.

To create a unified brand, the company rebranded all its U.S. service stations, along with its gasoline and other petroleum products, from Esso and Enco (Humble in Ohio) to Exxon nationwide during the summer and fall of 1972, following the successful test marketing of the Exxon brand and logo in late 1971 and early 1972 at rebranded Enco/Esso stations in certain U.S. cities. The name change, one of the most expensive in the history of the U.S. oil industry, not only involved advertisements and identifying street signs at service stations, but also gasoline pumps, product packaging, tankers, transport and delivery trucks, hundreds of smaller signs at more than 25,000 service stations, and millions of credit cards sent to account holders to replace their previous Esso/Enco cards.

The corporate name change from Standard Oil of New Jersey to Exxon Corporation took effect January 1, 1973, along with the name change of domestic refining/marketing division Humble Oil and Refining Co. to Exxon USA, and the mergers of Esso Chemicals and Enjay Chemicals into Exxon Chemicals.

== Early research into global warming ==
In 1957, scientists from Humble Oil published a study tracking “the enormous quantity of carbon dioxide” contributed to the atmosphere since the Industrial Revolution “from the combustion of fossil fuels.” Exxon was aware of these findings and later researched the effect of its own company on global warming.

== Monterey County (CA) expansion ==
In 1965 Humble had intended to kickstart a massive 60-square-mile development plan for the Moss Landing area that would have significantly impacted the area's natural beauty and altered its economic development. The company wanted to build a 50,000-barrel-a-day refinery with plans to expand to 150,000-200,000 barrels-a-day on a 444-acre site on the wetlands near Moss Landing at the Elkhorn Slough. Monterey County was deeply divided on the plan with tourism proponents, some agricultural interests and a nascent environmental movement opposing the refinery. However, public opinion surveys showed greater than 2 to 1 support for the Humble Oil refinery with Warren Church supervisorial district in favor with 82%. The board of supervisors, after a 17-hour marathon public meeting, voted 3–2 to back the plan, with Church in favor of it because his district overwhelmingly backed the plan. But Church and others added many tough restrictions to the project a few weeks later at a 12-hour meeting that set the conditions for the permit. "It is not just the Humble Oil refinery we are fighting at Moss Landing," said Carmel Highlands photographer Ansel Adams prior to the decision. "It is the whole industrial complex which will inevitability follow and change the whole complexion of this Monterey County."

The Humble project was approved, but the planning commission (which had previously rejected the project by a 5–4 vote) had imposed 36 conditions many that had never been imposed on an industry before. Church added three more which included for parking, sulfur recovery and carbon monoxide emissions. As a part of the imposed conditions on the approval for Humble Oil, Church asked that three air-pollution stations be set up in Monterey County to monitor air quality for two-years prior to Humble starting to build. Church said that the county needed to do so in order to "obtain 'guidelines' to determine what pollutants an oil refinery may contribute." Church's intentions were that Humble be required to pay for and maintain the stations. The Salinas Californian stated, “It is conceivable in the future that other areas debating the admittance of an oil refinery will look at Monterey County as an example of strict regulations. The conditions are that unique.” One of the most restrictive conditions forbade Humble Oil from expanding significantly without getting a new permit.

By the spring of 1966, Humble Oil was expressing the need for a larger refinery than initially permitted. Church publicly declared that there was not a majority on the board of supervisors for a larger refinery. Although not identifying himself as the supervisor switching his position on Humble, it is widely accepted that it was Church who refused to back a larger refinery unless Humble could “prove” that a smaller one would comply with the county's restrictions. On May 18, 1966, Humble Oil announced a suspension of all activities at Moss Landing, publicly stating that a prime reason for abandoning the site was the difficulty of achieving a permit for a larger refinery. Public outcry and a legal challenge plus engineering problems also discouraged Humble Oil, and they eventually pulled out of Monterey County and decided to build a bigger refinery up north in more-welcoming Benicia.

== Leadership ==
=== President ===
1. Ross S. Sterling, 1917–1922
2. William S. Farish II, 1922–1933
3. Robert L. Blaffer, 1933–1937
4. Harry C. Wiess, 1937–1948
5. Hines H. Baker Sr, 1948–1957
6. Morgan J. Davis, 1957–1961
7. Carl E. Reistle Jr, 1961–1963
8. J. Kenneth Jamieson, 1963–1964
9. Charles F. Jones, 1964–1970
10. Thomas D. Barrow, 1970–1973

=== Chairman of the Board ===
1. Ross S. Sterling, 1922–1925
2. Robert L. Blaffer, 1937–1941
3. Harry C. Wiess, 1948
4. Leonidas T. Barrow, 1948–1955
5. J. A. Neath, 1955–1957
6. Morgan J. Davis, 1961–1963
7. Carl E. Reistle Jr, 1963–1966
8. Myron A. Wright, 1966–1973
