= Woman's Viewpoint (magazine) =

- Frequency: weekly, semi monthly, monthly
- Founder: 1923
- First issue: December 1923
- Final issue: 1927
- Country: United States
- Based in: Texas

The Woman's Viewpoint was a woman's magazine founded in Texas in 1923 and published by Florence M. Sterling. The magazine was progressive and ran from 1923 to 1927.

== History ==
Sterling founded the Woman's Viewpoint in Houston, and was the owner. She quit her position at the Humble Oil Company in order to devote herself to the magazine full-time. The Woman's Viewpoint had an all-female staff and began publication as a weekly serial in December 1923. The editorial staff members included Ola Harris Beaubien, Katherine Allen Lively and Mrs. Eric Tarrant Davis.

Regular columns and features of the magazine were meant to be of interest to women and included advice on caring for children, fashion, a shopping guide, health and beauty advice and entertainment columns. Other articles were political in nature and encouraged women to vote. It was important to Sterling that women had a voice, saying, "No man on earth can give a woman's viewpoint." Dorothy Scarborough's autobiographical novel, The Unfair Sex, was published as a serial in the Woman's Viewpoint. Grace Coolidge, then First Lady of the United States, also contributed an article in 1925.

The magazine later became published semi-monthly and then monthly, with an increase of pages from 22 to 90. Sterling moved the magazine to Albany in March 1926.
