= Women's Viewpoint (TV programme) =

1951 British TV discussion series

Women's Viewpoint is a British discussion television programme which aired on BBC during 1951. The programme focused on the discussion of issues by women. It is unlikely any of the episodes still exist, given that the BBC rarely telerecorded shows prior to 1953.

== Episodes ==
- "Is There a Women's Viewpoint?" (3 April 1951)
- "Women in Politics" (17 April 1951)
- "The Education of Girls (1 May 1951)
- "Women's Magazines" (29 May 1951)
- "The Home and the State" (11 June 1951)
