= Buffalo Bill (1944 film) =

1944 film by William A. Wellman

- Directed by: William A. Wellman
- Screenplay by: Aeneas MacKenzie; Clements Ripley; Cecile Kramer; John Larkin (contributing writer; uncredited)
- Story by: Frank Winch
- Produced by: Harry Sherman; Darryl F. Zanuck (executive producer; uncredited)
- Starring: Joel McCrea; Maureen O'Hara; Linda Darnell; Thomas Mitchell
- Cinematography: Leon Shamroy
- Edited by: James B. Clark
- Music by: David Buttolph
- Color process: Technicolor
- Production company: 20th Century Fox
- Distributed by: 20th Century Fox
- Release date: April 1944
- Running time: 90 minutes
- Country: United States
- Language: English
- Box office: $2 million

Buffalo Bill is a 1944 American Western film about the life of the frontiersman Buffalo Bill Cody, directed by William A. Wellman and starring Joel McCrea and Maureen O'Hara with Linda Darnell, Thomas Mitchell (as Ned Buntline), Edgar Buchanan and Anthony Quinn in supporting roles.

== Plot ==
A fictionalized account of the life of William F. "Buffalo Bill" Cody, a hunter and Army Scout who rescues a US Senator and his beautiful daughter, Louisa Frederici; Frederici eventually becomes his devoted wife. Cody is portrayed as someone who admires and respects the Indians. He is a good friend of Yellow Hand, who will eventually become Chief of the Cheyenne. Public opinion is against the Indians, and military leaders, politicians and businessmen are prepared to take their lands and destroy their hunting grounds for their own profit. Cody is eventually forced to fight the Cheyenne on their behalf. He meets a writer, Ned Buntline, whose accounts of Cody's exploits make him a sensation in the eastern United States and Europe. He establishes a wild west show that becomes an international sensation. His career as a performer is threatened when he takes a stand against the mistreatment of the Native American population.

== Cast ==
- Joel McCrea as Buffalo Bill Cody
- Maureen O'Hara as Louisa Frederici
- Linda Darnell as Dawn Starlight
- Thomas Mitchell as Ned Buntline
- Edgar Buchanan as Sergeant Chips McGraw
- Anthony Quinn as Chief Yellow Hand
- Moroni Olsen as Senator Frederici
- Frank Fenton as Murdo Carvell
- Matt Briggs as General Blazier
- George Lessey as Schyler Vandervere
- Frank Orth as Sherman - Shooting Gallery Owner
- Arthur Aylesworth as Pool Player (uncredited)
- Evelyn Beresford as Queen Victoria (uncredited)
- Sidney Blackmer as Theodore Roosevelt (uncredited)
- John Dilson as President Rutherford B. Hayes (uncredited)
- Robert Homans as Policeman Muldoon (uncredited)
- Chief Many Treaties as Chief Tall Bull (uncredited)
- Chief Thundercloud as Crazy Horse (uncredited)

== Production ==
Parts of the film were shot in Johnson Canyon and Paria, Utah.

== See also ==
- List of American films of 1944
