= Buffalo Bill =

American soldier and showman (1846–1917)

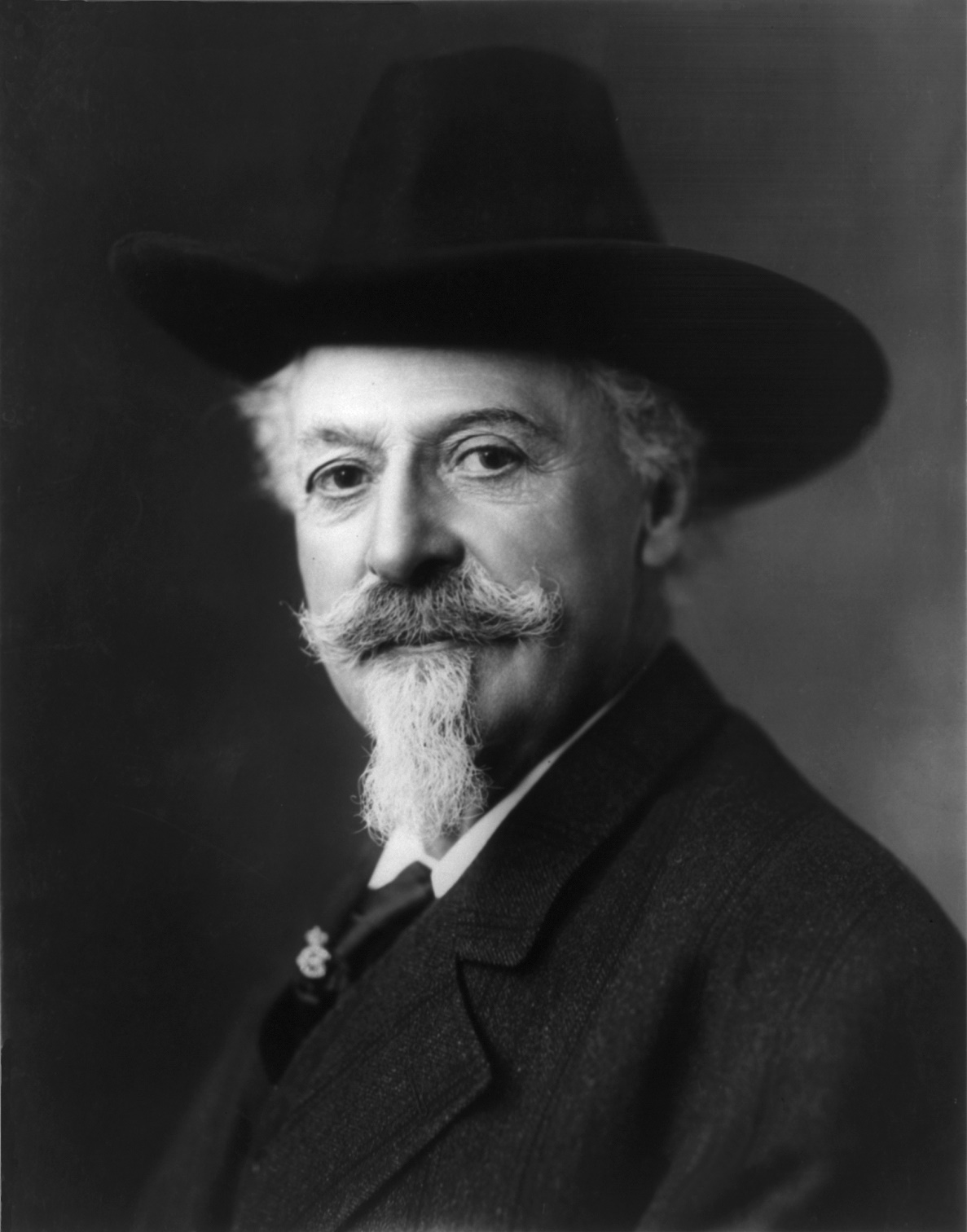
- Buffalo Bill in 1911
- Born: William Frederick Cody; February 26, 1846; Le Claire, Iowa Territory, U.S.
- Died: January 10, 1917 (aged 70); Denver, Colorado, U.S.
- Resting place: Lookout Mountain, Colorado; 39°43′57″N 105°14′17″W
- Other name: Pahaska (Long hair)
- Occupations: Army scout, Pony Express rider, ranch hand, wagon train driver, town developer, railroad contractor, bison hunter, fur trapper, gold prospector, showman
- Known for: Buffalo Bill's Wild West shows
- Spouse: Louisa Frederici (m. 1866)
- Children: 4
- Military career
- Allegiance: United States
- Branch: United States Army
- Service years: 1863–1865; 1868–1872
- Rank: Private; Chief of Scouts
- Unit: 7th Kansas Cavalry Regiment
- Conflicts: American Civil War; American Indian Wars
- Awards: Medal of Honor

William Frederick Cody (February 26, 1846 – January 10, 1917), better known as Buffalo Bill, was an American soldier, bison hunter, and showman. One of the most famous figures of the American Old West, Cody began performing at the age of 23. He performed in shows that displayed cowboy themes and episodes from the frontier and Indian Wars. He founded Buffalo Bill's Wild West in 1883, taking his large company on tours in the United States and, beginning in 1887, in Europe.

He was born in Le Claire, Iowa Territory (now the U.S. state of Iowa), but he lived for several years in his father's hometown in modern-day Mississauga, Ontario, before the family returned to the Midwest and settled in the Kansas Territory. Buffalo Bill started working at the age of 11, after his father's death, and became a rider for the Pony Express at age 15. During the American Civil War, he served the Union from 1863 to the end of the war in 1865. Later he served as a civilian scout for the U.S. Army during the Indian Wars. While he was initially awarded the Medal of Honor in 1872 for his actions in the Indian Wars, he was among 911 recipients to have the award rescinded in 1917. Congress reinstated the medals for Cody and four other civilian scouts in 1989.

== Early life and education ==
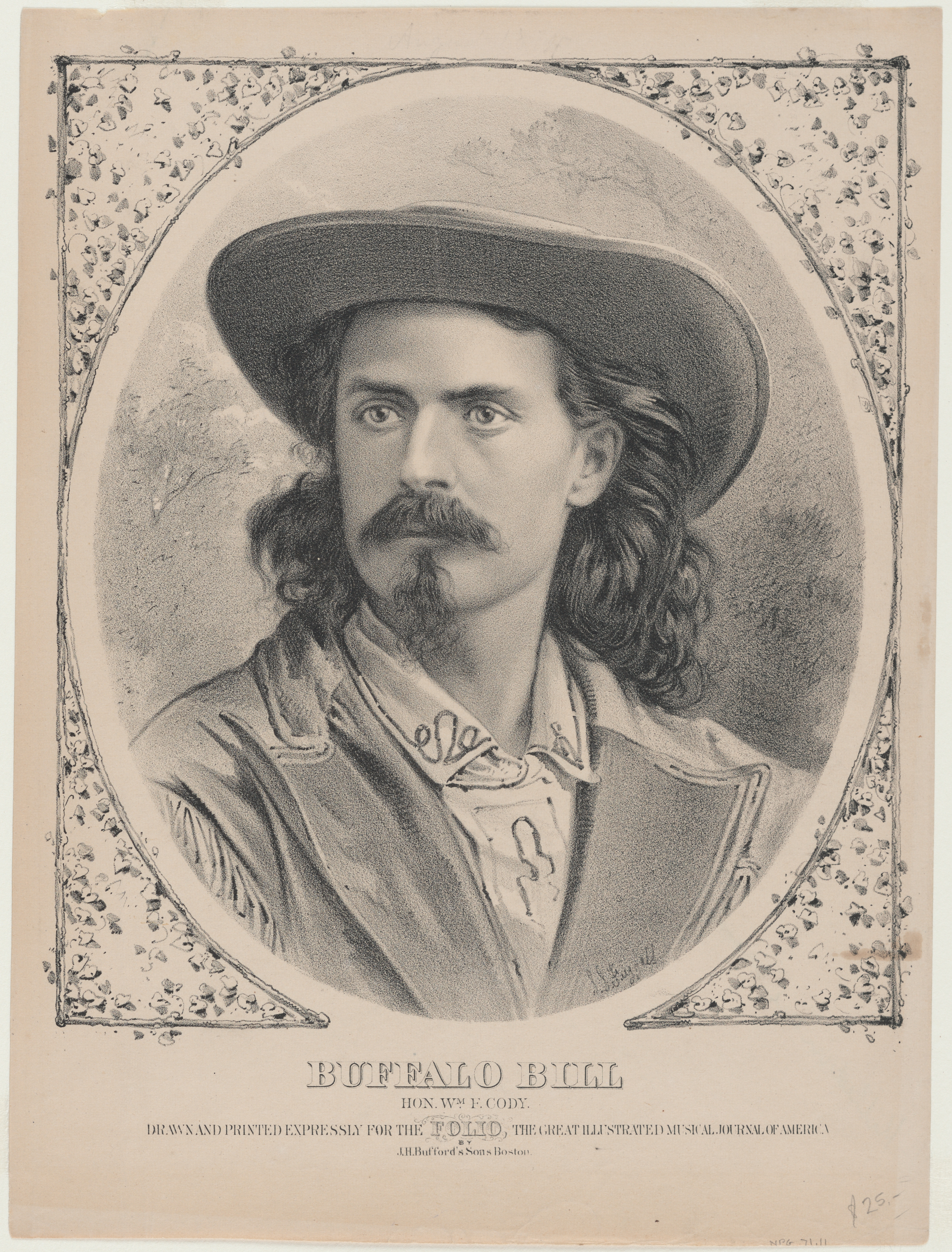
A portrait of Cody

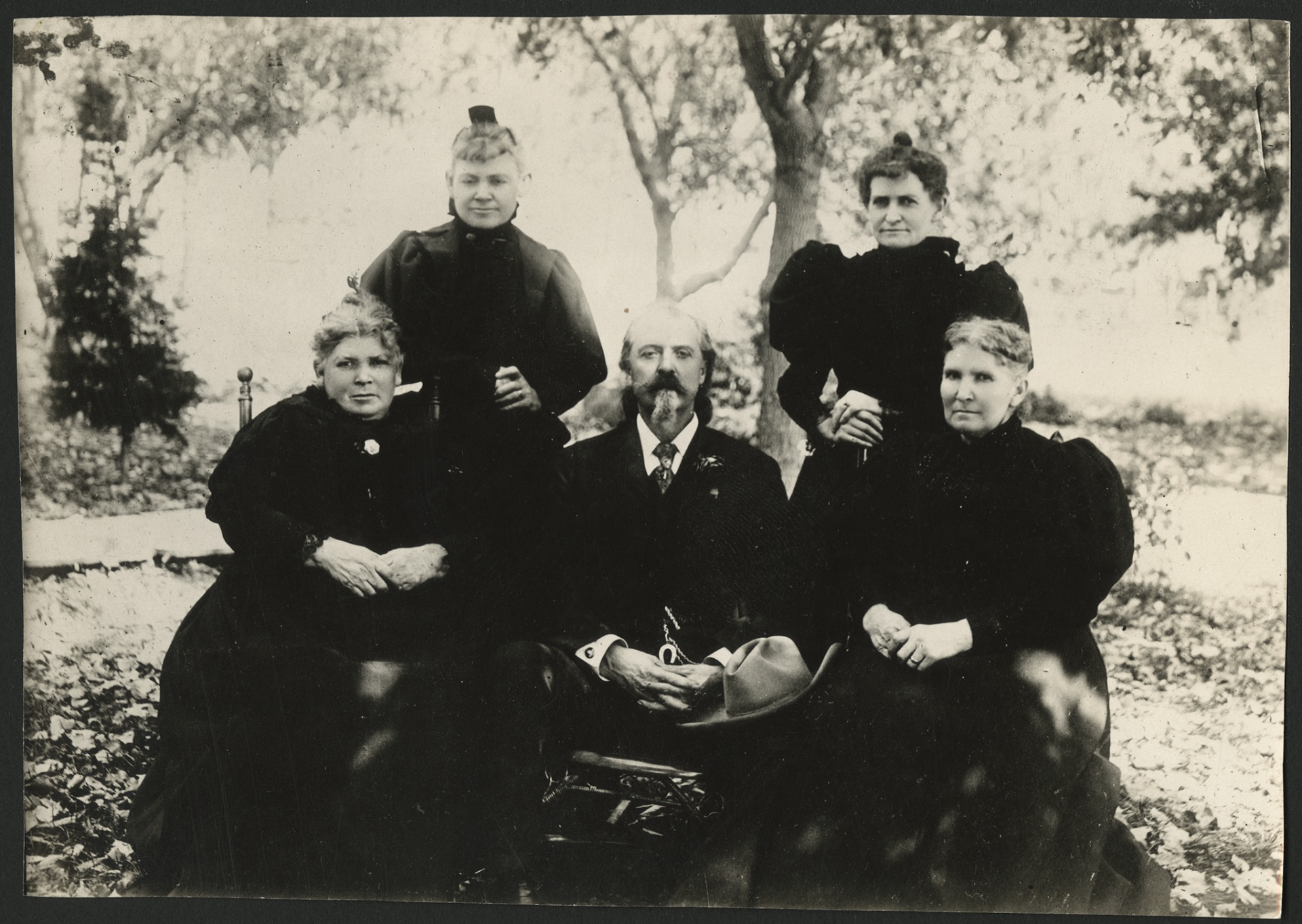
Cody and his four sisters c. 1890

Cody was born on February 26, 1846, on a farm just outside Le Claire, Iowa. His father, Isaac Cody, was born on September 5, 1811, in Toronto Township, Upper Canada, now part of Mississauga, Ontario, directly west of Toronto. Mary Ann Bonsell Laycock, Bill's mother, was born about 1817 in Trenton, New Jersey. She moved to Cincinnati to teach school, and there she met and married Isaac. She was a descendant of Josiah Bunting, a Quaker who had settled in Pennsylvania. There is no evidence to indicate Buffalo Bill was raised as a Quaker. In 1847 the couple moved to Ontario, having their son baptized in 1847, as William Cody, at the Dixie Union Chapel in Peel County (present-day Peel Region, of which Mississauga is a part), not far from the farm of his father's family. The chapel was built with Cody money, and the land was donated by Philip Cody of Toronto Township. They lived in Ontario for several years.

In 1853, Isaac Cody sold his land in rural Scott County, Iowa, for $2,000 (equivalent to $77,000 in 2025), and the family moved to Fort Leavenworth, Kansas Territory. In the years before the Civil War, Kansas was overtaken by political and physical conflict over the slavery question in an episode called Bleeding Kansas. Isaac Cody was against slavery. He was invited to speak at Rively's store, a local trading post where pro-slavery men often held meetings. His antislavery speech so angered the crowd that they threatened to kill him if he did not step down. A man jumped up and stabbed him twice with a Bowie knife. Rively, the store's owner, rushed Cody to get treatment, but he never fully recovered from his injuries.

In Kansas, the family was frequently persecuted by pro-slavery supporters. Cody's father spent time away from home for his safety. His enemies learned of a planned visit to his family and plotted to kill him on the way. Bill, despite his youth and being ill at the time, rode thirty miles (48 km) to warn his father. Isaac Cody went to Cleveland, Ohio, to organize a group of thirty families to bring back to Kansas, to add to the antislavery population. During his return trip, he caught a respiratory infection which, compounded by the lingering effects of his stabbing and complications from kidney disease, led to his death in April 1857.

After his death, the family suffered financially. At age 11, Bill worked for the freight carrier Russell, Majors, and Waddell as a "boy extra". On horseback, he would ride up and down the length of a wagon train and deliver messages between the drivers and workmen. Next, he joined Johnston's Army as an unofficial member of the scouts assigned to guide the United States Army to Utah, to put down a rumored rebellion by the Mormon population of Salt Lake City.

According to Cody's account in Buffalo Bill's Own Story, the Utah War was where he began his career as an "Indian fighter":

Presently the moon rose, dead ahead of me; and painted boldly across its face was the figure of an Indian. He wore this war-bonnet of the Sioux, at his shoulder was a rifle pointed at someone in the river-bottom 30 feet [9 meters] below; in another second he would drop one of my friends. I raised my old muzzle-loader and fired. The figure collapsed, tumbled down the bank and landed with a splash in the water. "What is it?" called McCarthy, as he hurried back. "It's over there in the water." "Hi!" he cried. "Little Billy's killed an Indian all by himself!" So began my career as an Indian fighter.

At the age of 14, in 1860, Cody was caught up in the "gold fever", with news of gold at Fort Colville and the Holcomb Valley Gold Rush in California. On his way to the goldfields, however, he met an agent for the Pony Express. He signed with them, and after building several stations and corrals, Cody was given a job as a rider. He worked at this until he was called home to his sick mother's bedside.

Cody claimed to have had many jobs, including trapper, bullwhacker, "Fifty-Niner" in Colorado, Pony Express rider in 1860, wagonmaster, stagecoach driver, and a hotel manager, but historians have had difficulty documenting them. He may have fabricated some for publicity. Namely, it is argued that in contrast to Cody's claims, he never rode for the Pony Express, but as a boy, he did work for its parent company, the transport firm of Russell, Majors, and Waddell. In contrast to the adventurous rides, hundreds of miles long, that he recounted in the press, his real job was to carry messages on horseback from the firm's office in Leavenworth to the telegraph station three miles away.

In the summer of 1861, after the Civil War had begun, 15-year-old Billy Cody joined a gang of horse thieves who raided towns and farms across the state line in Missouri. He denied he was a murderous Jayhawker, but was retaliating against Missourians for their support of the Confederacy by stealing their property.

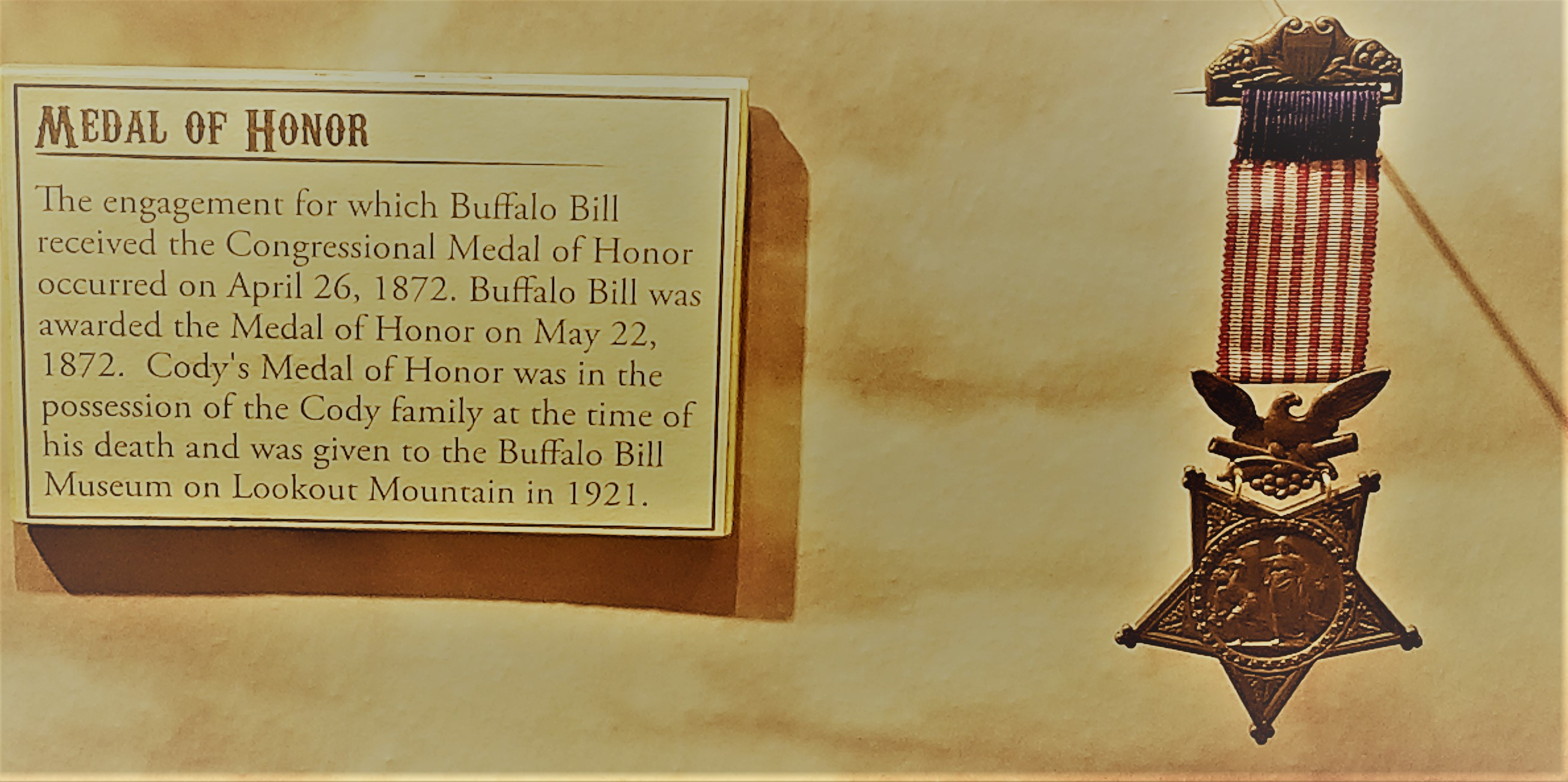

== Military services ==
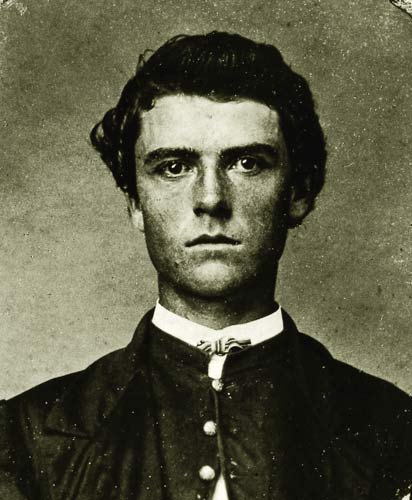
Cody in 1864 at the age of 19

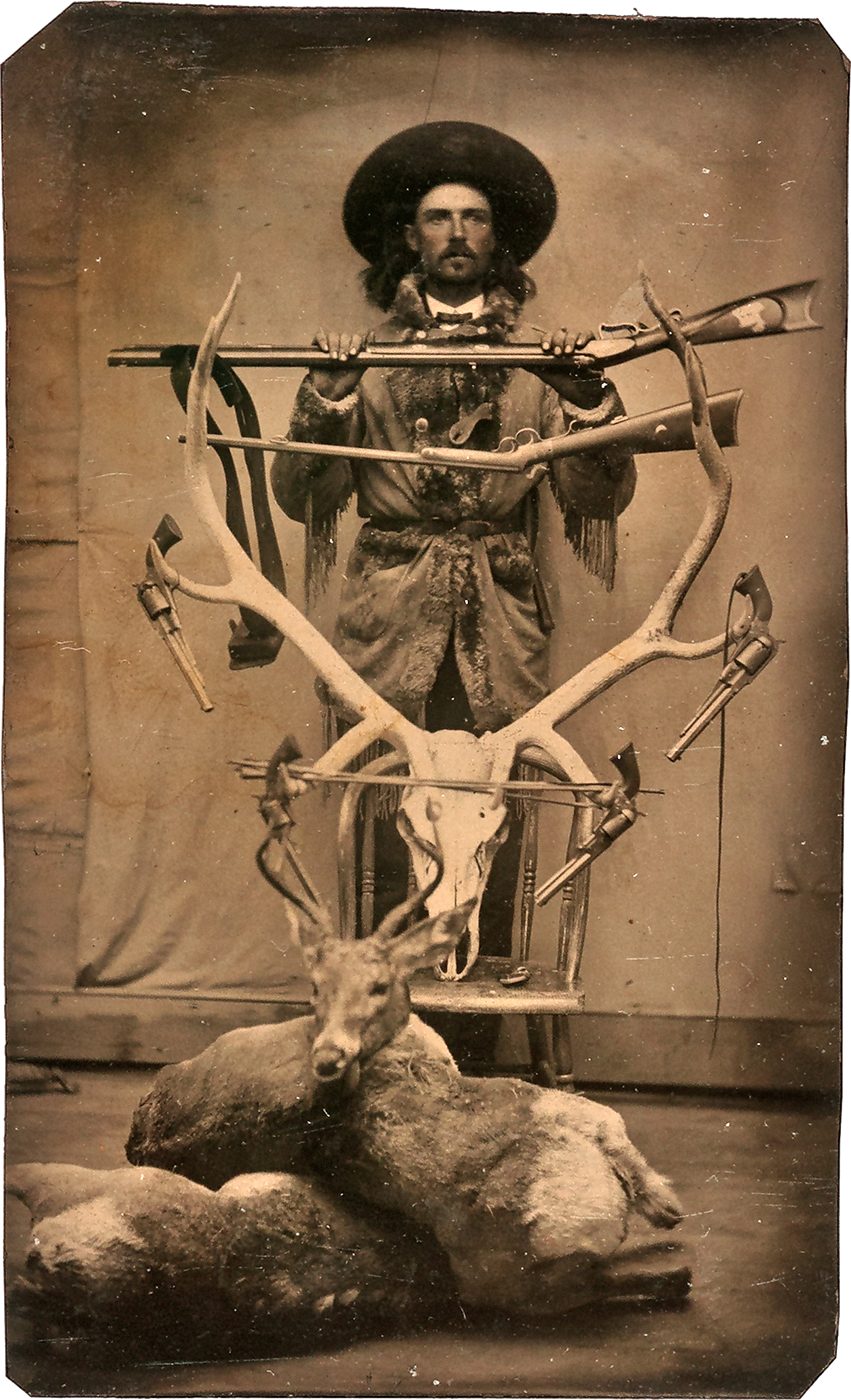
In 1871

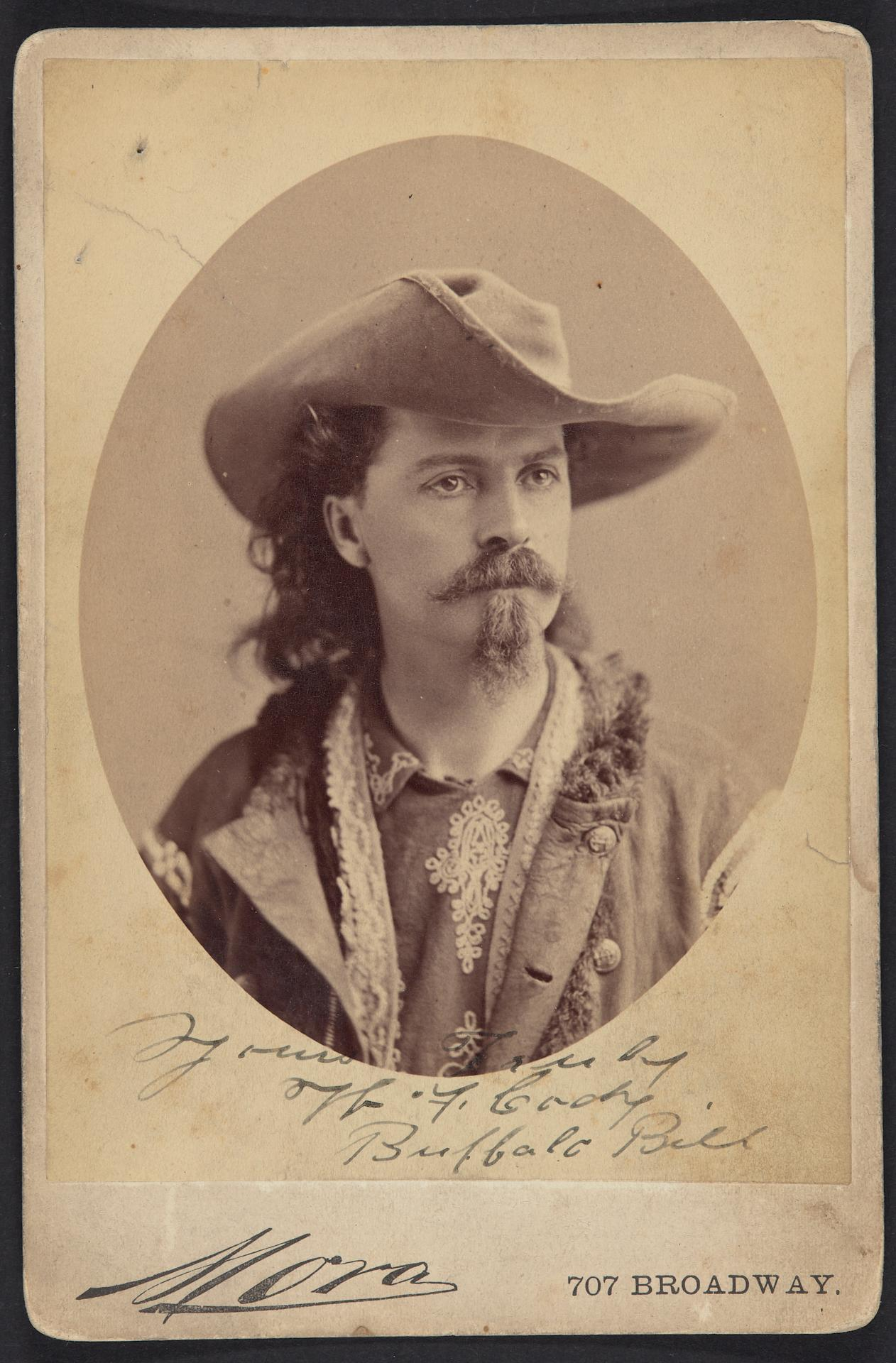
Buffalo Bill c. 1875

After his mother recovered, Cody wanted to enlist as a soldier in the Union Army during the American Civil War but was refused because of his young age. He began working with a freight caravan that delivered supplies to Fort Laramie in present-day Wyoming. In September 1863 Cody's mother died in Leavenworth, Kansas. Cody gave way to grief for two months, gambling and drinking. He had promised his mother he wouldn't enlist in the Union Army while she was alive, but one day, technically underage at age 17 and apparently while drunk, he enlisted as a teamster with the rank of private in Company H, 7th Kansas Cavalry, and served until discharged in 1865.

In 1866, he reunited with his old friend Wild Bill Hickok in Junction City, Kansas, then serving as a scout. Cody enlisted as a scout himself at Fort Ellsworth and scouted between there and Fort Fletcher (later renamed and moved to Fort Hays). He was attached as a scout, variously, to Captain George Augustus Armes (Battle of the Saline River) and Lieutenant Colonel George Armstrong Custer (guide and impromptu horse race to Fort Larned). It was during this service at Fort Ellsworth that he met William Rose, with whom he would found the short-lived settlement of Rome.

In 1867, with the construction of the Kansas Pacific Railway completing through Hays City and Rome, Cody was granted a leave of absence to hunt buffalo to supply railroad construction workers with meat. This endeavor continued into 1868, which saw his hunting contest with William Comstock.

Cody returned to Army service in 1868. From his post in Fort Larned, he performed an exceptional feat of riding as a lone dispatch courier from Fort Larned to Fort Zarah (escaping brief capture), Fort Zarah to Fort Hays, Fort Hays to Fort Dodge, Fort Dodge to Fort Larned, and, finally, Fort Larned to Fort Hays, a total of 350 miles in 58 hours through hostile territory, covering the last 35 miles on foot. In response, General Philip Sheridan assigned him Chief of Scouts for the 5th Cavalry Regiment.

He was also Chief of Scouts for the Third Cavalry in later campaigns of the Plains Wars.

In January 1872, Cody was a scout for the highly publicized hunting expedition of the Grand Duke Alexei Alexandrovich of Russia.

== Medal of Honor ==
Cody was awarded the Medal of Honor in 1872 for documented gallantry above and beyond the call of duty as an Army scout in the Indian Wars. It was revoked in 1917, along with medals of 910 other recipients dating back to the Revolutionary War, when Congress decided to create a hierarchy of medals, designating the "Medal of Honor" as the highest military honor it could bestow. Subsequent regulations authorized the War Department to revoke prior Medal of Honor awards it considered not meeting requirements since the introduction of strict regulations promulgated under the 1917 law. Those regulations required the medal to be awarded for acts of bravery above and beyond the call of duty by officers or enlisted soldiers. The law was enacted days before Buffalo Bill died, so he never knew a law might rescind the medal awarded to him.

All civilian scout medals were rescinded since they did not appear to meet the basic criterion of being officers or enlisted soldiers, which had been expressly listed in every authorizing statute ever enacted for the Medal of Honor. Cody was one of five scouts affected. Their medals were stripped shortly after Cody died in 1917.

Cody's relatives objected, and, for over 72 years, they wrote repeatedly to the US Congress seeking reconsideration. All efforts failed, until a 1988 letter to the Senate from Cody's grandson was received by the office of senator Alan K. Simpson of Wyoming. There, a newly assigned legislative assistant (K. Yale) took up the cause in 1989. The legal brief he drafted and submitted to the Department of Defense on behalf of the relatives of Buffalo Bill argued that civilian scouts were technically officers, as their Native American counterparts were nominally scouts. However, the white civilian scouts were given the rank and pay of officers – both for retention purposes. Also, scouts were the equivalent of "reconnaissance" for the military and thus provided highly valued services. In addition, a practical reason was to avoid mistaking them for opponents in skirmishes.

Moreover, although civilian scouts might have normally been officers because of their highly valued skills, the military drawdown and related budget cuts after the Civil War left no billets available for the civilian scouts to fill, and thus they were relegated to a highly qualified status that treated them as valuable military assets without the designation or retirement benefits of officers. Nevertheless, they were treated as high-ranking military officials and had status of officers alongside their Native American brethren. The brief argued for retroactive restoration of the Medal of Honor to Buffalo Bill. The Department of Defense required the appeal to be adjudicated by the Army Board for Correction of Military Records. After months of deliberation, the Board agreed with the persuasive legal brief and made the decision to restore the Medal of Honor, not only to Buffalo Bill but also to several other civilian scouts whose medals had also been rescinded.

Long after the medal was restored, the decision was thought to be controversial for several reasons. Some people interpreted Simpson's submission as arguing that the law had never required Cody to be a soldier. However, this was not a key element of Simpson's brief. According to these interpretations, Simpson's submission cited a book, Above and Beyond, to illustrate the lack of requirement to be a soldier. But, the legal brief acknowledged that Medal of Honor recipients had to be an officer or enlisted soldier. Another problem cited by some was the authority of the Board to contravene several federal statutes because the Medal of Honor revocation had been expressly authorized by Congress, meaning that the restoration went against the law in force in 1872, the law requiring the revocation in 1916, and the modern statute enacted in 1918 (it remains substantially unmodified today). However, the legal brief clearly did not suggest overturning of the law, but rather conforming the status of civilian scouts to that of other scouts similarly situated (source: copy of the actual legal brief, by the author).

Since the Board of Correction is merely a delegation of the Secretary of the Army's authority, some suggest a separation of powers conflict, since even the president cannot contravene a clear statute and, although Cody's case was dealt with below the cabinet level, the legal brief was written in conformance with the statutes. Modern Medal of Honor cases originating from the board, such as the recent case of Garlin Conner, required both executive action as well as a statutory waiver from Congress, which underscores the point that some cases might be in conflict with statutes.

In the Cody case, the board's governing assistant secretary recognized that it lacked the authority to reinstate the medal directly, and so decided to return the case to the board for reconsideration. As a result, the board amended Cody's record to make him an enlisted soldier – aligning it with the legal argument that civilian scouts were the equivalent to officers or enlisted soldiers – so that he would fall within the legal requirements, and did the same for four other civilian guides who had also had their medals rescinded. In doing so, the board overlooked the fact that Cody was a civilian guide with far greater employment flexibility than a soldier, including the ability to resign at will. Nevertheless the Board did recognize the value that all scouts provided, whether Native American or otherwise, and that they volunteered to put themselves in harm's way (e.g. Buffalo Bill saved the lives of several soldiers by rushing onto an active battlefield and pulling them to safety while under fire) instead of pursuing less demanding civilian jobs.

== Nickname ==
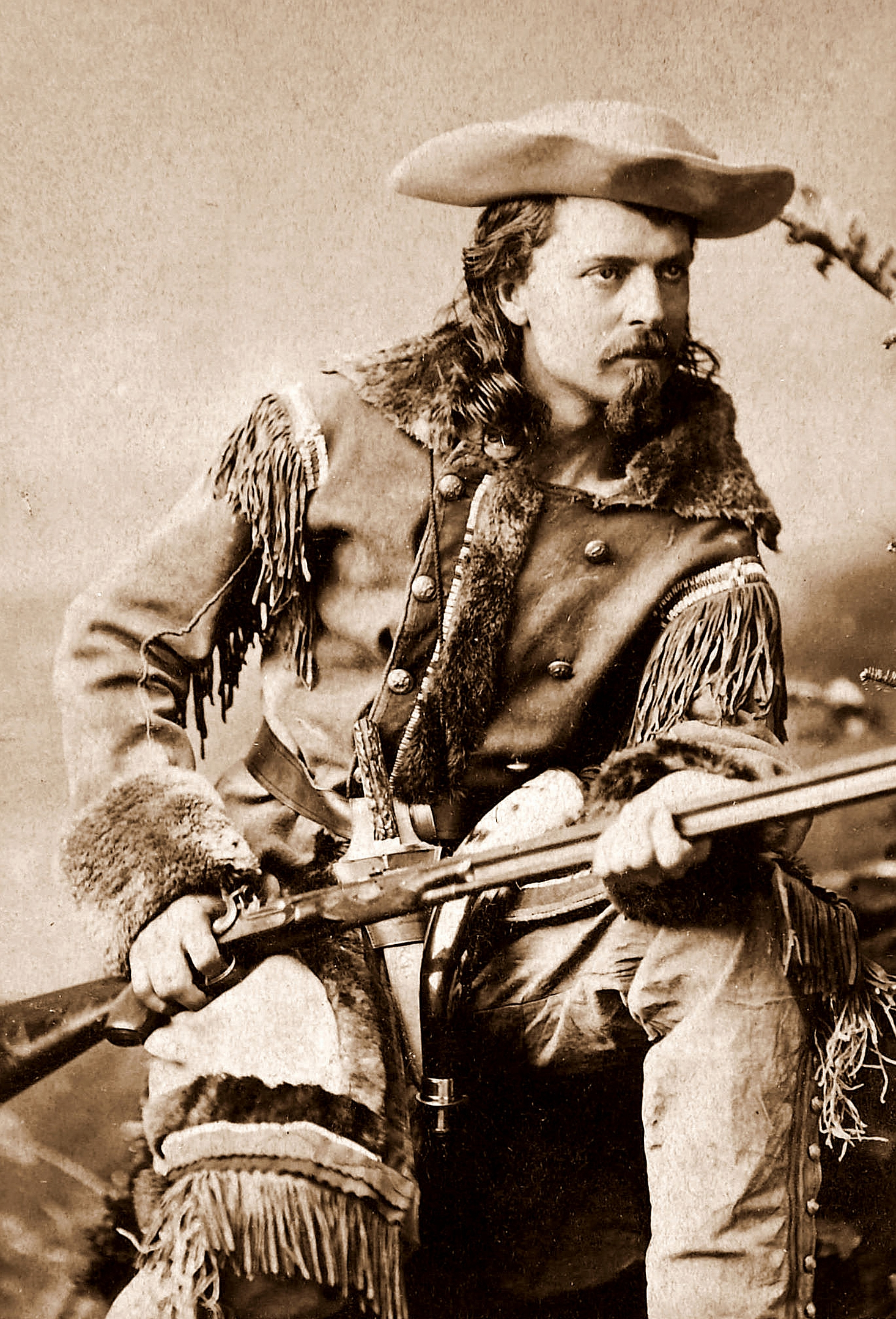
"Buffalo Bill" was nicknamed after his contract to supply Kansas Pacific Railroad workers with buffalo meat.

Cody received the nickname "Buffalo Bill" after the American Civil War, when he had a contract to supply Kansas Pacific Railroad workers with buffalo (American bison) meat. Cody is purported to have killed 4,282 buffalo in eighteen months in 1867 and 1868. Cody and another hunter, Bill Comstock, competed in an eight-hour buffalo-shooting match over the exclusive right to use the name, which Cody won by killing 68 animals to Comstock's 48. Comstock, part Cheyenne and a noted hunter, scout, and interpreter, used a fast-shooting Henry repeating rifle, while Cody competed with a larger-caliber Springfield Model 1866, which he called Lucretia Borgia, after the notorious Italian noblewoman, the subject of a popular contemporary Gaetano Donizetti opera Lucrezia Borgia, based on Victor Hugo's play of the same name. Cody explained that while his formidable opponent, Comstock, chased after his buffalo, engaging from the rear of the herd and leaving a trail of killed buffalo "scattered over a distance of three miles", Cody – likening his strategy to a billiards player "nursing" his billiard balls during "a big run" – first rode his horse to the front of the herd to target the leaders, forcing the followers to one side, eventually causing them to circle and create an easy target, and dropping them close together.

== Birth of the legend ==
In 1869, the 23-year-old Cody met Ned Buntline, who later published a story based on Cody's adventures (largely invented by the writer) in Street and Smith's New York Weekly and then published a highly successful novel, Buffalo Bill, King of the Bordermen, which was first serialized on the front page of the Chicago Tribune, beginning that December 15. Many other sequels followed by Buntline, Prentiss Ingraham and others from the 1870s through the early part of the twenty first century.

Playwright Frederick G. Maeder adapted Buntline's novel into the hit play Buffalo Bill which premiered at Niblo's Garden in 1872 with J. B. Studley in the title role. Cody attended this play while visiting New York which gave him the idea to portray himself on the stage. He later became world-famous for Buffalo Bill's Wild West, a touring show which traveled around the United States, Great Britain, and Continental Europe. Audiences were enthusiastic about seeing a piece of the American West. Emilio Salgari, a noted Italian writer of adventure stories, met Buffalo Bill when he came to Italy and saw his show; Salgari later featured Cody as a hero in some of his novels.

== Buffalo Bill's Wild West ==
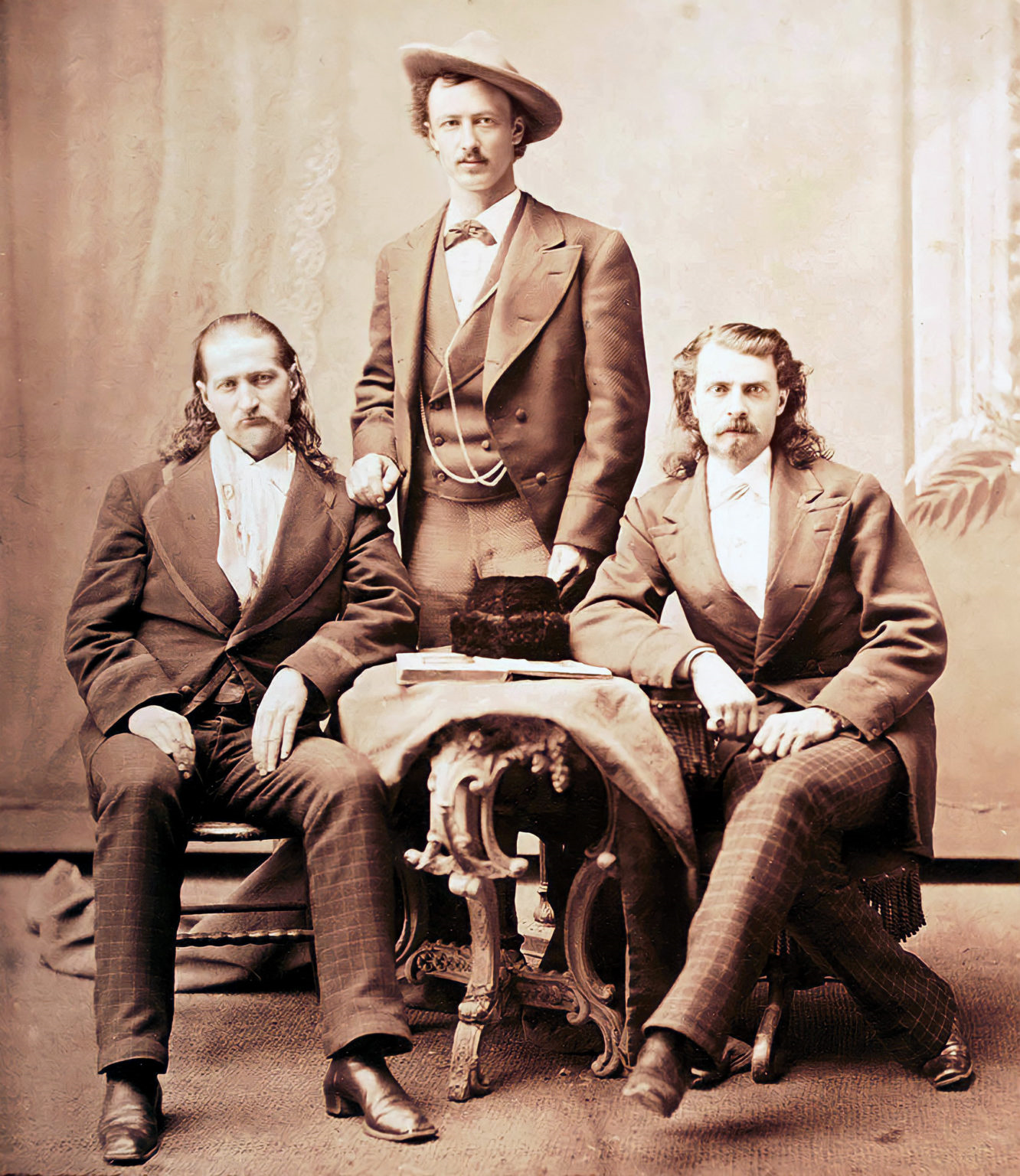
"Wild Bill" Hickok, Texas Jack Omohundro, and Cody in 1873

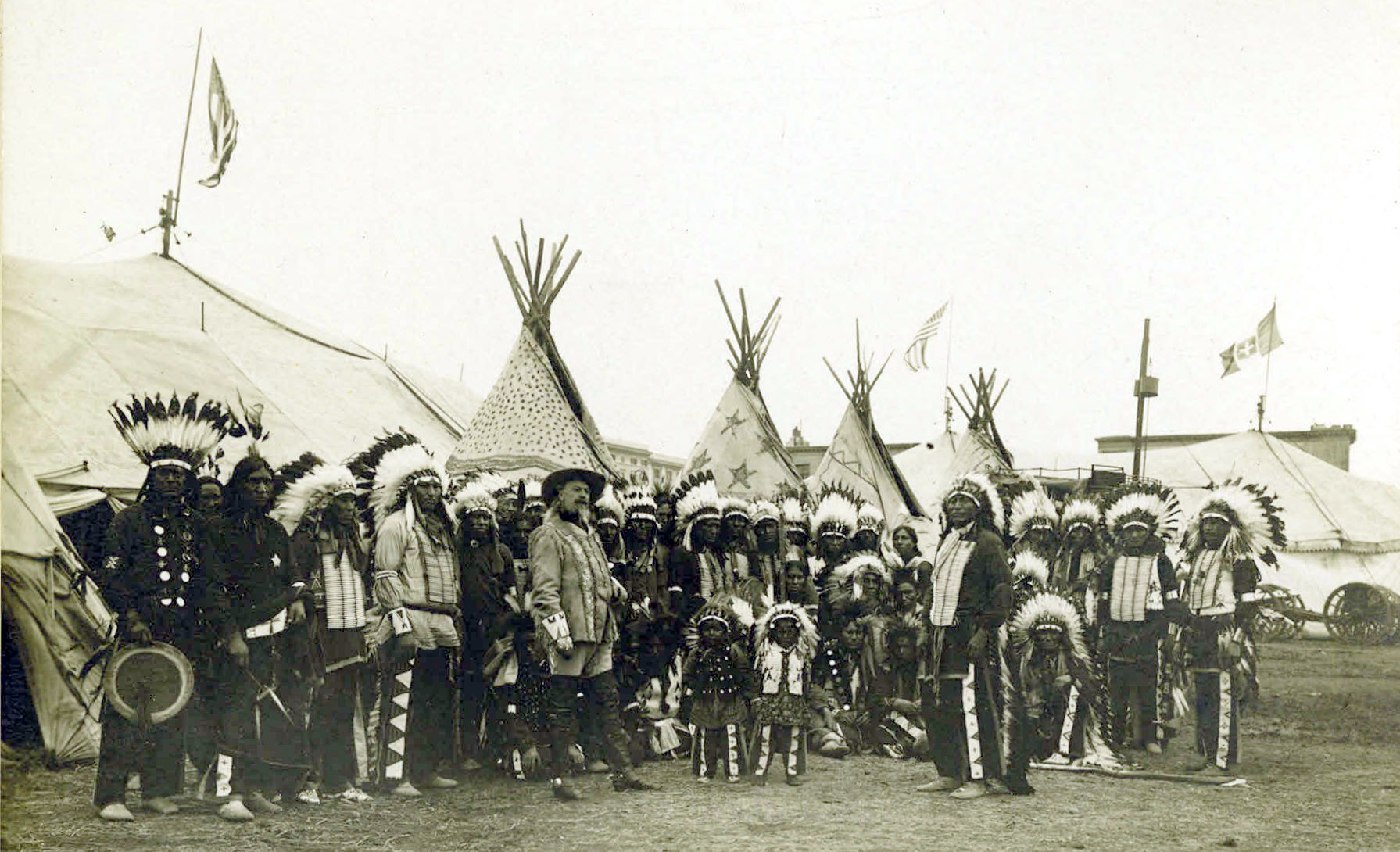
Buffalo Bill's Wild West, 1890, Italy

In December 1872, Cody traveled to Chicago to make his stage debut with his friend Texas Jack Omohundro in The Scouts of the Prairie, one of the original Wild West shows produced by Ned Buntline. The effort was panned by critics – one critic compared Cody's acting to a "diffident schoolboy" – but the performer was a hit with the sold-out crowds.

In 1873, Cody invited Wild Bill Hickok to join the group in a new play called Scouts of the Plains. Hickok did not enjoy acting and often hid behind scenery; in one show, he shot at the spotlight when it focused on him. He was therefore released from the group after a few months. Cody founded the Buffalo Bill Combination in 1874, in which he performed for part of the year while scouting on the prairies the rest of the year. The troupe toured for ten years. Cody's part typically included a reenactment of an 1876 incident at Warbonnet Creek, where he claimed to have scalped a Cheyenne warrior.

In 1883, in the area of North Platte, Nebraska, Cody founded Buffalo Bill's Wild West, a circus-like attraction that toured annually. (Contrary to the popular misconception, the word Show was not a part of the title.) In 1886, Cody and Nate Salsbury, his theatrical manager, entered into partnership with Evelyn Booth (1860–1901), a big-game hunter and scion of the aristocratic Booth family. It was at this time Buffalo Bill's Cowboy Band was organized. The band was directed by William Sweeney, a cornet player who served as leader of the Cowboy Band from 1883 until 1913. Sweeney handled all of the musical arrangements and wrote a majority of the music performed by the Cowboy Band.

In 1893, Cody changed the title to Buffalo Bill's Wild West and Congress of Rough Riders of the World. The show began with a parade on horseback, with participants from horse-culture groups that included the US and another military, cowboys, American Indians, and performers from all over the world in their best attire. Turks, gauchos, Arabs, Mongols and Georgians displayed their distinctive horses and colorful costumes. Visitors would see main events, feats of skill, staged races, and sideshows. Many historical western figures participated in the show. For example, Sitting Bull appeared with a band of 20 of his soldiers.

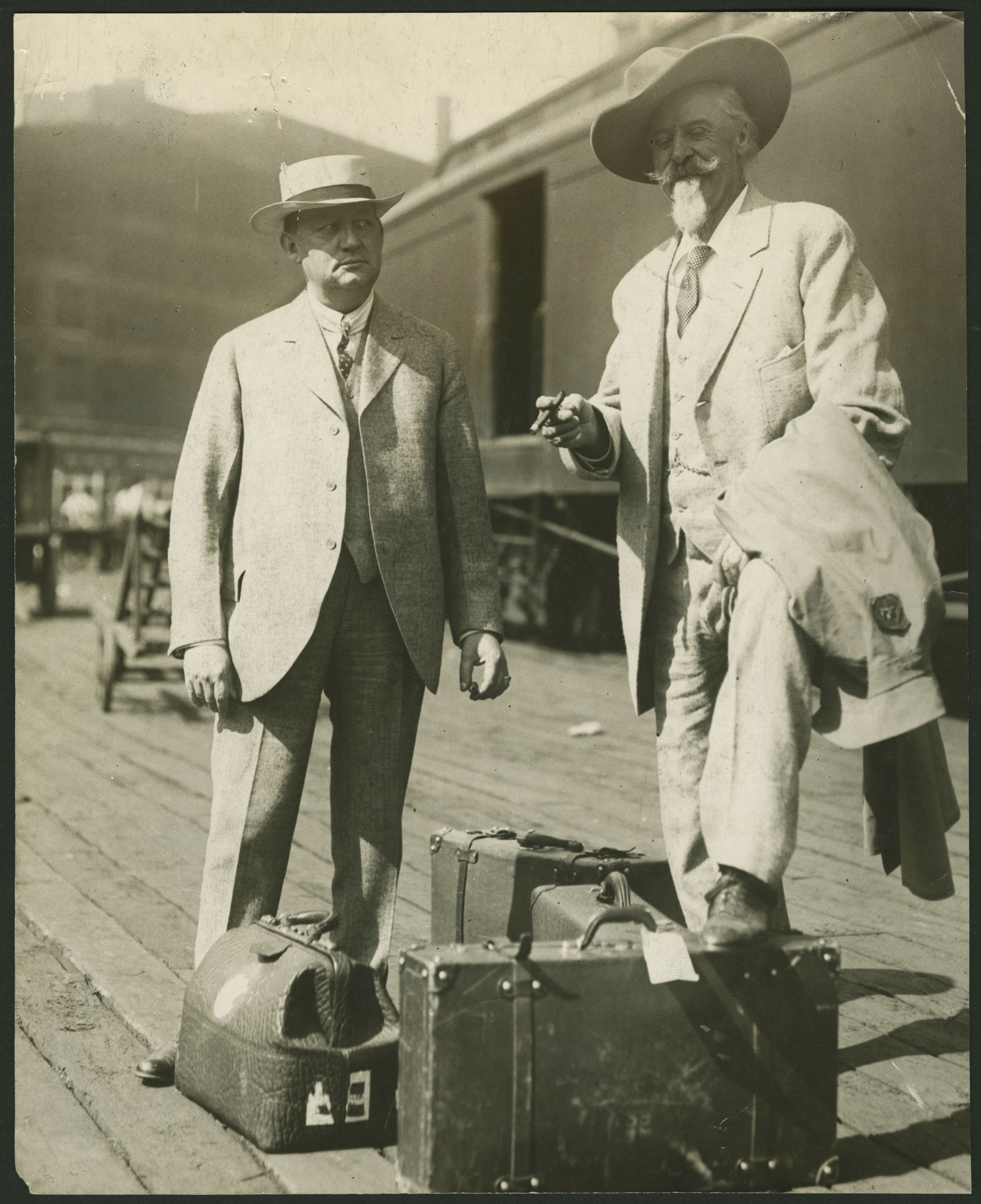
Cody (right) standing with Harry Heye Tammen (left) at the Kansas City Rail Depot, 1913

Cody's headline performers were well known in their own right. Annie Oakley and her husband, Frank Butler, were sharpshooters, together with the likes of Gabriel Dumont and Lillian Smith. Performers re-enacted the riding of the Pony Express, Indian attacks on wagon trains, and stagecoach robberies. The show was said to end with a re-enactment of Custer's Last Stand, in which Cody portrayed General Custer, but this is more legend than fact. The finale was typically a portrayal of an Indian attack on a settler's cabin. Cody would ride in with an entourage of cowboys to defend a settler and his family. This finale was featured predominantly as early as 1886 but was not performed after 1907; it was used in 23 of 33 tours. Another celebrity appearing on the show was Calamity Jane, as a storyteller as of 1893. The show influenced many 20th-century portrayals of the West in cinema and literature.

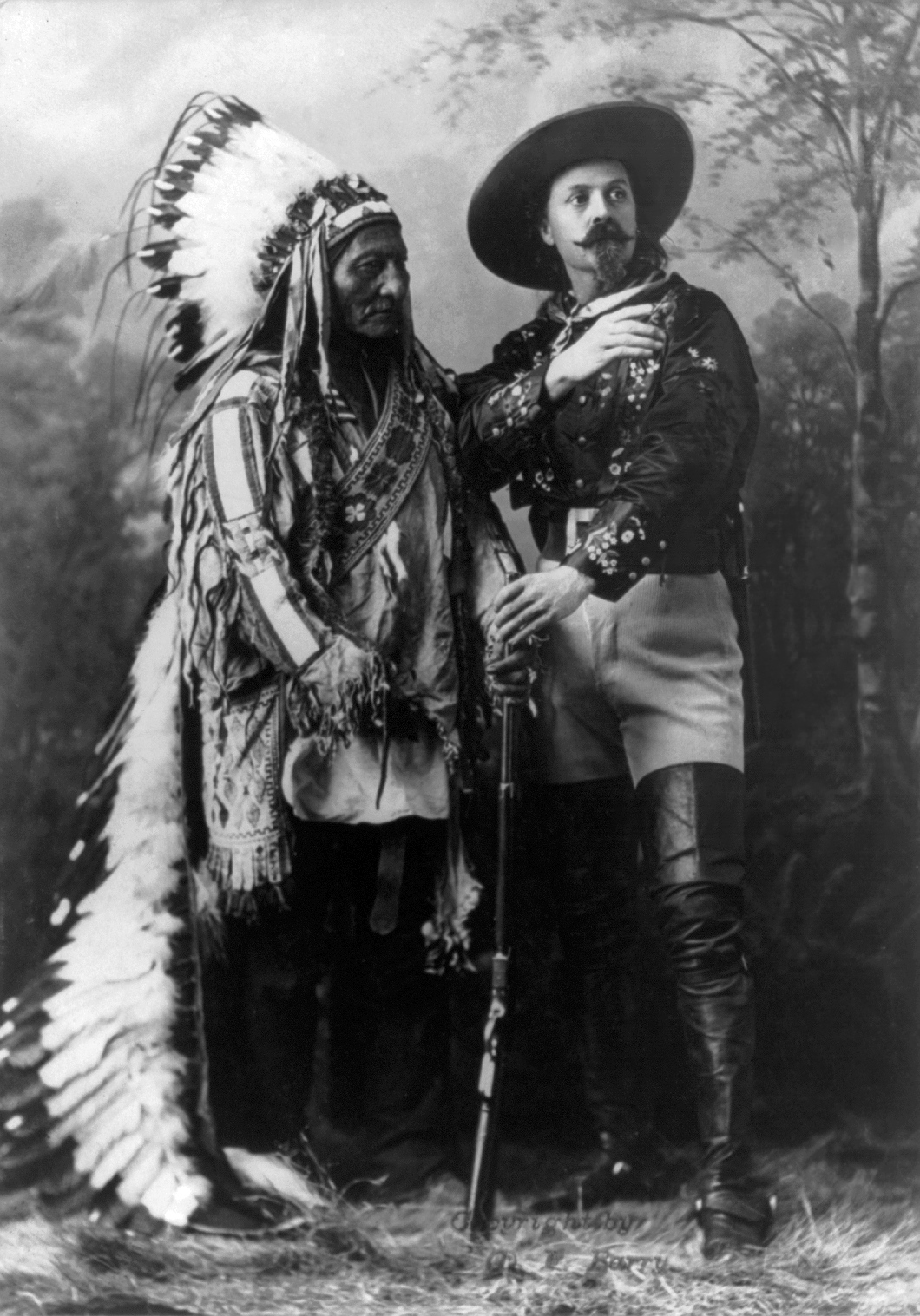
Sitting Bull and Buffalo Bill, Montreal, Quebec, Canada, 1885

With his profits, Cody purchased a 4,000-acre (16-km^{2}) ranch near North Platte, Nebraska, in 1886. The Scout's Rest Ranch included an eighteen-room mansion and a large barn for winter storage of the show's livestock.

In 1887, invited by the British businessman John Robinson Whitley, Cody took the show to Great Britain in celebration of the Jubilee year of Queen Victoria, who attended a performance. It played in London and then in Birmingham and Salford, near Manchester, where it stayed for five months.

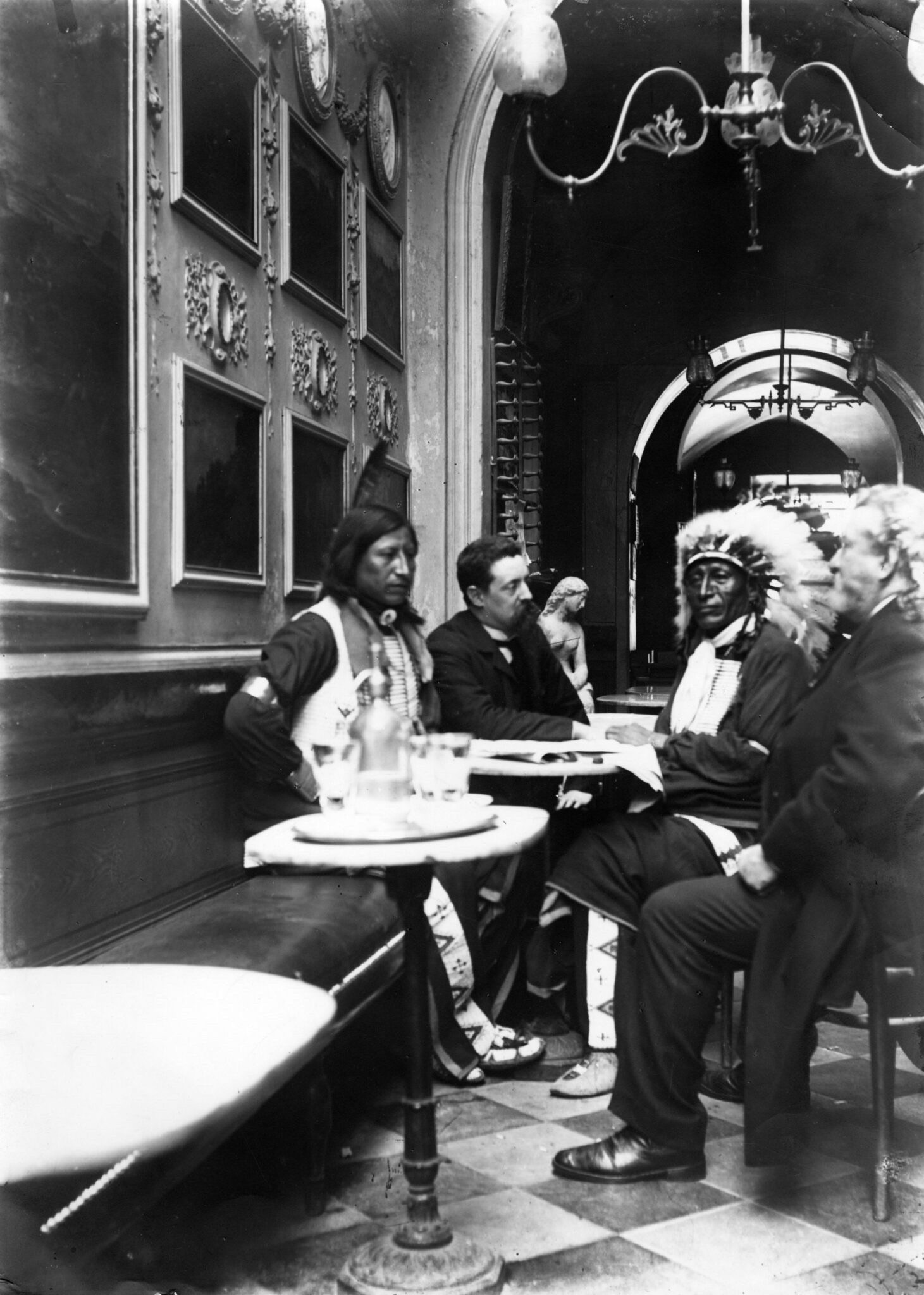
Buffalo Bill (far right), Sitting Bull, Black Elk and the Italian journalist and writer Diego Angeli at the famous Antico Caffè Greco in Rome in February 1890, during the Italian tour of the Wild West Show.

Cody set up an independent exhibition near the Chicago World's Fair of 1893, which greatly contributed to his popularity in the United States. It vexed the promoters of the fair, who had rejected his request to participate.

In 1894, Edison Studios invited Buffalo Bill and his show to be filmed in an early silent film, Buffalo Bill.

On October 29, 1901, outside Lexington, North Carolina, a freight train crashed into one unit of the train carrying Buffalo Bill's show from Charlotte, North Carolina, to Danville, Virginia. The freight train's engineer had thought that the entire show train had passed, not realizing it was three units, and returned to the tracks; 110 horses, including his mounts Old Pap and Old Eagle, were killed in the crash or had to be killed later. Three young Native Americans were killed in the train accident and many others injured. Annie Oakley's injuries were so severe that she was told she would never walk again. She did recover and continued performing later. The incident put the show out of business for a while, and this disruption may have led to its eventual demise.

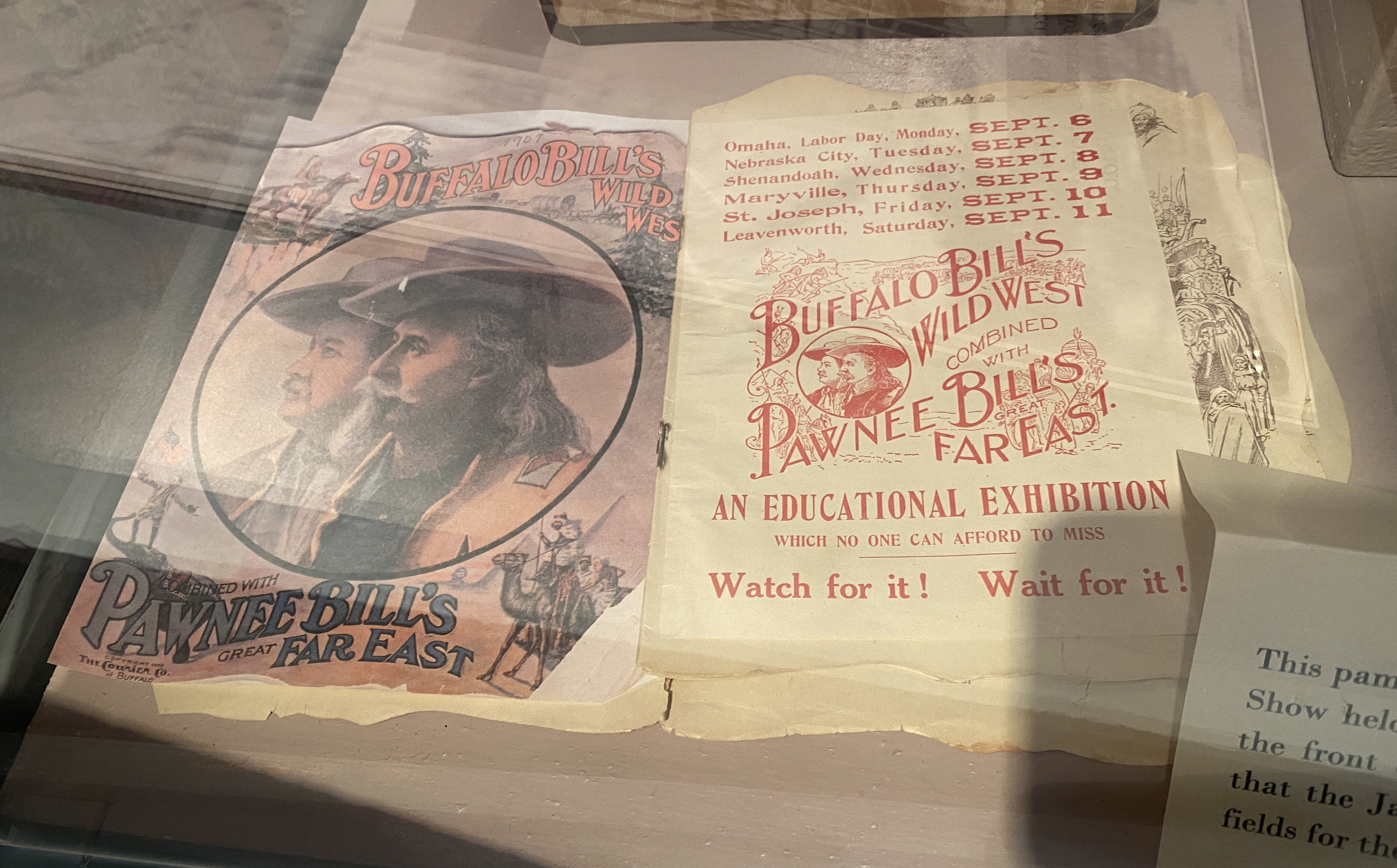
Pamphlet for Buffalo Bill's and Pawnee Bill's show in Nebraska City, 1907

In 1908, Pawnee Bill and Buffalo Bill joined forces and created the Two Bills show. That show was foreclosed on when it was playing in Denver, Colorado.

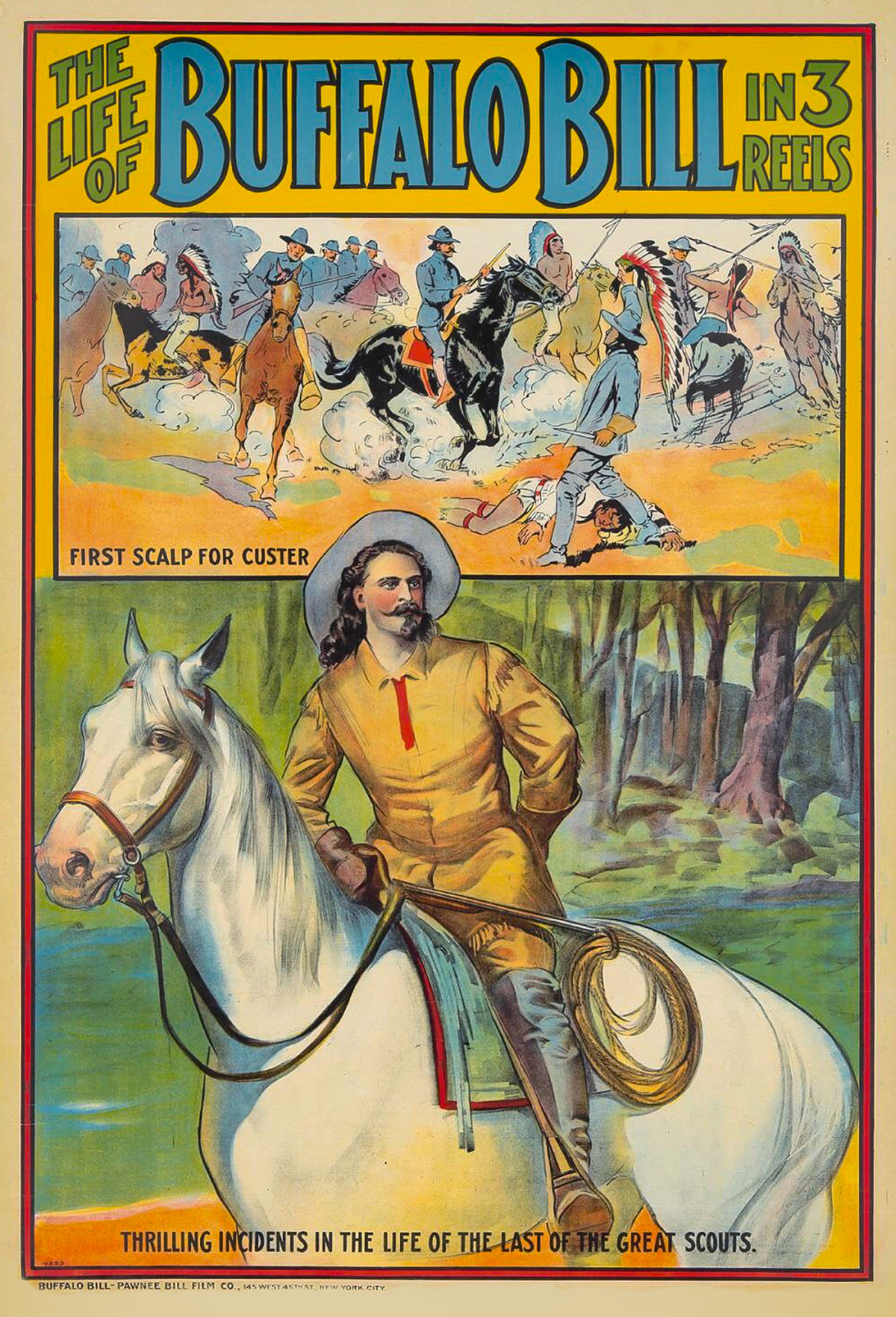
Poster for the 1912 film The Life of Buffalo Bill

The Buffalo Bill and Pawnee Bill Film Company, based in New York City, produced a three-reel motion picture in 1912 titled The Life of Buffalo Bill. Cody himself appears in scenes that bookend the short film, a series of adventures presented in flashback as Buffalo Bill's dreams. The film had two other directors before it was successfully completed by John B. O'Brien. The film is in the collection of the Library of Congress.

=== Buffalo Bill's Wild West tours of Europe ===
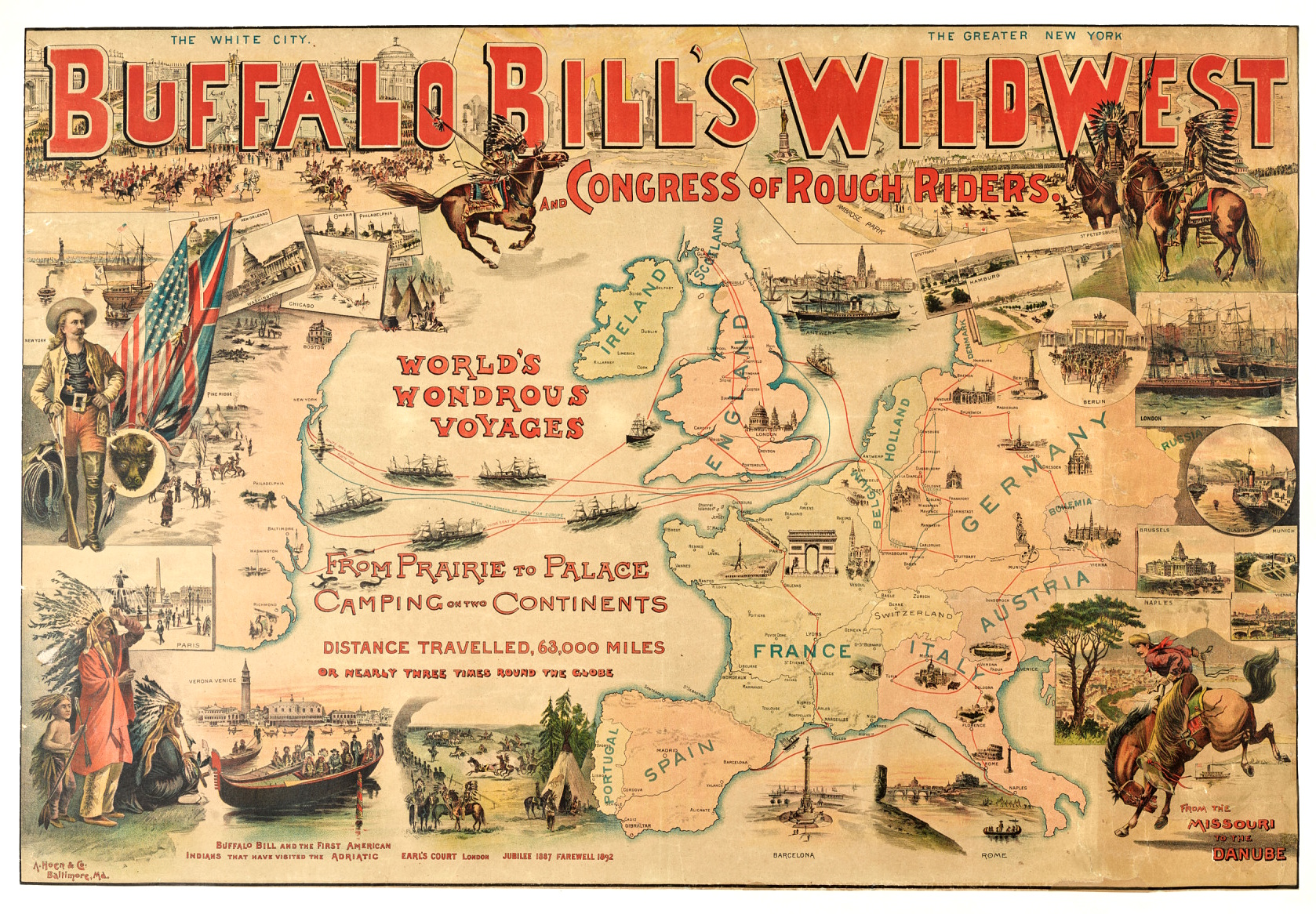
Buffalo Bill’s Wild West in Europe (Poster 1894)

Buffalo Bill's Wild West toured Europe eight times, the first four tours between 1887 and 1892, and the last four from 1902 to 1906.

The Wild West first went to London in 1887 as part of the American Exhibition, which coincided with the Golden Jubilee of Queen Victoria. The Prince of Wales, later King Edward VII, requested a private preview of the Wild West performance; he was impressed enough to arrange a command performance for Queen Victoria. The Queen enjoyed the show and meeting the performers, setting the stage for another command performance on June 20, 1887, for her Jubilee guests. Royalty from all over Europe attended, including the future Kaiser Wilhelm II and the future King George V. These royal encounters provided Buffalo Bill's Wild West an endorsement and publicity that ensured its success. Also, at this time, Buffalo Bill was presented with written accolades from several of America's high ranking generals including William T. Sherman, Philip H. Sheridan and William H. Emory testifying to his service, bravery, and character. Among the presentations was a document signed by Governor John M. Thayer of Nebraska appointing Cody as aide-de-camp on the Governor's staff with the rank of colonel dated March 8, 1887. The rank had little official authority but the English press quickly capitalized on the new title of "Colonel Cody". Buffalo Bill's Wild West closed its successful London run in October 1887 after more than 300 performances, with more than 2.5 million tickets sold. The tour made stops in Birmingham and Manchester before returning to the United States in May 1888 for a short summer tour.

Buffalo Bill's Wild West returned to Europe in May 1889 as part of the Exposition Universelle in Paris, an event that commemorated the 100th anniversary of the Storming of the Bastille and featured the debut of the Eiffel Tower. On this tour, his portrait was painted by Europe's leading female painter Rosa Bonheur. The tour moved to the South of France and Barcelona, Spain, then on to Italy. While in Rome, a Wild West delegation was received by Pope Leo XIII. Buffalo Bill was disappointed that the condition of the Colosseum did not allow it to be a venue; however, at Verona, the Wild West did perform in the ancient Roman amphitheater. The tour finished with stops in Austria-Hungary and Germany.

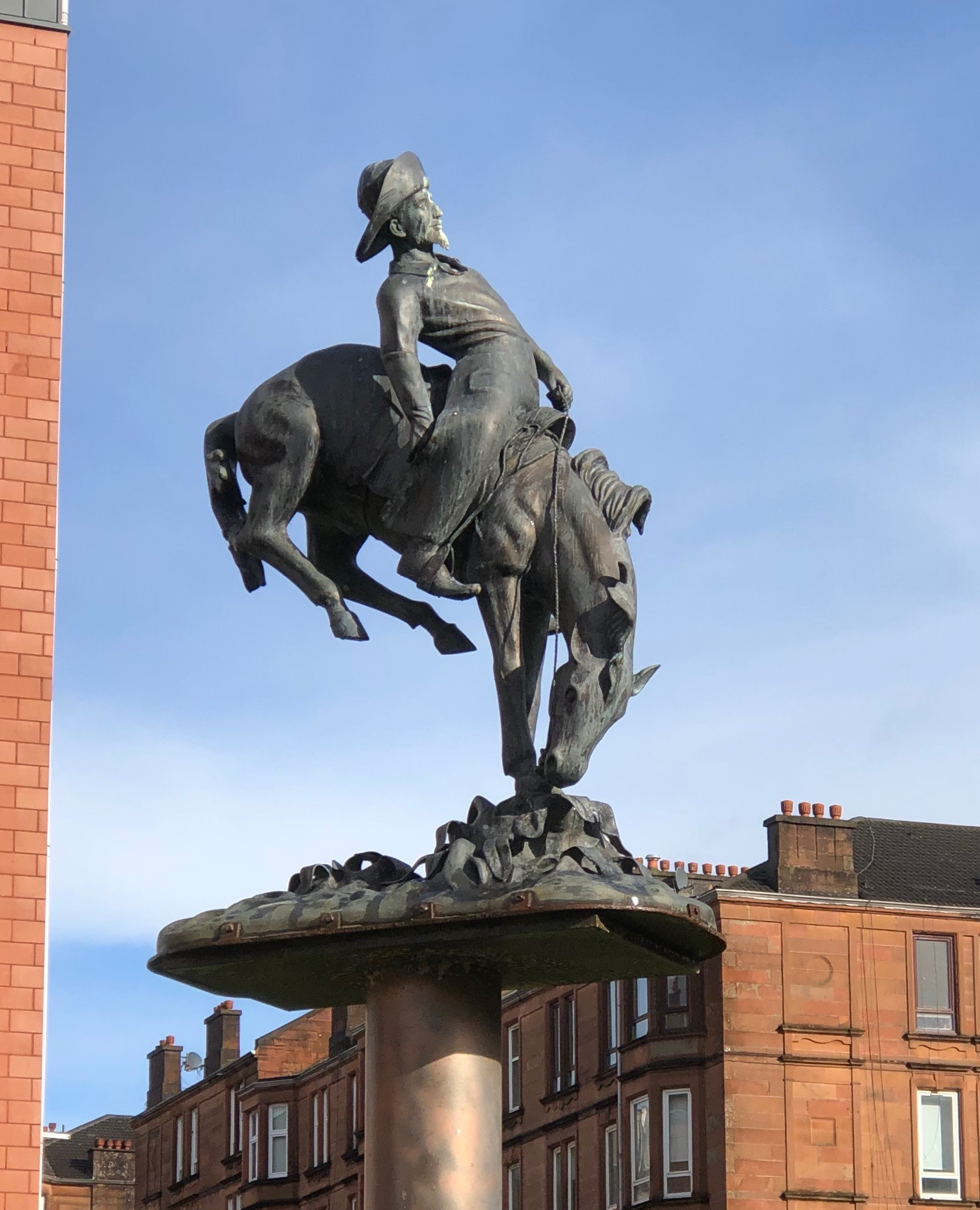
Buffalo Bill statue commemorating his 1891–92 Wild West Show at Dennistoun, Glasgow.

In 1891 the show toured cities in Belgium and the Netherlands before returning to Great Britain to close the season. Cody depended on several staffs to manage arrangements for touring with the large and complex show: in 1891 Major Arizona John Burke was the general manager for the Buffalo Bill Wild West Company; William Laugan [sic], supply agent; George C. Crager, Sioux interpreter, considered leader of relations with the Indians; and John Shangren, a native interpreter. In 1891, Buffalo Bill performed in Karlsruhe, Germany, in the Südstadt Quarter. The inhabitants of Südstadt are nicknamed Indianer (German for "American Indians") to this day, and the most accepted theory says that this is due to Buffalo Bill's show. In October Cody brought the show to Dennistoun, Glasgow, where it ran from November 16 until February 27, 1892, in the East End Exhibition Building, and George C. Crager sold The Ghost Shirt to the Kelvingrove Museum.

The show's 1892 tour was confined to Great Britain; it featured another command performance for Queen Victoria. The tour finished with a six-month run in London before leaving Europe for nearly a decade.

Buffalo Bill's Wild West returned to Europe in December 1902 with a fourteen-week run in London, capped by a visit from King Edward VII and the future King George V. The Wild West traveled throughout Great Britain in a tour in 1902 and 1903 and a tour in 1904, performing in nearly every city large enough to support it. The 1905 tour began in April with a two-month run in Paris, after which the show traveled around France, performing mostly one-night stands, concluding in December. The final tour, in 1906, began in France on March 4 and quickly moved to Italy for two months. The show then traveled east, performing in Austro-Hungarian territories of Bohemia (now the Czech Republic) and Croatia-Slavonia, before returning west to tour in Galicia (now part of Poland), then Germany, and Belgium.

The show was enormously successful in Europe, making Cody an international celebrity and an American icon. Mark Twain commented, "It is often said on the other side of the water that none of the exhibitions which we send to England are purely and distinctly American. If you will take the Wild West show over there you can remove that reproach." The Wild West brought an exotic foreign world to life for its European audiences, allowing a last glimpse at the fading American frontier.

Several members of the Wild West show died of accidents or disease during these tours in Europe:

- Surrounded by the Enemy (1865–1887), of the Oglala Lakota band, died of a lung infection. His remains were buried at Brompton Cemetery in London. Red Penny, the one-year-old son of Little Chief and Good Robe, had died four months earlier and was buried in the same cemetery.
- Paul Eagle Star (1864–1891), of the Brulé Lakota band, died in Sheffield, of tetanus and complications from injuries caused when his horse fell on him, breaking his leg. He was buried in Brompton Cemetery. His remains were exhumed in March 1999 and transported to the Rosebud Indian Reservation, in South Dakota, by his grandchildren Moses and Lucy Eagle Star II. The remains were reburied in the Lakota cemetery in Rosebud two months later.
- Long Wolf (1833–1892), of the Oglala Lakota band, died of pneumonia and was buried in Brompton Cemetery. His remains were exhumed and transported to South Dakota's Pine Ridge Indian Reservation in September 1997 by his descendants, including his great-grandson, John Black Feather. The remains were reburied at Saint Ann's Cemetery, in Denby.
- White Star Ghost Dog (1890–1892), of the Oglala Lakota band, died after a horse-riding accident and was buried in Brompton Cemetery. Her remains were exhumed and transported to the Pine Ridge Indian Reservation, in South Dakota, in September 1997, with those of Long Wolf, and were reburied at Saint Ann's Cemetery, in Denby.

== Life in Cody, Wyoming ==
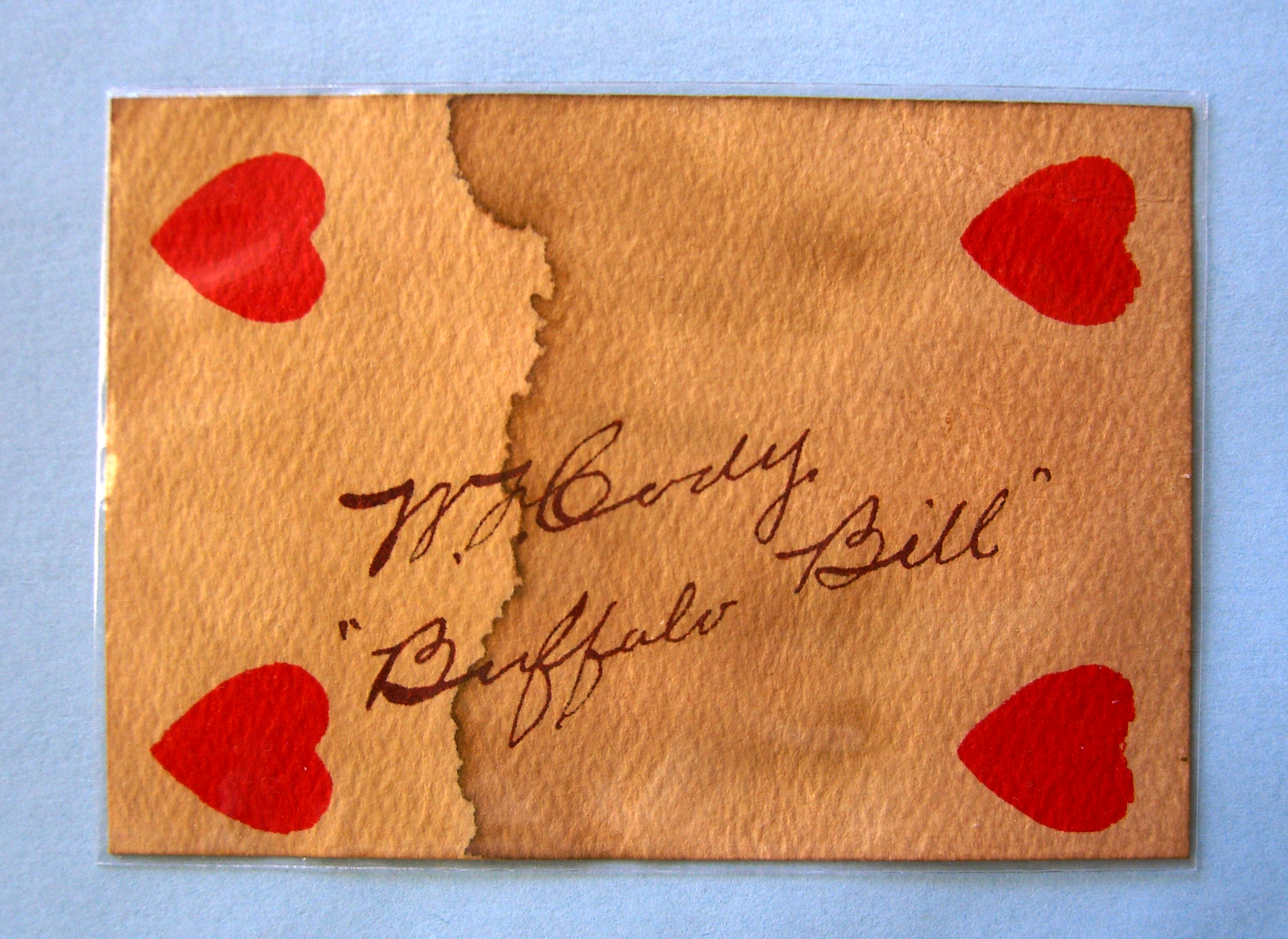
Playing card signed by Buffalo Bill

In 1895, Cody was instrumental in the founding of the town of Cody, the seat of Park County, in northwestern Wyoming. Today the Old Trail Town museum is at the center of the community and commemorates the traditions of Western life. Cody first passed through the region in the 1870s. He was so impressed by the development possibilities from irrigation, rich soil, grand scenery, hunting, and proximity to Yellowstone Park that he returned in the mid-1890s to start a town. Streets in the town were named after his associates: Beck, Alger, Rumsey, Bleistein, and Salsbury. The town was incorporated in 1901.

In November 1902, Cody opened the Irma Hotel, named after his daughter. He envisioned a growing number of tourists coming to Cody on the recently opened Burlington rail line. He expected that they would proceed up Cody Road, along the north fork of the Shoshone River, to visit Yellowstone Park. To accommodate travelers, Cody completed the construction of the Wapiti Inn and Pahaska Tepee in 1905 along Cody Road with the assistance of the artist and rancher Abraham Archibald Anderson.

Cody established the TE Ranch, located on the south fork of the Shoshone River about thirty-five miles from Cody. When he acquired the TE property, he stocked it with cattle sent from Nebraska and South Dakota. The new herd carried the TE brand. The late 1890s were relatively prosperous years for the Wild West show, and he bought more land to add to the ranch. He eventually held about eight thousand acres (12 1/2 square miles; 32 square kilometers) of private land for grazing operations and ran about a thousand head of cattle. He operated a dude ranch, pack-horse camping trips, and big-game hunting business at and from the TE Ranch. In his spacious ranch house, he entertained notable guests from Europe and America.

Cody founded the local newspaper, The Cody Enterprise, in 1899 with Col. John Peake.

Cody published his autobiography, The Life and Adventures of Buffalo Bill, in 1879. Another autobiography, The Great West That Was: "Buffalo Bill's" Life Story, was serialized in Hearst's International Magazine from August 1916 to July 1917. and ghostwritten by James J. Montague. It contained several errors, in part because it was completed after Cody's death in January 1917. It was accompanied by illustrations by N. C. Wyeth.

=== Irrigation ===
Larry McMurtry, along with historians such as R. L. Wilson, asserted that at the turn of the 20th century, Cody was the most recognizable celebrity on Earth. While Cody's show brought an appreciation for the Western and American Indian cultures, he saw the American West change dramatically during his life. Bison herds, which had once numbered in the millions, were threatened with extinction. Railroads crossed the plains, barbed wire, and other types of fences divided the land for farmers and ranchers, and the once-threatening Indian tribes were confined to reservations. Wyoming's coal, oil and natural gas were beginning to be exploited toward the end of his life.

The Shoshone River was dammed for hydroelectric power and irrigation. In 1897 and 1899, Cody and his associates acquired from the State of Wyoming the right to take water from the Shoshone River to irrigate about 169,000 acres (680 km^{2}) of land in the Big Horn Basin. They began developing a canal to carry water diverted from the river, but their plans did not include a water storage reservoir. Cody and his associates were unable to raise sufficient capital to complete their plan. Early in 1903, they joined with the Wyoming Board of Land Commissioners in urging the federal government to step in and help with irrigation in the valley.

The Shoshone Project became one of the first federal water development projects undertaken by the newly formed Reclamation Service, later known as the Bureau of Reclamation. After Reclamation took over the project in 1903, investigating engineers recommended constructing a dam on the Shoshone River in the canyon west of Cody. Construction of the Shoshone Dam started in 1905, a year after the Shoshone Project was authorized. When it was completed in 1910, it was the tallest dam in the world. Almost three decades after its construction, the name of the dam and reservoir was changed to Buffalo Bill Dam by an act of Congress.

== Marriage and children ==
Cody married Louisa Frederici on March 6, 1866, just a few days after his twentieth birthday. The couple met when Cody had traveled to St. Louis under his command during the Civil War. Cody's autobiography barely mentioned the courtship to Frederici but declared, "I now adored her above any other young lady I had ever seen." Cody suggested in letters and his autobiography that Frederici had pestered him into marriage, but he was aware that it was "very smart to be engaged." This rhetoric became pushed more and more in his explanations for marriage as the relationship between him and his wife began to decline.

Frederici stayed home with their children. Two of their children died young while the family was living in Rochester, New York. These two and a third child were buried in Mount Hope Cemetery, in Rochester. While his wife and children remained in North Platte, Bill stayed outside the home, hunting, scouting, and building up his acting career in the Wild West show. As Cody began to travel more frequently and to places farther from home, problems over infidelity, real or imagined, began to arise. These concerns grew so great that in 1893, Frederici showed up at his hotel room in Chicago unannounced and was led to "Mr. and Mrs. Cody's suite." Cody mentions in his autobiography that he was "embarrassed by the throng of beautiful ladies" who surrounded him both in the cast and the audiences, and this trend continued as he became involved with more and more actresses who were not afraid to show their attraction to him in front of an audience.

Excerpt from a newspaper in Erie, Colorado, reporting Cody's filing for divorce

Cody filed for divorce in 1904, after 38 years of marriage. His decision was made after years of jealous arguments, bad blood between his wife and his sisters, and friction between the children and their father. By 1891, Cody had instructed his brother-in-law to handle Frederici's affairs and property, saying "I often feel sorry for her. She is a strange woman but I don't mind her – remember she is my wife – and let it go at that. If she gets cranky, just laugh at it, she can't help it." Cody hoped to keep the divorce quiet, to not disrupt his show or his stage persona, but Frederici had other ideas. Filing for divorce was scandalous in the early 20th century when marital unions were seen as binding for life. This furthered Cody's determination to get Frederici to agree to a "quiet legal separation," to avoid "war and publicity." The court records and depositions that were kept with the court case threatened to ruin Cody's respectability and credibility. His private life had not been open to the public before, and the application for divorce brought unwanted attention to the matter. Not only did townspeople feel the need to take sides in the divorce, but headlines rang out with information about Cody's alleged infidelities or Frederici's excesses.

Cody's two main allegations against his wife were that she attempted to poison him on multiple occasions (this allegation was later proved false) and that she made living in North Platte "unbearable and intolerable" for Cody and his guests. The press picked up on the story immediately, creating a battle between Cody and Frederici's teams of lawyers, both of which seemed to be the better authority on Nebraska divorce law. Divorce laws varied from state to state in the early 1900s. Desertion was the main grounds for divorce, but in some jurisdictions, such as Kansas, divorce could be granted if a spouse was "intolerable." The Victorian ideal of marriage did not allow for divorce in any case, but the move westward forced a change in the expectations of husbands and wives and the ability to remain married. In Lewis and Clark County, Montana, 1867 records show that there were more divorces in that year than marriages. Part of the appeal of the frontier was that "a man cannot keep his wife here."

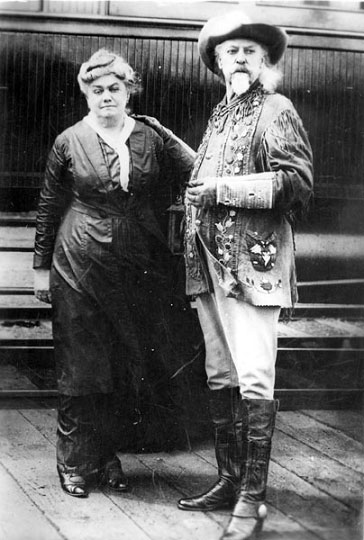
Buffalo Bill and his wife, Louisa

After Cody's announcement that he was suing for divorce, Frederici began to fight back. She claimed that she had never attempted to poison him and that she wished to remain married. The trial then moved to court in February 1905. One of the witnesses who spoke to a newspaper was Mrs. John Boyer, a housekeeper in the Cody home who was married to a man who worked for the Wild West show. She claimed that Frederici acted inhospitably towards Cody's guests and that, when Cody was not at the ranch, she would "feed the men too much and talk violently about Cody and his alleged sweethearts ... and that she was seen putting something into his coffee." Other witnesses mentioned Cody's comment that to handle his wife he had to "get drunk and stay drunk." The battle in court continued, with testimony from three witnesses, Mary Hoover, George Hoover, and M. E. Vroman. After the witnesses had testified, Cody changed his mind about the divorce.

Cody's change of mind was not due to any improvement in his relationship with Frederici but rather was due to the death of their daughter, Arta Louise, in 1904 from "organic trouble." With this weighing heavily on him, Cody sent a telegram to Frederici hoping to put aside "personal differences" for the funeral. Frederici was furious and refused any temporary reconciliation. Cody decided to continue pursuing the divorce, adding to his complaint that Frederici would not sign mortgages and that she had subjected him to "extreme cruelty" in blaming him for the death of Arta. When the trial proceeded a year later, in 1905, both their tempers were still hot. The final ruling was that "incompatibility was not grounds for divorce," so that the couple was to stay legally married. The judge and the public sided with Frederici, the judge deciding that her husband's alleged affairs and his sisters' meddling in his marriage had caused his unhappiness, not his wife. Cody returned to Paris to continue with the Wild West show and attempted to maintain a hospitable, but distant, relationship with his wife. The two reconciled in 1910, after which Frederici often traveled with her husband until he died in 1917.

Bill's daughter, Irma Cody, died in Cody in 1918. She is buried at Riverside Cemetery in Cody, Wyoming.

== Death ==
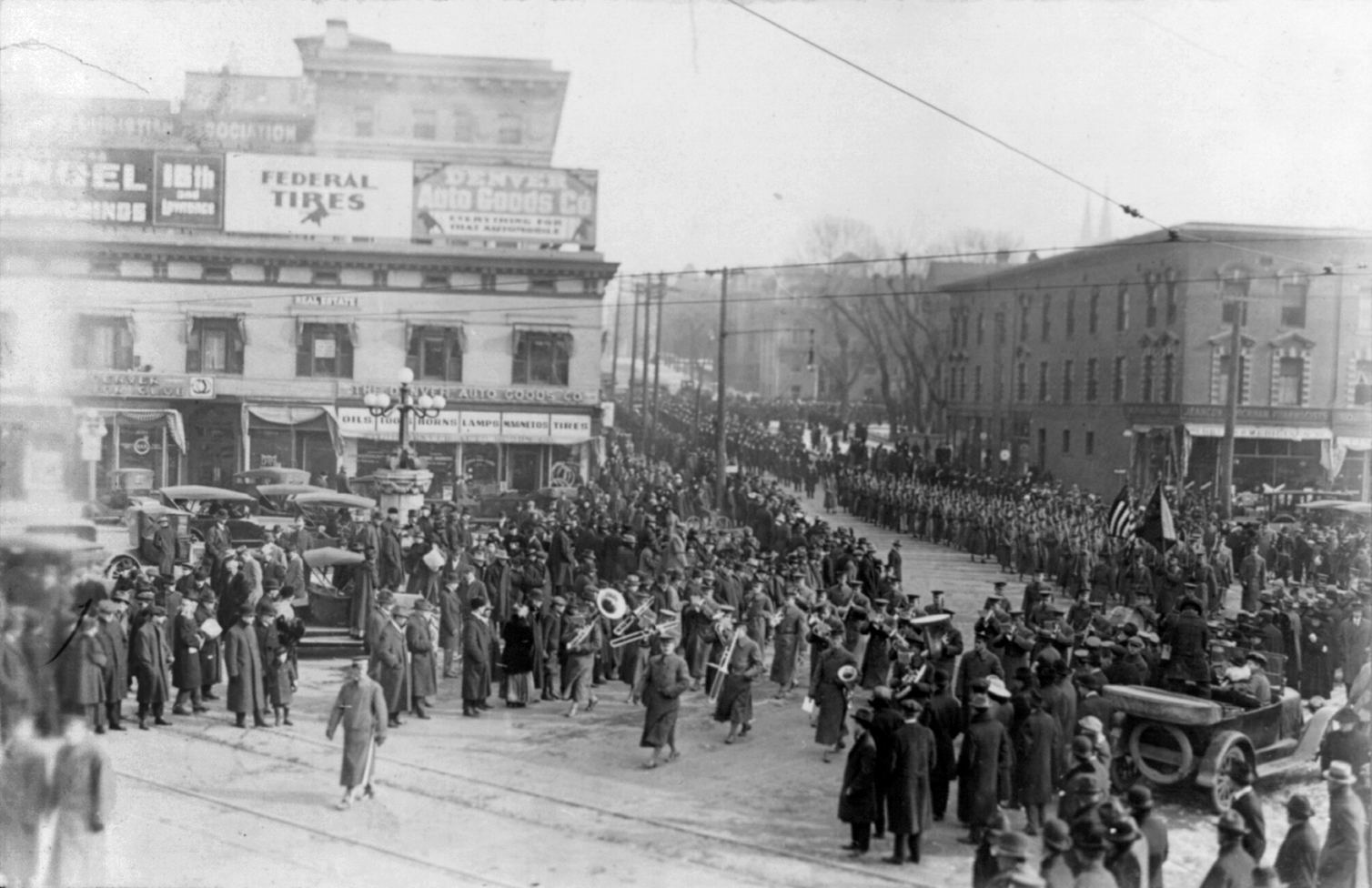
Cody's funeral parade in Denver, Colorado, in 1917

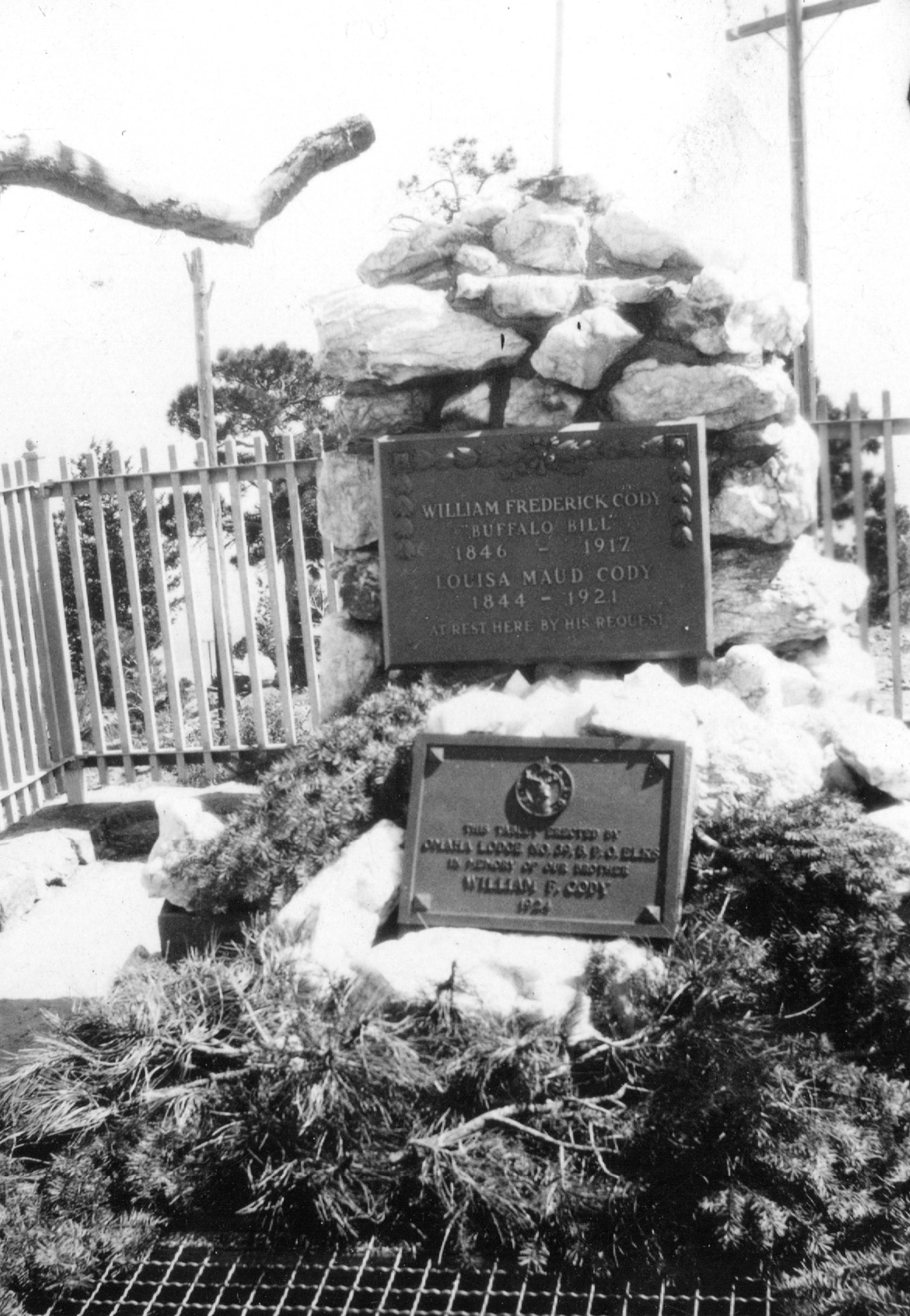
Cody's grave in Golden, Colorado, in 1927

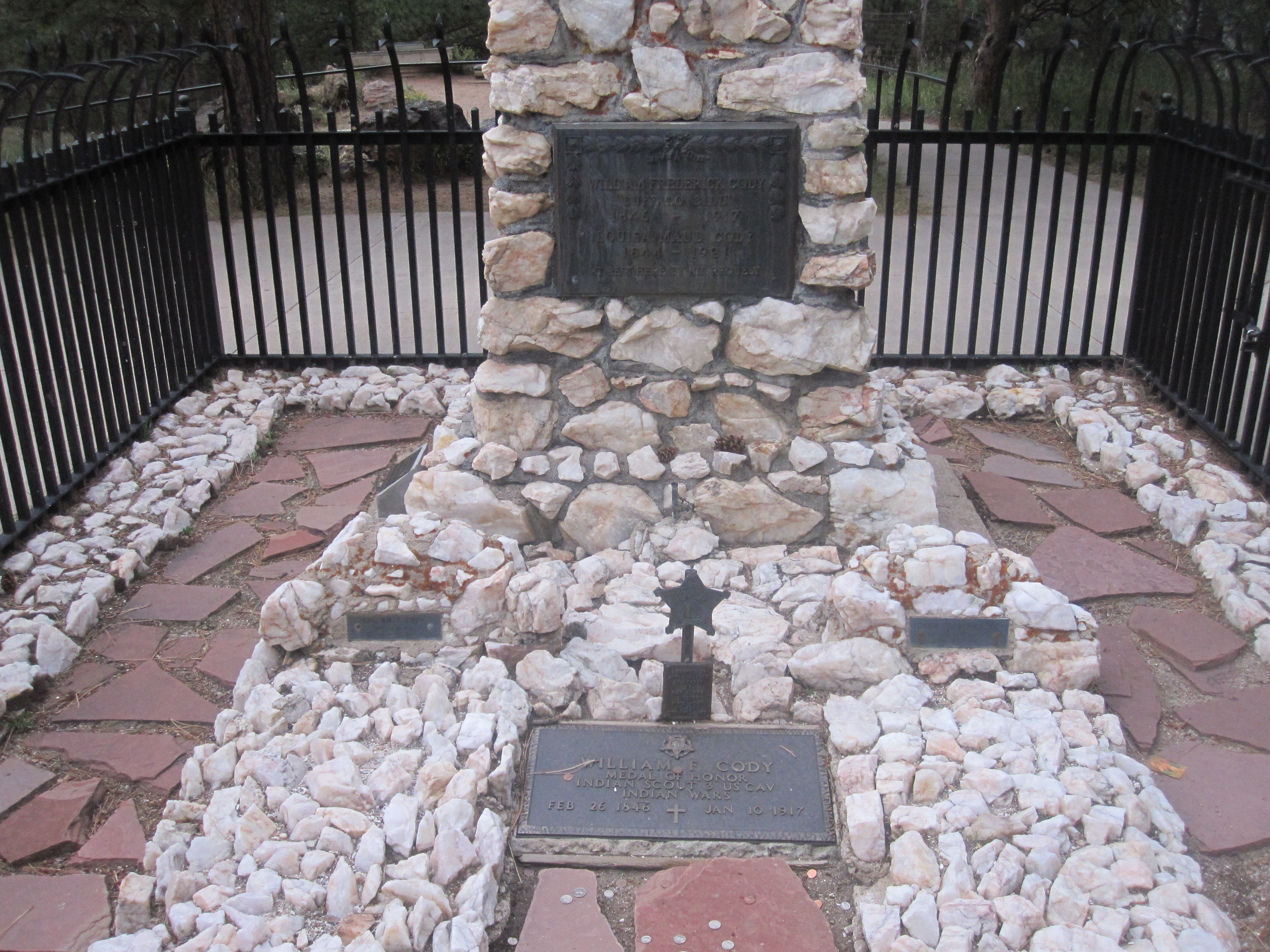
Cody's grave in 2010

Cody died on January 10, 1917. He was baptized in the Catholic Church the day before his death by Father Christopher Walsh of the Cathedral Basilica of the Immaculate Conception. He received a full Masonic funeral. Upon the news of Cody's death, tributes were made by King George V, Kaiser Wilhelm II, and President Woodrow Wilson. His funeral service was held at the Elks Lodge Hall in Denver. The governor of Wyoming, John B. Kendrick, a friend of Cody, led the funeral procession to the cemetery.

At the time of his death, Cody's once-great fortune had dwindled to less than $100,000 (approximately $2,513,000 in 2025). He left his burial arrangements with his wife. She said that he had always said he wanted to be buried on Lookout Mountain, which was corroborated by their daughter Irma, Cody's sisters, and family friends. But other family members joined the people of Cody in saying that he should be buried in the town he founded.

On June 3, 1917, Cody was buried on Lookout Mountain, in Golden, Colorado, west of Denver, on the edge of the Rocky Mountains, overlooking the Great Plains. His burial site was selected by his sister Mary Decker. In 1948, the Cody chapter of the American Legion offered a $10,000 reward (approximately $134,000 in 2025) to anyone who could steal Cody's body and deliver it to Cody, Wyoming. In response, the Denver chapter of the American Legion mounted a guard over the grave. There are still rumors about the true burial place of Buffalo Bill Cody. Although Lookout Mountain has a gravesite behind a fence and under concrete, there are claims that Cody, Wyoming, was the beneficiary of a body swap carried out before he was buried in Colorado and that he was instead laid to rest on top of Cedar Mountain in Cody.

On June 9, 1917, his show was sold to Archer Banker of Salina, Kansas, for $105,000 (approximately $2,639,000 in 2025).

== Philosophy ==
As a frontier scout, Cody respected Native Americans and supported their civil rights. He employed many Native Americans, as he thought his show offered them good pay with a chance to improve their lives. He described them as "the former foe, present friend, the American" and once said, speaking of later events than the original frontier raids, that "every Indian outbreak that I have ever known has resulted from broken promises and broken treaties by the government."

Cody supported the rights of women, voicing support for women's suffrage and equal pay. When asked about the suffrage movement in an interview with Omaha World Herald from June 4, 1894, he said, "I am in favor of women voting. Why not? Women are developing wonderfully just now and can do many things which they couldn't do twenty years ago." In another interview with The Milwaukee Journal from April 16, 1898, he said "Set that down in great big black type that Buffalo Bill favors woman suffrage… These fellows who prate about the women taking their places make me laugh… If a woman can do the same work that a man can do and do it just as well, she should have the same pay." Women such as Annie Oakley and Calamity Jane had legendary roles in his show, and later in life Cody continued to hire and treat women fairly.

In his shows, the Indians were usually depicted attacking stagecoaches and wagon trains and were driven off by cowboys and soldiers. Many family members traveled with the men; Cody encouraged the wives and children of his Native American performers, as part of the show, to set up camp just as they would in their homelands. He wanted the paying public to see the human side of the "fierce warriors".

Cody was known as a conservationist who spoke out against hide-hunting and advocated the establishment of a hunting season.

== Cody as a Freemason ==
Cody was active in the concordant bodies of the fraternal organization of Freemasonry having been initiated in Platte Valley Lodge No. 32, in North Platte, Nebraska, on March 5, 1870. He received his second and third degrees on April 2, 1870, and January 10, 1871, respectively. He became a Knight Templar in 1889 and received his 32nd degree in the Scottish Rite of Freemasonry in 1894.

== Works ==
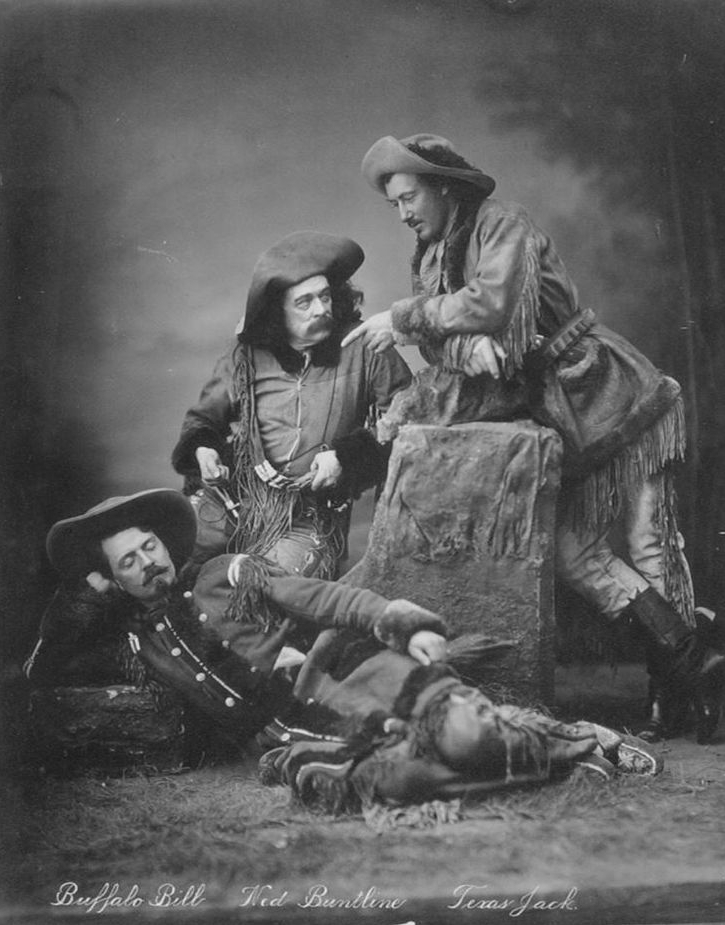
Scouts of the Prairie

- Scouts of the Prairie (1872) play cast
- Scouts of the Plains (1873) by Buffalo Bill Combination troupe
- Red Right Hand (1876)
- The Life Of Honorable William F. Cody (1879)
- Buffalo Bill's Wild West (1883–1913) touring show
- The Wild West in England (1888)
- Buffalo Bill and Escort (1897) film cast
- Cody Enterprise (1899–), Wyoming town newspaper
- Buffalo Bill's Wild West (1900–1903, 1910) films cast
- The Adventures of Buffalo Bill (1904) ISBN 9781977910646
- True Tales of the Plains (1908) ISBN 9781104514747
- Buffalo Bill's Wild West and Pawnee Bill's Far East (1910) film cast
- Col. W.F. Cody (Buffalo Bill) Historical Pictures Company (1913) films production
- The Adventures of Buffalo Bill (1914) film cast
- Indian Wars (1914) film cast
- The Adventures of Buffalo Bill (1917) film cast
- The Buffalo Bill Show (1917) film cast

== Legacy and honors ==
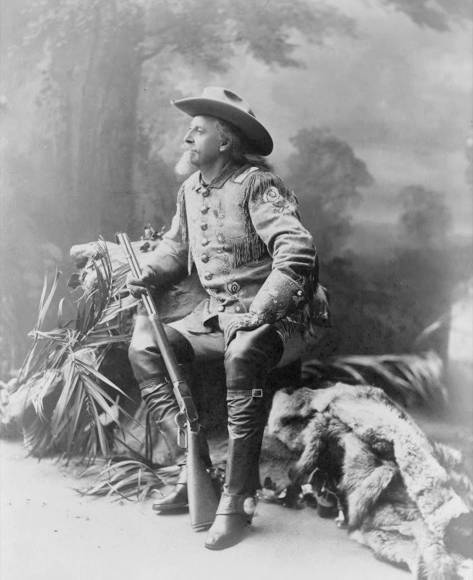
Cody in 1903

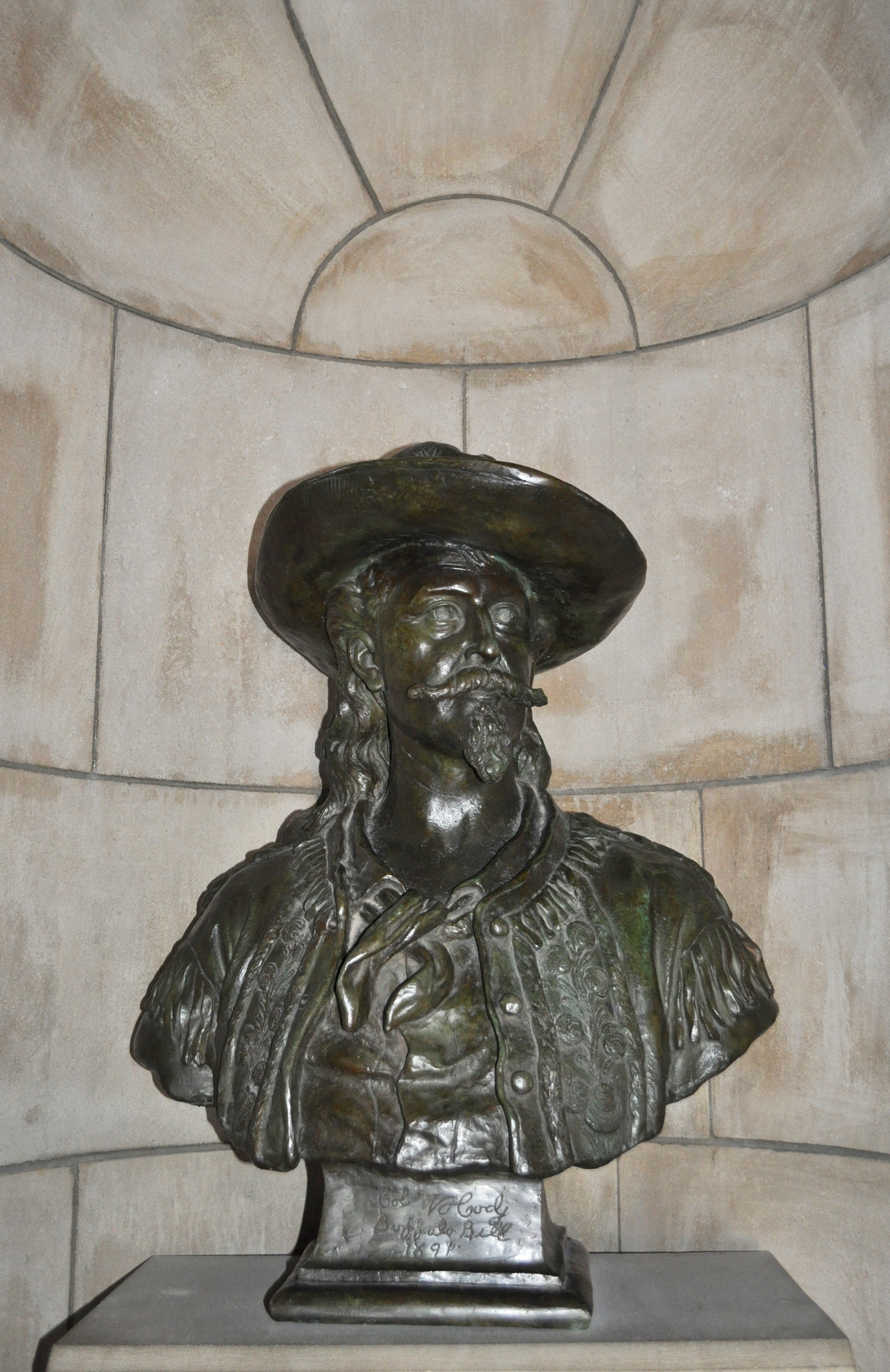
A bust of Cody created by Anton Friedrich Scholl in 1891 for the Nebraska Hall of Fame.

- In 1872, Cody was awarded the Medal of Honor for service as a civilian scout to the 3rd Cavalry Regiment, for "gallantry in action" at Loupe Forke, Platte River, Nebraska. In 1917, after Congress revised the standards for the award, the U.S. Army removed from the rolls 911 medals previously awarded to civilians or for actions that would not warrant a Medal of Honor under the new higher standards. Cody's medal was among those revoked. In 1977, Congress began reviewing numerous cases; it reinstated the medals for Cody and four other civilian scouts on June 12, 1989.
- In 1891, a bust of Cody was created by Anton Friedrich Scholl for the Nebraska Hall of Fame.
- Cody was inducted into the Nebraska Hall of Fame in 1967.
- The Buffalo Bill Cody Scenic Byway through the Shoshone National Forest is a National Forest Scenic Byway and Wyoming Scenic Byway named after Buffalo Bill.
- Because of his funding and planning with The Shoshone Project The Buffalo Bill Dam, The Buffalo Bill Reservoir created by the dam, and the Buffalo Bill State Park at the reservoir are all named after him.
- The Buffalo Bill Ranch State Park, also known as the Scout's Rest Ranch in North Platte, Nebraska was designated as a Nebraska State Historical Park in 1965, and designated a National Historic Landmark in 2021.
- Cody was honored by two U.S. postage stamps. One was a fifteen-cent Great Americans series stamp.
- The Buffalo Bill Center of the West was founded in Cody, Wyoming. The town is named in his honor.

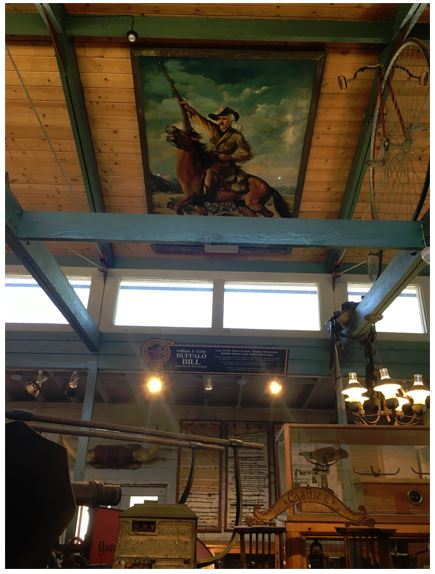
Portrait of Buffalo Bill by Paul von Klieben in the Western Trails Museum at Knott's Berry Farm, Buena Park, California.

- Buffalo Bill's Wild West and the Progressive Image of American Indians is a collaborative project of the Buffalo Bill Historical Center and the history department of the University of Nebraska–Lincoln, with assistance from the Center for Digital Research in the Humanities at the University of Nebraska in Lincoln. This digital history project contains letters, official programs, newspaper reports, posters, and photographs. The project highlights the social and cultural forces that shaped how American Indians were defined, debated, contested, and controlled in this period. This project was based on the Papers of William F. Cody project of the Buffalo Bill Historical Center.
- The National Museum of American History's Photographic History Collection at the Smithsonian Institution preserves and displays Gertrude Käsebier's photographs of the Wild West show. Michelle Delaney has published Buffalo Bill's Wild West Warriors: Photographs by Gertrude Käsebier.
- Some Oglala Lakota people carry on family show business traditions from ancestors who were Carlisle Indian School alumni and worked for Buffalo Bill and other Wild West shows. Several national projects celebrate Wild Westers and Wild Westing. Wild Westers still perform in movies, powwows, pageants, and rodeos.
- The Buffalo Bills, a National Football League team based in Buffalo, New York, were named after the entertainer. Other early football teams (such as the Buffalo Bills of the All-America Football Conference) used the nickname, solely for name recognition, as Cody had no special connection with the city of Buffalo. He did however live for a few years in nearby Rochester. Three of Buffalo Bill's children are buried at Mount Hope Cemetery in Rochester, New York.
- Euro Disneyland Railroad locomotive #1 is named the W. F. Cody in his honor.
- In 1958, he was inducted into the Hall of Great Westerners of the National Cowboy & Western Heritage Museum.
- Bubble O' Bill, an ice cream in the shape of a cowboy currently sold in Australia and previously available in the United States and United Kingdom, is named as such after Cody's stage name.
- Movies about Cody inspired a youth subculture in the Belgian Congo in the 1950s, with young men and women dressing like him and forming neighborhood gangs. After Congolese independence, some of the "Bills" went on to careers in the music industry.

=== Statues ===
- "The Scout" 1924, by Gertrude Vanderbilt Whitney, in Cody, Wyoming
- "Buffalo Bill – Plainsman" 1976, by Bob Scriver, in Cody, Wyoming
- "The Spirit of Cody" 1999 by Jeffery B. Rudolph in Cody, Wyoming
- "Born Under a Wandering Star" by Vic Payne in Cody, Wyoming
- "Howdy Folks" 2000, by Jeffery Rudolph in Golden, Colorado
- "Buffalo Bill Monument" 2004 by Charlie Norton in Oakley, Kansas
- "Buffalo Bill " at the National Cowboy & Western Heritage Museum in Oklahoma City
- "Buffalo Bill Statue" 2006 at Dennistoun in Glasgow
- "America" 1876 by John Bell (sculptor), a section of the Albert Memorial in Hyde Park, London features a western figure that bears a resemblance to Buffalo Bill standing next to an American Bison.

== Representation in popular culture ==
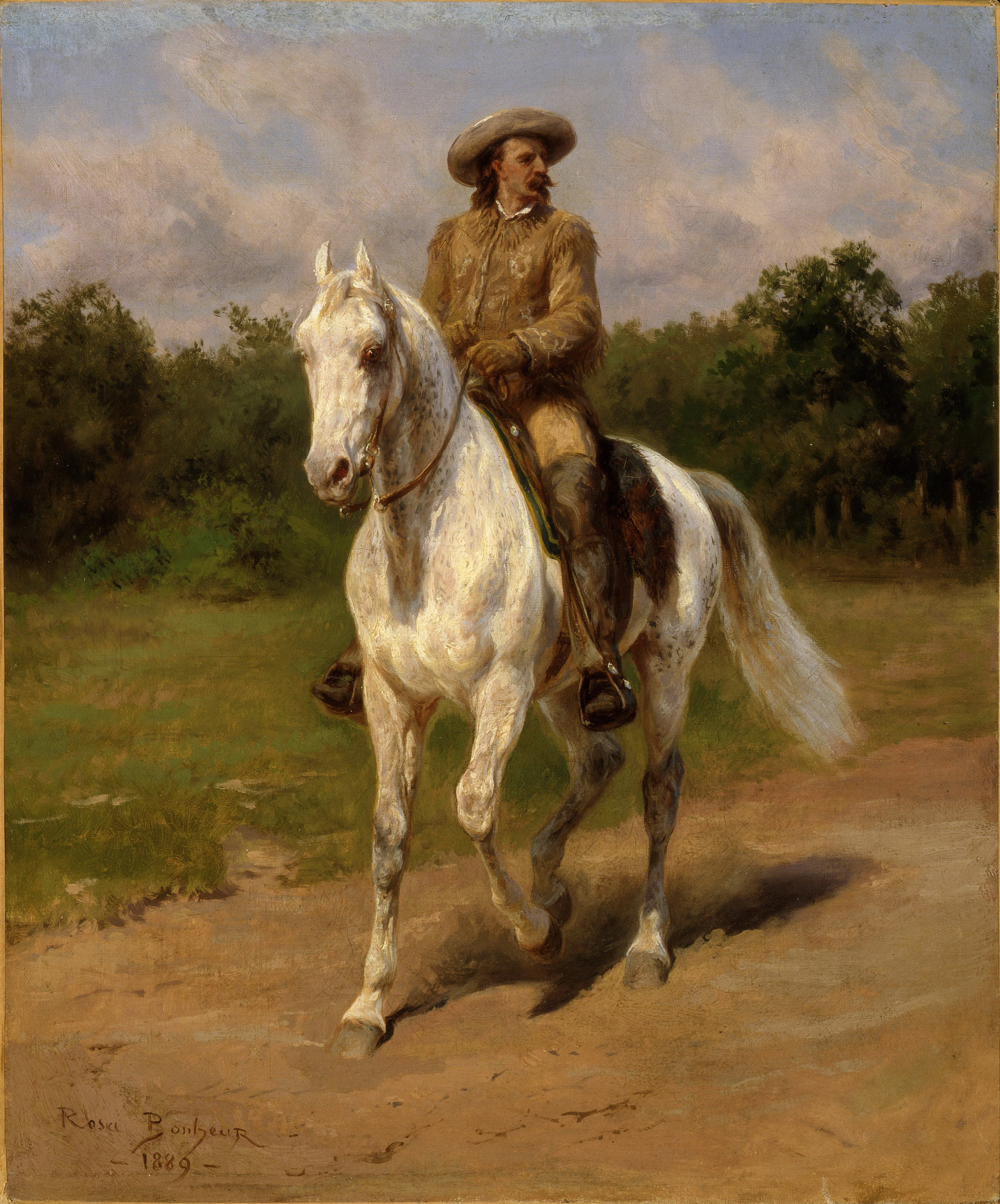
Portrait at Horse of Col. William F. Cody. Painting by Rosa Bonheur, 1889.

Buffalo Bill has been portrayed in many literary, musical, and theatrical works, movies, and television shows, especially during the 1950s and 1960s, when Westerns were most popular. Some examples are listed below.

=== Film ===
- 1926: With Buffalo Bill on the U. P. Trail, starring Roy Stewart as Buffalo Bill
- 1931: Battling with Buffalo Bill, starring Tom Tyler as Buffalo Bill
- 1935: The Miracle Rider, starring Tex Cooper as Buffalo Bill
- 1935: Annie Oakley, starring Moroni Olsen as Buffalo Bill
- 1936: The Plainsman, starring James Ellison as Buffalo Bill.
- 1940: Young Buffalo Bill, starring Roy Rogers as Buffalo Bill
- 1944: Buffalo Bill, starring Joel McCrea as Buffalo Bill
- 1950: Cody of the Pony Express, starring Dickie Moore as Buffalo Bill
- 1950: Annie Get Your Gun, starring Louis Calhern as Buffalo Bill
- 1952: Buffalo Bill in Tomahawk Territory, starring Clayton Moore as Buffalo Bill
- 1953: Pony Express, starring Charlton Heston as Buffalo Bill
- 1954: Riding with Buffalo Bill, starring Marshall Reed as Buffalo Bill
- 1963: The Raiders, starring Jim McMullan as Buffalo Bill
- 1964: Buffalo Bill, Hero of the Far West, starring Gordon Scott as Buffalo Bill
- 1965: Seven Hours of Gunfire, starring Rik Van Nutter as Buffalo Bill
- 1966: The Plainsman, starring Guy Stockwell as Buffalo Bill
- 1974: Don't Touch the White Woman!, starring Michel Piccoli as Buffalo Bill
- 1976: Buffalo Bill and the Indians, or Sitting Bull's History Lesson, is a fictional film by Robert Altman that features the Wild West show, with Paul Newman as Cody and Geraldine Chaplin as Annie Oakley. The film is based on the play "Indians", by Arthur Kopit
- 1979: The Last Ride of the Dalton Gang, starring Buff Brady as Buffalo Bill
- 1981: The Legend of the Lone Ranger, starring Ted Flicker as Buffalo Bill
- 1989–92: The Young Riders, a series with Stephen Baldwin as Cody, with a fictionalized version of his Pony Express riding days
- 1991: In the film adaptation of Thomas Harris's 1988 novel The Silence of the Lambs, serial killer Jame Gumb is nicknamed Buffalo Bill because he "skins his humps".
- 1995: Wild Bill, is a film based on legends about "Wild Bill" Hickok, in which Buffalo Bill briefly appears in the play Scouts of the Plains, with Jeff Bridges as Hickok, Keith Carradine as Cody, and Ellen Barkin as Calamity Jane
- 1995: Buffalo Girls is a TV miniseries based on legends about Calamity Jane, with Peter Coyote as Buffalo Bill, Anjelica Huston as Calamity Jane, Reba McEntire as Annie Oakley, and Russell Means as Chief Sitting Bull
- 2004: Hidalgo is a film based on the legend of Frank Hopkins, featuring the Wild West show, with J. K. Simmons as Buffalo Bill and Elizabeth Berridge as Annie Oakley
- 2025: Heads or Tails?, featuring John C. Reilly as Buffalo Bill

=== Literature ===
- Buffalo Bill Dime novel series
  - 1901–1910: Buffalo Bill Stories – A dime novel publication with 500 issues featuring Buffalo Bill, published by Street & Smith
  - 1912–1919: New Buffalo Bill Weekly – A dime novel publication with about 356 issues featuring Buffalo Bill, published by Street & Smith
  - 1917–1925: Buffalo Bill Border Stories – A dime novel publication with about 211 issues featuring Buffalo Bill, published by Street & Smith
- 1907: A Horse's Tale, by Mark Twain, features Buffalo Bill and his horse.
- 1911: In the thirteenth entry of Leon Sazie's Zigomar series, the fictional detective Nick Carter is Buffalo Bill's cousin, and the two cousins are working under P. T. Barnum at the time of the story.
- 1920: "Buffalo Bill's Defunct" is a poem by E. E. Cummings. In Poetry, edited by J. Hunter, it is entitled "Portrait".
- 1920: "Buffalo Bill's Life Story", published by Cosmopolitan, NY, and illustrated by N.C. Wyeth.
- 1988: In the novel and film The Silence of the Lambs, the serial killer at large is nicknamed Buffalo Bill by the FBI because he "skins his humps".

=== Comics ===
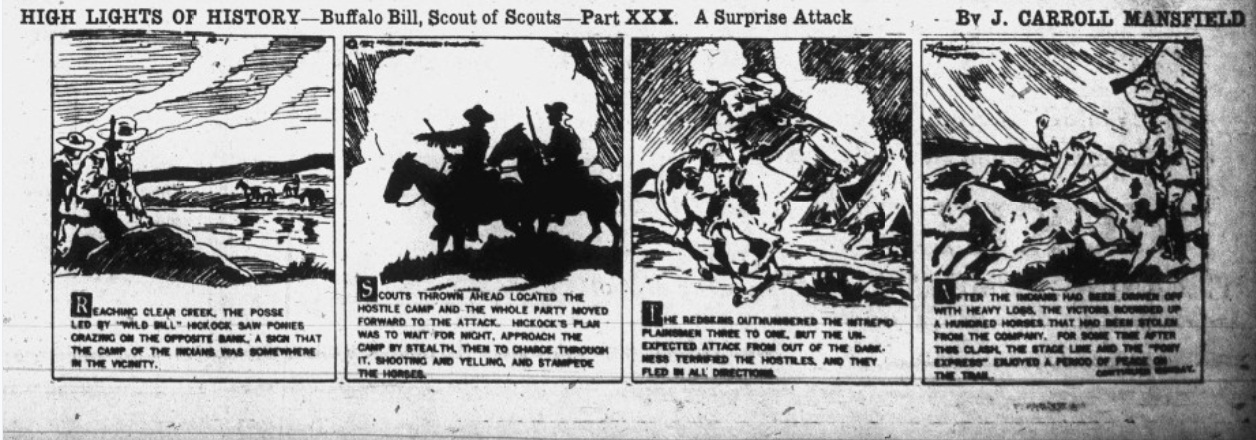
Buffalo Bill, Scout of Scouts, 1 October 1927

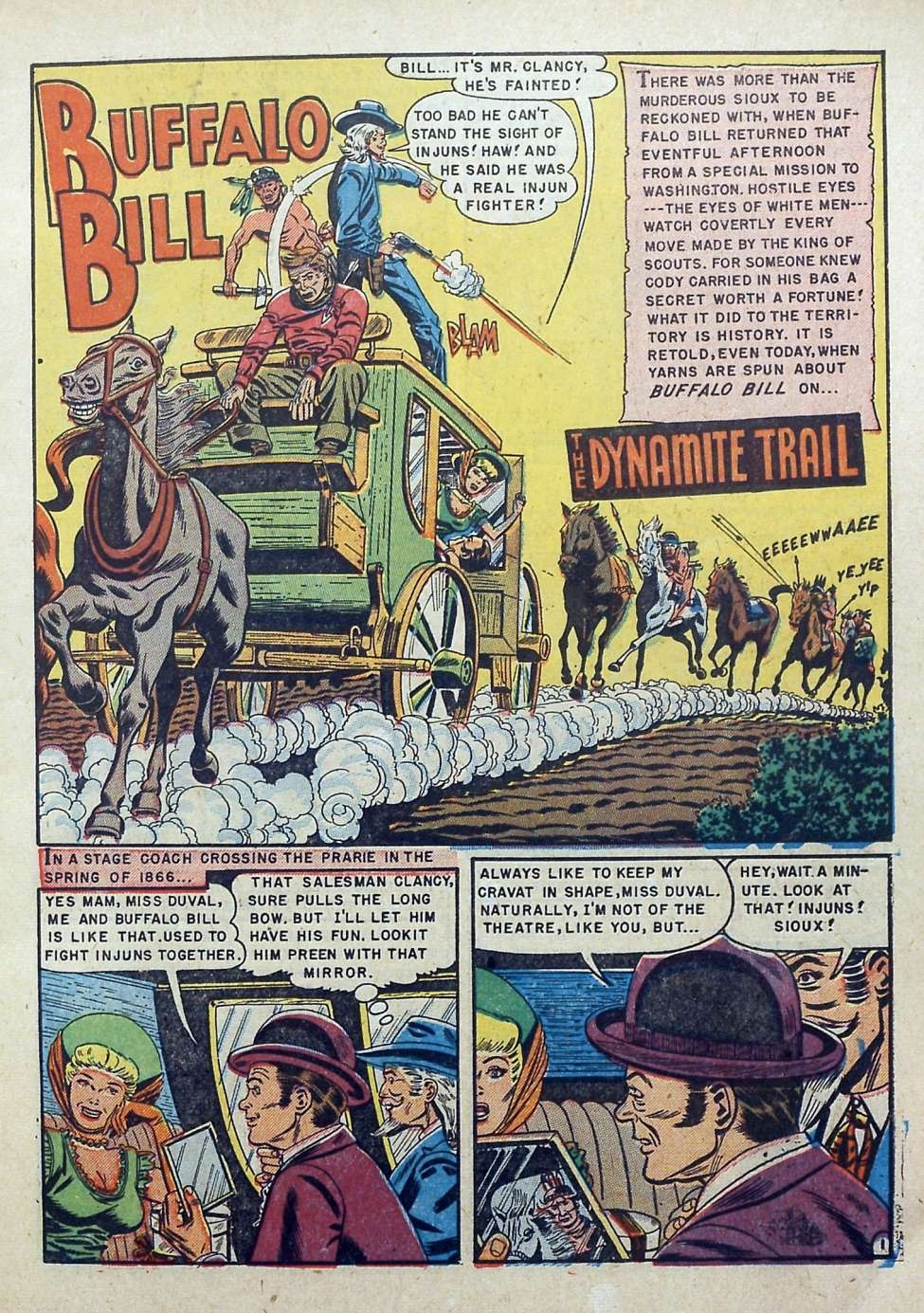
Buffalo Bill #5 (April 1951), Youthful Magazines, art by John Sink

- Buffalo Bill, Scout of Scouts (1927), comic strip by J. Carrol Mansfield
- Buffalo Bill (1950-1955), comic strip by Fred Meagher, United Feature Syndicate
- Buffalo Bill (1950-1951), comic book published by Youthful Magazines

=== Music ===
- The vocal quartet Buffalo Bills was a prominent barbershop quartet in the 1950s and 1960s, formed in Buffalo, New York in 1947, the name inspired by the professional football team which began that year in Buffalo. The group starred in the Broadway and Hollywood versions of Meredith Willson's musical comedy The Music Man.
- The cover art for the 2011 album Goblin, by Tyler, the Creator, features a picture of Buffalo Bill at the age of 19.
- "Bufalo Bill", a song by singer Francesco De Gregori
- "Buffalo Bill", a song by rapper Eminem
- "Buffalo Bill", a song by singer Moxie Raia
- "Buffalo Bill", a song by singer Willi Carlisle
- The Continuing Story of Bungalow Bill, a song by the Beatles
- "Já a můj kůň", a song by Czech pop rock band Chinaski

=== Theater ===
- Buffalo Bill is a character in the 1946 Broadway musical Annie Get Your Gun, in the 1968 play Indians, by Arthur Kopit.
- Since 2016 for select weeks during the summer, nonprofit Rocky Mountain Dance Theatre has produced their original, Wild West Spectacular the Musical, a full-length historical and hysterical musical all about Buffalo Bill and his wild west show showing live at the historic Cody Theatre in downtown Cody, Wyoming, the town he founded: Cody, Wyoming

=== Sports ===
- The Buffalo Bills in the National Football League are named after Buffalo Bill.
- KAA Ghent, a football club, sports the name in its nickname "The Buffalo's".
- Attended a Rangers FC match at Ibrox Stadium in November 1891.

=== Television ===
- Cody was featured as a historical character on such television series about the West as The Life and Legend of Wyatt Earp, Bat Masterson and Bonanza. He has been portrayed as an elder statesman or as a flamboyant, self-serving exhibitionist.
- Cody was portrayed by Britt Lomond in the episode "A Legend of Buffalo Bill" (1959) of the ABC/Warner Brothers Western television series Colt .45.
- Cody was portrayed by John Lupton in a few episodes of Death Valley Days (1959–1962).
- In The Young Riders, a highly fictionalized story of the Pony Express, Cody was portrayed by Stephen Baldwin.
- Buffalo Bill Cody was portrayed by Dennis Weaver in season one of Lonesome Dove: The Series.
- Mister Peabody and Sherman visited Buffalo Bill in episode 59 of "Peabody's Improbable History" titled "Buffalo Bill" on January 9, 1962.
- The photo of Cody and Sitting Bull was used in the titles of The Real West which ran on A&E TV from 1991 to 1994 and later on The History Channel.
- Cody, portrayed by Nicholas Campbell, and his Wild West show are featured in episode 1 of season 2 "Mild Mild West" (February 10, 2009) of the Canadian television period detective series Murdoch Mysteries.
- Cody is prominently featured in Ken Burns PBS documentary The American Buffalo that premiered on October 16, 2023.

== See also ==
- Buffalo Bill Cody Homestead
- Bungalow Bill
- List of Medal of Honor recipients for the Indian Wars
- Ned Buntline
- Pony Express
- Show Indians
- Wild Westing
- William "Doc" Carver
- William Sloan Tough
