= Louisa Frederici =

Wife of Buffalo Bill (1844–1921)

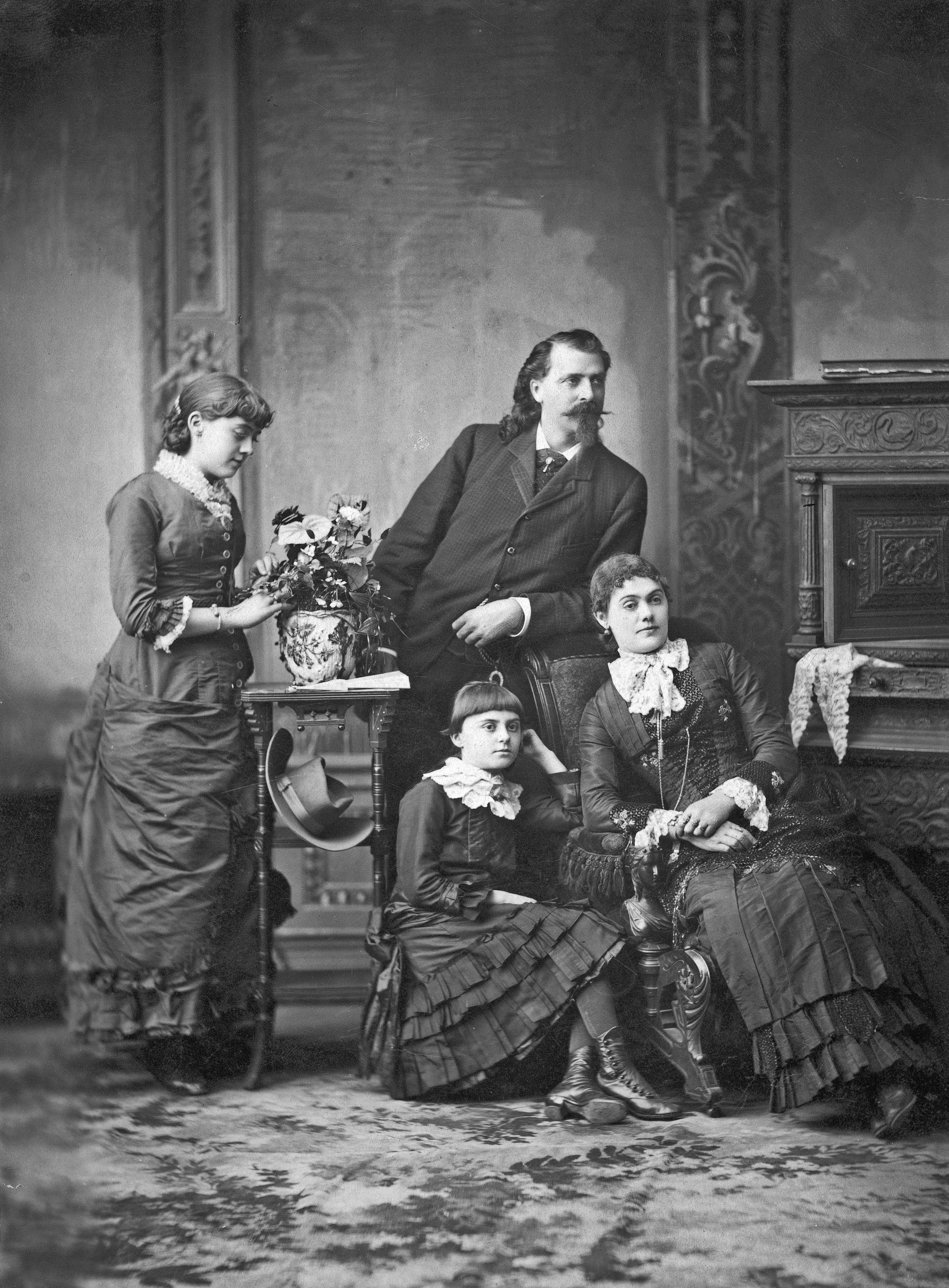
William F. Cody and his wife, Louisa, and their daughters, Arta (touching the vase) and Orra (c. 1882)

Louisa Maud Frederici Cody (May 27, 1844 – October 21, 1921) was the wife of William F. "Buffalo Bill" Cody. She married on March 6, 1866, on her family farm in Arnold, Missouri, and remained in a rocky relationship for 51 years until Cody's death in 1917. The couple had met when Cody traveled to St. Louis due to his Union Army duties at the close of the Civil War. They married soon after, the wedding taking place shortly after their interactions in 1865, with Cody taking time out from scouting and horse-driving to marry Louisa. Louisa, often referred to as "Lulu" by her husband, was a proud woman who would not simply grant Cody a divorce in 1904, which led to trial in 1905. The case was given in Louisa's favor after a judge deemed "incompatibility was not a grounds for divorce."

Louisa and Cody had four children: Arta Lucille (1866–1904), Kit Carson (1870–1876), Orra Maude (1872–1883), and Irma Louise (1883–1918). Louisa would outlive all of her children, with Arta dying shortly before the proceedings of the divorce. Louisa and the children lived separate from Cody as he traveled. Remaining in North Platte, Nebraska, Louisa purchased most of the family's property in her own name. She did this in hopes that if Cody hit a spell of bad financial luck, which he often did, she would be able to provide him with a small fortune. Detailing her life and issues with her husband, Louisa's Memories of Buffalo Bill (c. 1923) shows her devotion to her husband, regardless of his alleged relationships with actresses and women in the Wild West shows.

Louisa loved to sew and often sewed her husband's and children's clothes; this was a result of her training in a convent as a young girl. Noted as always being practical, Louisa is noted by Lottie Kocken (a girl who was part of the Buffalo Bill Excursion in 1878) as being upset when Cody would send her a large bouquet of flowers because "she needed the money more than flowers." Jessie Blackenburg Renyolds also remembered Louisa, commenting that "Willie just couldn't hold onto money, for he was a grand spender, and she has to fix it so he couldn't mortgage everything." When Kit Carson died in 1868, that was believed to have been the final straw for Cody, who was wanting to spend his money and gain the affections of any woman but his wife. Cody filed two divorce petitions, with one newspaper claiming that the cause behind them was Louisa's "nagging." The first filing of divorce was withdrawn due to the death of Orra Cody in 1883. The second went to trial in Cheyenne, Wyoming, in 1905, flooding headlines and tearing communities into the crossfire and demanding they pick sides.

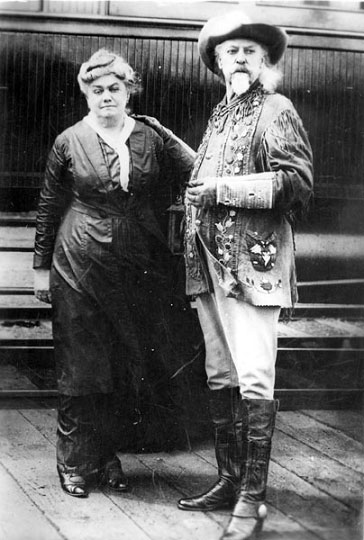
Cody and Louisa.

While the divorce scandal raged on between the two in the courtroom and in the papers, Louisa continued to maintain the house and her living children. When asked to put the suit on hold temporarily in order to attend the funeral of Arta, Louisa refused, demanding that she remain married and the suit be dropped. On March 23, 1905, the district court of Sheridan did not grant Cody his divorce. Louisa then paid her real estate taxes in Lincoln County, Nebraska on 1,200 acres of land and numerous houses assessed under her name and on 700 acres that had been in Cody's name; the result was more than $600, making her one of the largest tax payers in the county. Louisa and Cody reconciled in 1910 and she often attended his Wild West shows until his death in 1917. Louisa died in 1921, and was buried with her husband on Lookout Mountain.
