= 101 Ranch =

101 Ranch may refer to:

- 101 Ranch Boys, American country western band
- Miller Brothers 101 Ranch, a ranch in the Indian Territory of Oklahoma before statehood
- The 101 Ranch, a 1937 book about the Miller Brothers ranch by Ellsworth Collings and Alma Miller England
