= Jones Bros.' Buffalo Ranch Wild West =

Jones Bros Buffalo Ranch Wild West Show, and its successor Kit Carson Buffalo Ranch Wild West Show, was formed from the old Cole Bros. World Toured Shows (1906–1909), owned by Martin Downs. Cole Bros.'s World Tour shows were not associated with the current Cole Bros. Circus or Clyde Beatty Cole Bros. except by name.

== Formation ==
Shortly after the 1909 season, Martin Downs was kicked by a horse, and later died. His show was put on the auction block in early 1910 by Fiss, Doer, and Carroll, New York horse dealers. The Billboard reported that 47 circus men attended the sale, all major shows being represented with the exception of Gollmar Bros. Circus. The largest buyer was J. Augustus Jones, who got a ticket wagon, calliope, bandwagons, chariots, cages, three tableaux, railroad cars, and baggage stock. Other buyers were 101 Ranch, Ringling, Josie DeMott, Bartell Animal Co., Danny Robinson, Frank A. Robbins, Fred Buchanan, Andrew Downie, and Al F. Wheeler etc. W. E. Franklin, and Walter L. Main, but didn't buy anything.

In 1910, J. Augustus Jones operated the Jones Bros. Buffalo Ranch Wild West Show, a 14 car railroad show that traveled on 1 advance, 3 stock, 6 flats, and 4 coaches.

After just one season, Jones decided to sell his show. On December 10, 1910, the Billboard reported that Thomas Wiedemann had purchased from Jones at Pulaski, Tennessee, on November 12, some 29 horses, cars, wagons, etc., and these were shipped to Wiedemann's quarters at Harrisburg, Illinois. On January 7, 1911, the Billboard further reported that Jones had now sold all of his show except two sleepers, the equipment having been purchased by Downie & Wheeler, Masterson Shows, and Thomas Wiedemann.

In 1911, Wiedemann used this equipment to start a Wild West Show called "Kit Carson Buffalo Ranch Wild West Show". This was actually a combination circus and Wild West show, and the performance was presented in a tent rather than the usual canvas canopy and open-air arena type performance used by most Wild West shows. The Kit Carson show had many circus-type acts. For 1911 one train inventory shows a total of 12 cars, 1 advance, 3 stocks, 5 flats, and 3 coaches. Another shows 14 cars, 1 advance, 3 stocks, 6 flats, and 4 coaches. (Both may be right, as it's possible the show enlarged entour.)

In 1912 the Kit Carson show was on 17 cars, 1 advance car, 5 stocks, 5 coaches, and 6 flats. After the 1913 season the show didn't go back to Harrisburg, Ill. quarters but wintered in Birmingham, Alabama, and opened the 1914 season in the South.

== Closure ==
The Kit Carson show had the reputation of being a rough-and-tumble grift outfit, with plenty of "hey rubes" fights when the grifters were working. Some sources say that the strong grift was what finally closed the show. On Friday, October 23, 1914, at Harlan, Kentucky, the show was shot out of town by irate locals, and the next day, the show halted at Barboursville, Kentucky. Creditors had stepped into the picture, closed the show, and had a flyer shipped to the U.S. Printing & Litho. Co. plant at Cincinnati, Ohio, where it was advertised for auction. The stock was sold in December 1911, and March 20, 1915, was the time set for the sale of other properties at Cincinnati, except 5 cars and 12 wagons that were still stored at Harrisburg, but these were to be sold by description at the auction.

The Kit Carson property at the sale went for very low prices. The Billboard states that the Dodson Carnival got the calliope (which may have been the instrument only) pole wagon, stagecoach, 4 baggage wagons, blacksmith wagon, two tableaux, 1 stringer wagon, and a bandwagon. J. A. Jones, Harry Hill (Wild West), and Rice & Dore got other equipment. The report also goes on to say that "outsiders" got among other things, the ticket wagon, and one tableaux wagon.

== See also ==
- List of Wild West shows
