= List of Wild West shows =

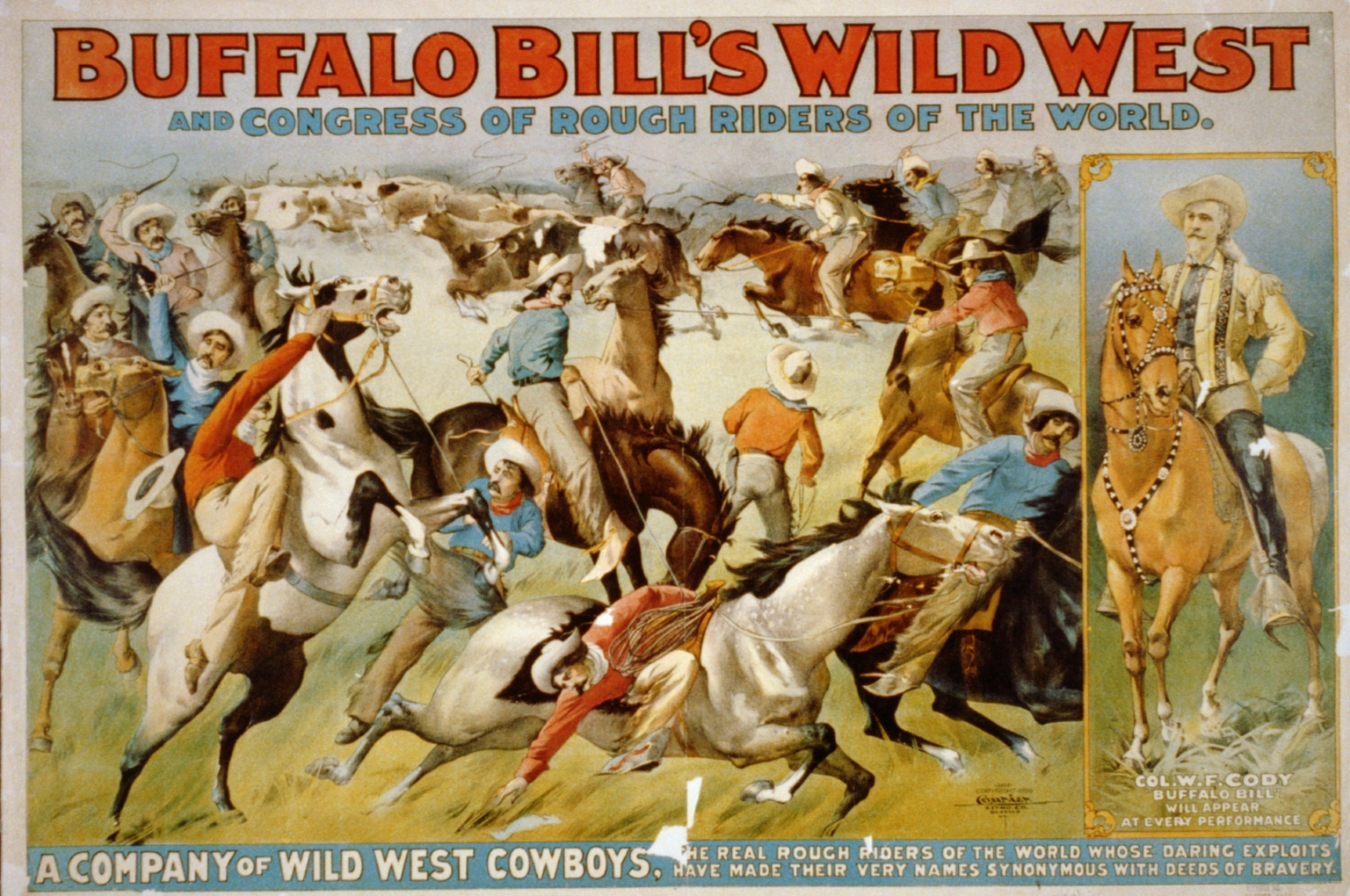
Buffalo Bill's Wild West

The following is a list of Wild West shows:

- Allen Bros. Wild West (1929–1934) – Charles and Mert H. Allen
- Arlington & Beckman's Oklahoma Ranch Wild West (1913) – Edward Arlington and Fred Beckman
- A. S. Lewis Big Shows (1910)
- Austin Bros. 3 Ring Circus and Real Wild West (1945)
- Barrett Shows and Oklahoma Bill's Wild West (1920)
- Bee Ho Gray's Wild West (circa 1919–1932)
- Booger Red's Wild West Show (1904–1910)
- Broncho John, Famous Western Horseman and his Corps of Expert Horsemen (1906) – J. H. Sullivan
- Buckskin Ben's Wild West and Dog and Pony Show (1908) Benjamin Stalker
- Buckskin Bill's Wild West (1900)
- Bud Atkinson's Circus and Wild West (early 1900s) – Toured Australia in 1912
- Buffalo Bill's Wild West and Congress of Rough Riders (1883-1916)
- California Frank's All-Star Wild West (1911) – Frank Hafley
- Captain Jack King's Wild West show
- Colonel Cummins' Wild West Indian Congress and Rough Riders of the World – Frederick T. Cummins
- Congress of Rough Riders and Ropers|Zach Mulhall's Congress of Rough Riders and Ropers
- Diamond Dick's Congress of World's Western Champions
- Dr. Carver's Wild West Show
- Drumhellers Wild West Productions
- Forepaugh & The Wild West (1865-1890)
- Fred Akins Real Wild West and Far East Show (1909–1910)
- Gene Autry's Flying A Ranch Stampede (1942)
- Hardwick's "Great Rocky Mountain Wild West Show" (1884)
- Irwin & Hirsig Wild West (1910)
- Irwin Brothers Cheyenne Frontier Days Wild West Show (1913–1917)
- Jack King's Wild West Rodeo
- Jones Bros.' Buffalo Ranch Wild West (1910)
- L. O. Hillman's Wild West Aggregation]] (1900–1920)
- Miller Bros. 101 Ranch Real Wild West (1907–1916 & 1925–1931)
- Pate Boone Wild West Show
- Pawnee Bill's Wild West Show
- Poe's Wild West Show (1913–1915)
- Texas Jack's Wild West (1901–1905)
- Texas Jay Davis & Sons Wild West Rodeo (1930s, 1940s)
- Young Buffalo Wild West Annie Oakley and Chief Red Shirt

Most Wild West shows did not include the word "show" in their name since the term indicated that the performers were simply acting. Terms like "exposition" or "exhibition" were commonly used to indicate that the spectacles were authentic ethnographic examples of people from the true Wild West. Many of the performers were cowboys and Native Americans who had been involved in legendary battles and historic events before seeing their way of life change dramatically with the settlement of the American frontier.

== Bibliography ==
- Russell, Don, The Wild West: A History of the Wild West Shows, Fort Worth: Amon Carter Museum of Western Art, 1970.
