= Bee Ho Gray =

American banjoist, actor and circus performer (1885–1951)

Publicity photo for Bee Ho Gray – Champion Roper of the World, 1913–1915.

Bee Ho Gray (born Emberry Cannon Gray; April 7, 1885, in Leon, Chickasaw Nation, Indian Territory – August 3, 1951, in Pueblo, Colorado) was a Western performer who spent 50 years displaying his skills in Wild West shows, vaudeville, circus, silent films, and radio. While he was primarily known as an expert at trick roping, he was also skilled with knife throwing, bullwhips (specifically the Australian black snake whip), trick riding, and the banjo. He wove all of these skills together in a homely comic routine. Throughout his long career, he was constantly compared to Will Rogers, which was befitting, considering the two performers worked together several times and developed their acts together in the early 1900s.

== Biography ==
Emberry Cannon Gray was born on April 7, 1885, in Leon, Chickasaw Nation, Indian Territory, in what is present-day Oklahoma. His family moved to the small town of Cache (near Fort Sill), Indian Territory, within two years of his birth. Bee Ho's mother was one-quarter Chickasaw; his father had been a Texas Ranger in the Trinity Division, and later served in the Confederate Army.

Gray grew up among the Apache, Comanche, and Kiowa, as Cache was the commercial center of their territories. His brothers and he played with the children of Comanche Chief Quanah Parker, and his parents became good friends with the Parker family. By the time Emberry was five years old, he began going by the name "Bee Ho", a name meaning "Brother of the Cripple" given to him by Chief Quanah, because Bee Ho's brother, "Ho" Emmet Gray, was stricken with polio as a small boy and walked with a crutch for the remainder of his life.

Bee Ho developed his Western skills on the plains of Indian Territory, but had never seen a real trick roper until about 1900. Bee Ho and his younger brother, Weaver, heard about the amazing tricks that were being performed by trick ropers in Wild West shows. Together, they rode 60 miles on one horse to the town of Chickasha to see the Pawnee Bill Wild West exhibition, making the trip in two days. They were very impressed with the trick ropers and began teaching themselves rope tricks, using clothesline and anything else they could spin. Within a few years, both were performing with Wild West shows. Both brothers enjoyed amazing 50-year careers in Western performance.

During the early years of his career as a Western performer, Bee Ho performed with several Wild West shows. His first notable performances were with Colonel Cummins' Wild West Indian Congress and Rough Riders of the World at the 1904 Louisiana Purchase Exposition, also known as the Saint Louis World's Fair. Other notable performers from this show include Geronimo, Will Rogers, Zach Mulhall, Lucille Mulhall, and a number of well-known Native American chiefs.

Bee Ho joined the Miller Brothers 101 Ranch Real Wild West in 1907, its first year of touring the United States. Other famous people who performed with the 101 Ranch include Tom Mix, Ken Maynard, Hoot Gibson, Buck Jones, Tex McLeod, Chester Byers, Iron Tail, "Buckskin Bessie" Herberg, Bill Pickett, "Buffalo Bill" Cody, Milt Hinkle, Billy Lorette, Luka Chkhartishvili (Prince Lucca), Art Acord, and Princess Wenona (Lillian Smith). While Will Rogers was never actually employed by the 101 Ranch, he spent a lot of time there visiting with friends and taking part in the informal roping contests and other events. Bee Ho and his wife, Broadway actress, equestrienne, and horse trainer Ada Sommerville, traveled with the 101 Ranch for most of the years 1907–1916, with occasional departures to perform with other shows and to compete in early rodeos. The Miller Brothers 101 Ranch Real Wild West toured from 1907 to 1916 and again from 1925 to 1931.

Some of the many other shows with which Bee Ho performed include California Frank's All-Star Wild West (Frank Hafley), Irwin Brothers Cheyenne Frontier Days Wild West Show, Diamond Dick's Wild West, Barnum and Bailey Circus, Ringling Brothers Circus, Shrine Circus, and his own show, Bee Ho Gray's Wild West.

Bee Ho learned the sign language and spoken language of various Native American tribes while growing up in Indian Territory. In about 1912, Bee Ho accompanied Sioux Chief Iron Tail to Washington, DC and New York, where Iron Tail modeled for sculptor James Earle Fraser as he worked on designs for the new buffalo nickel. The two men had been working together on Wild West shows prior to this time and Bee Ho traveled with Iron Tail to act as an interpreter and guide.

Bee Ho won the World Champion Trick and Fancy Roper title at Guy Weadick's Winnipeg Stampede in 1913 when he displayed a rope catch that had never been seen before. The trick was called the "Three-Rope Catch" and involved catching a galloping horse and rider with three ropes – (1) around the rider's torso, (2) around the horse's neck, and (3) all four legs of the horse. Bee Ho won the title from Tex McLeod and held it until 1916, when he lost it to Chester Byers. Bee Ho was the only person who could do the trick for several years. He later taught it to Will Rogers, who performed it in the 1922 silent film The Ropin' Fool. Bee Ho earned the championship again in the early 1920s when he competed at the Cheyenne Frontier Days and Pendleton Round-Up.

Bee Ho Gray moved out of competitive roping by the mid-1920s to focus on his vaudeville and film career.

Bee Ho Gray throwing knives at Erich von Stroheim on the set of Greed

Bee Ho and Ada spent many years as Vaudeville performers with the B. F. Keith, Orpheum, and Western circuits. The show consisted of a comic banter that was delivered while performing intricate rope tricks, knife throwing, whip cracking, banjo, and horse dancing. Their show usually received top billing and was sought after across the country. The couple traveled to Europe to perform on several occasions. They maintained a packed schedule of performances and literally played thousands of venues and shows during their career.

Bee Ho performed in Erich von Stroheim's Greed (film) in 1924. Though his performance was apparently cut from the film when the length was reduced by about 80%, his name still shows up on lists of actors who were in the film, but one of his feats of skill still appears in the film. During an argument between the two main characters (McTeague and Marcus), a knife is thrown and sticks into the wall next to the lead actor's face. According to a 1926 Cedar Rapids (Iowa) Republican newspaper article, "Erich von Storheim [sic] featured Gray in his famous picture, Greed because of his ability to throw a knife."

Bee Ho also performed in a number of more obscure early Western films from the Miller Brothers 101 Ranch Bison Films, Monogram Pictures, and the Vitaphone Corporation, including Hey! Hey! Westerner.

In May and June 1922, Bee Ho and Ada Sommerville were featured in a Broadway musical called Red Pepper, which appeared at the Shubert Theatre. The stars of the show were the minstrel duo James McIntyre and Thomas Kurton Heath. The show then went on the road for one year, closing in North Dakota in June 1923.

Bee Ho added a trained coyote named "Chink" to be part of his act in the early 1930s, and began making radio appearances with his witty Oklahoma comedy. He appeared on stage and on the radio with personalities such as Bing Crosby, Will Rogers, Fred Stone, Joe E. Brown (comedian), Mary Beth Hughes, Eddie Nugent, Tom Mix, Hoot Gibson, Ken Maynard, and many others. Many of the Western stars who performed in the first half of the 1900s got their start with him at the Miller Brothers 101 Ranch Wild West as they saw their way of life on the open range disappearing.

Ada Sommerville died in 1940 at the age of 68. Bee Ho continued with his act using other assistants to fill her role, but the days of vaudeville were over and his career was relegated to county fairs, small corporate events, and school benefits. During his career, Bee Ho gave command performances for at least four United States presidents, members of European royalty, and many diplomats and notables. He died in Pueblo, Colorado, on August 3, 1951, at the age of 66 while visiting his sister. Many of his fans, friends, and family members never knew what became of him.

== See also ==
List of Wild West shows
