= The 101 Ranch =

1937 book by Ellisworth Collings

- Author: Ellsworth Collings; Alma Miller England
- Language: English
- Genre: History
- Publisher: Norman
- Publication date: 1937
- Publication place: United States
- Media type: Print
- Pages: 249
- ISBN: 0-8061-1047-3

The 101 Ranch written by Ellsworth Collings in collaboration with Alma Miller England, narrates the history of the famed Miller Brothers 101 Ranch, the Miller Brothers 101 Ranch Wild West Show, and the Miller family who founded and operated both the ranch and the show. The 101 Ranch Wild West Show was one of the last of the large Wild West shows. The history spans from 1841, Col. George Washington Miller Jr.'s birth, until 1936, when the last piece of property was auctioned off following the economic downturn of 1929. At its height, the ranch encompassed more than 110,000 acres (450 km^{2}) in parts of Noble, Pawnee, Osage, and Kay counties in north central Oklahoma. The appendices list the legal description of the land owned by the ranch as well as its Indian leases. The book contains some 53 photographs depicting the family, the work on the ranch, the Wild West show, as well as the many cowboys, noted visitors, and many Indians employed or living on the ranch.

The book was first published in 1937. Its current edition was published in 1971 by the University of Oklahoma Press and is still in print (paperback edition ISBN 0-8061-1047-3). The 1971 edition contains several photographs from the Western History Collections, University of Oklahoma not appearing in the original.
