= Lillian Smith (trick shooter) =

American trick shooter

Lillian Frances Smith
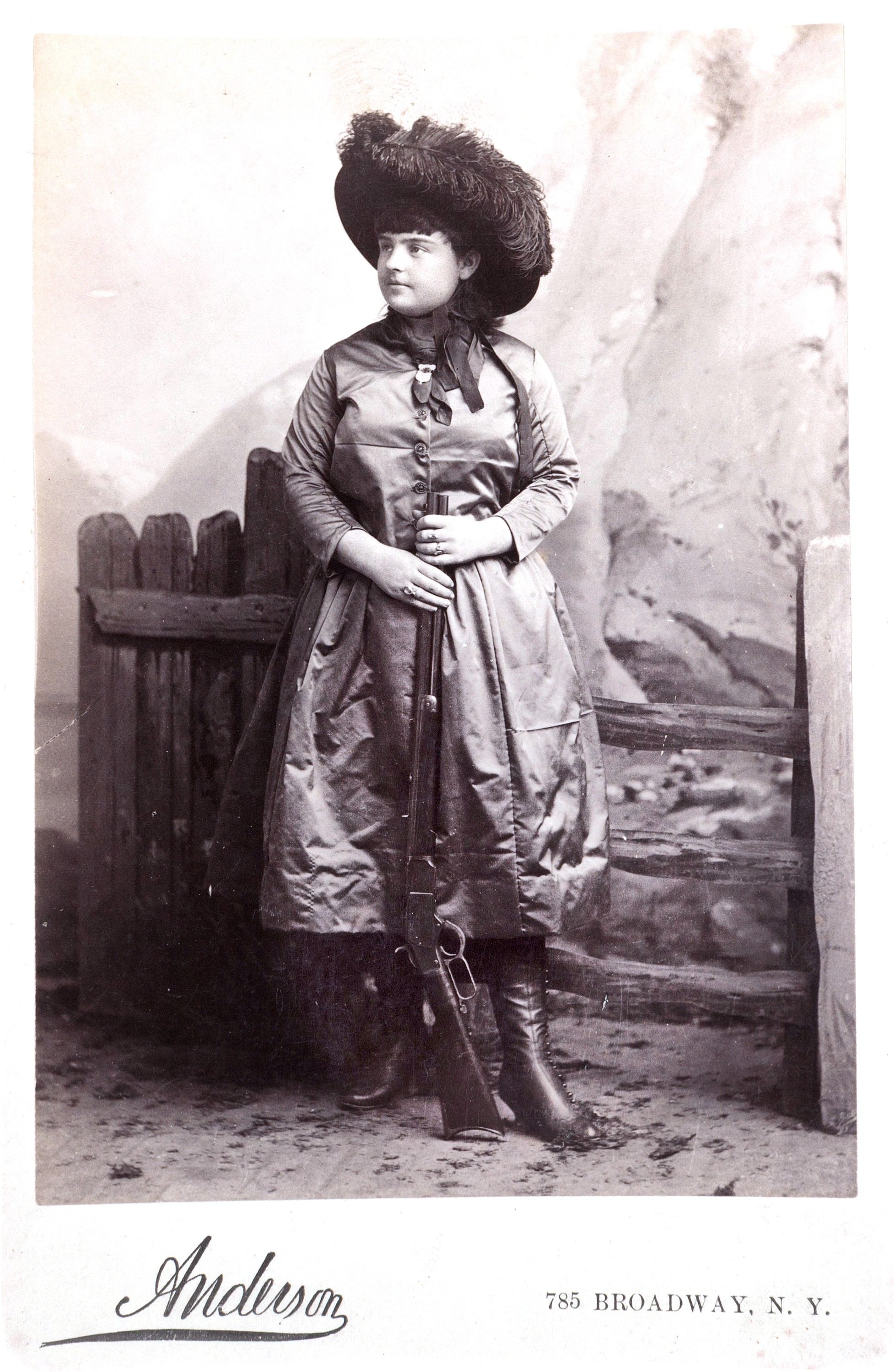
- Smith, 1886
- Born: August 4, 1871 (Note: Although Smith's headstone has her birthdate being February 3, 1871, it is most likely incorrect and placed there for posthumous flair as it gives the coincidence of death being on her 59th birthday. One source has Smith possibly born in August 1871 or 1872 depending on newspapers. Other sources have her being born in the autumn months of 1871, including one from Buffalo Bill's Wild West Company. According to a recently released biography on Smith by author Julia Bricklin, she was born on August 4, 1871, which would coincide with the time period of the previously mentioned sources.); Coleville, California, U.S.
- Died: February 3, 1930 (aged 58); Ponca City, Oklahoma, U.S.
- Resting place: Odd Fellows Cemetery, Ponca City
- Other name: Princess Wenona
- Occupations: trick shooter and trick rider
- Years active: 1881–1920
- Spouses: James "Jim Kid" Willoughby (m. 1886; div. 1889); Theodore Powell (m. 1897; div. 1898); Charles Franklin Hafley (m. 1899; div. 1908); Wayne A. Beasley (m. 1912; div. 1913)
- Partner: Emil W. Lenders (1914–1926)

Lillian Frances Smith (August 4, 1871 – February 3, 1930) was an American trick shooter and trick rider who joined Buffalo Bill's Wild West in 1886, at the age of fourteen. She was billed as "the champion California huntress," and was a direct rival to Annie Oakley in the show.

== Biography ==
Lillian Frances Smith was born on August 4, 1871 in Coleville, California to Levi Woodbury Smith, Jr. and Rebecca T. Robinson, the third of four children. Her parents were originally from Massachusetts and moved to Coleville in 1867. Smith began shooting at the age of 7 and was competing at 10. In 1886, at the age of 15, she joined Buffalo Bill's Wild West show, where she met her rival, Annie Oakley. They were never on friendly terms; Smith was a braggart and at one point declared "Annie Oakley was done for." Moreover, in contrast to Oakley, who was an extremely conservative dresser, Smith enjoyed flashy clothing and had a reputation as a "shameless flirt." Both Smith and Oakley traveled to Great Britain with the Wild West show and met Queen Victoria in 1887. Smith's poor performance at the annual Wimbledon rifle competition (as opposed to Oakley's favorable performance) brought mocking coverage by both the British and American press. A friend of Smith attempted to reverse the roles of Smith and Oakley in his recounting of the competition, but the claims received public responses by reputable sources. Smith left the show in 1889, as Oakley returned.

In 1907, Smith moved permanently to Oklahoma and became a fixture with the Miller Brothers 101 Ranch Wild West Show, performing as "Princess Wenona", a fictionalized Sioux princess. However, she continued to perform in other shows like Pawnee Bill's. After another 13 years as a record-setting sharpshooter and performer, Smith retired around 1920 and died in 1930 in Ponca City, Oklahoma, the home town of the 101 Ranch. She is buried at Odd Fellows Cemetery in Ponca City. Her grave was unmarked until a monumental headstone was placed there in 1999 by the 101 Ranch Old Timers Association. Another source mentions there was a small headstone with the name "P. Wenona" buried under the grass over time since her interment.

Smith was in at least four relationships throughout her life. She was formally married to James "Jim Kid" Willoughby and had common-law relationships with her other three husbands. The order of her husbands has differed between sources. All of her marriages ended in divorce. She did not have any children.

== See also ==
- Calamity Jane
- Wild West shows
