= C. B. Irwin =

Wild West show organizer and rodeo promotor

Charles Burton "C. B." Irwin
- C.B. Irwin in 1923
- Born: August 14, 1875; Chillicothe, Missouri, US
- Died: 1934 (aged 57–59); Cheyenne, Wyoming, US
- Occupations: Wild West shows entrepreneur rancher blacksmith rodeo organizer
- Spouse: Etta McGuckin Irwin
- Children: four biological, 17 adopted

Charles Burton Irwin, professionally known as C. B. Irwin, was a Wild West show organizer, rodeo promotor and contractor, champion steer roper, blacksmith, rancher, and livestock agent. He was a co-founder of the Irwin Bros. Wild West Show. He has been inducted into Cheyenne Frontier Days Old West Museum, the National Rodeo Hall of Fame, and the ProRodeo Hall of Fame.

== Biography ==
Poster for Fall Round-Up on the Y-6 Ranch (1911).

Born in Chillicothe, Missouri, Irwin was the son of a blacksmith. His date of birth is unclear, as it has been listed as August 14, 1875 and August 16, 1877

Irwin and his wife, Etta, traveled to Colorado before settling in Cheyenne, Wyoming, in the early 1900s.

He left to work for a packing plant in Omaha, Nebraska, that supplied beef to Native Americans at the Standing Rock Agency at Fort Yates, North Dakota. He returned to Cheyenne a year later and found work as a blacksmith. Irwin was employed as a cowboy on the L-5 Ranch, and later worked for Francis E. Warren. He also became a livestock agent for the Union Pacific Railroad.

Irwin's older brother, William, acquired homesteads that totaled a combined 80,000 acres, and the resulting ranch was dubbed the N Bar V Ranch in Horse Creek, Wyoming. Under the Homestead Acts, Irwin bought up parcels of land to create his own ranch: the Y-6. His livestock eventually included 300 horses and 300 Mexican steers.

In 1909, the family incorporated the Irwin Brothers Live Stock Company, later changing the name to the Irwin Live Stock and Show Company.

=== Rodeo and showbusiness career ===
Irwin won the Cheyenne Frontier Days steer roping championship in 1900 and 1906. He and his brother, Frank, started the Irwin Bros. Wild West Show, which ran from 1913 to 1917. At its largest, the show included fifty Oglala Lakota, Irwin's children, and a cast of cowboys and cowgirls. The show traveled in up to 28 railroad cars.

Irwin closed the Wild West show after the untimely death of his son, Floyd. However, he continued to conduct rodeos for 10 more years.

In 1912, Irwin created the Cheyenne Feature Film Company, with the goal of making films about Cheyenne Frontier Days and Western films. Only one or two films are known to have been produced.

== Personal life ==
Irwin and his wife, Etta McGuckin Irwin, had four biological children (three daughters and a son), and they adopted 17 children who were acquired to work on the ranch. Irwin's daughter, Joella, was a skilled horsewoman, and was praised by Teddy Roosevelt as the finest horsewoman he had ever met. His only biological son, Floyd, was killed at age 32 when he fell from his horse and suffered a skull fracture.

Irwin was friends with American frontier gunman Tom Horn, and Frank Irwin purportedly sang for Horn before he was hung for murder in 1903.

Irwin died in 1934 in an automobile accident north of Cheyenne.

== Filmography ==
- Fall Round-Up on the Y-6 Ranch (1911), Cheyenne Feature Film Company
