= Miller Brothers 101 Ranch =

- 101 Ranch Historic District
- U.S. National Register of Historic Places
- U.S. National Historic Landmark District
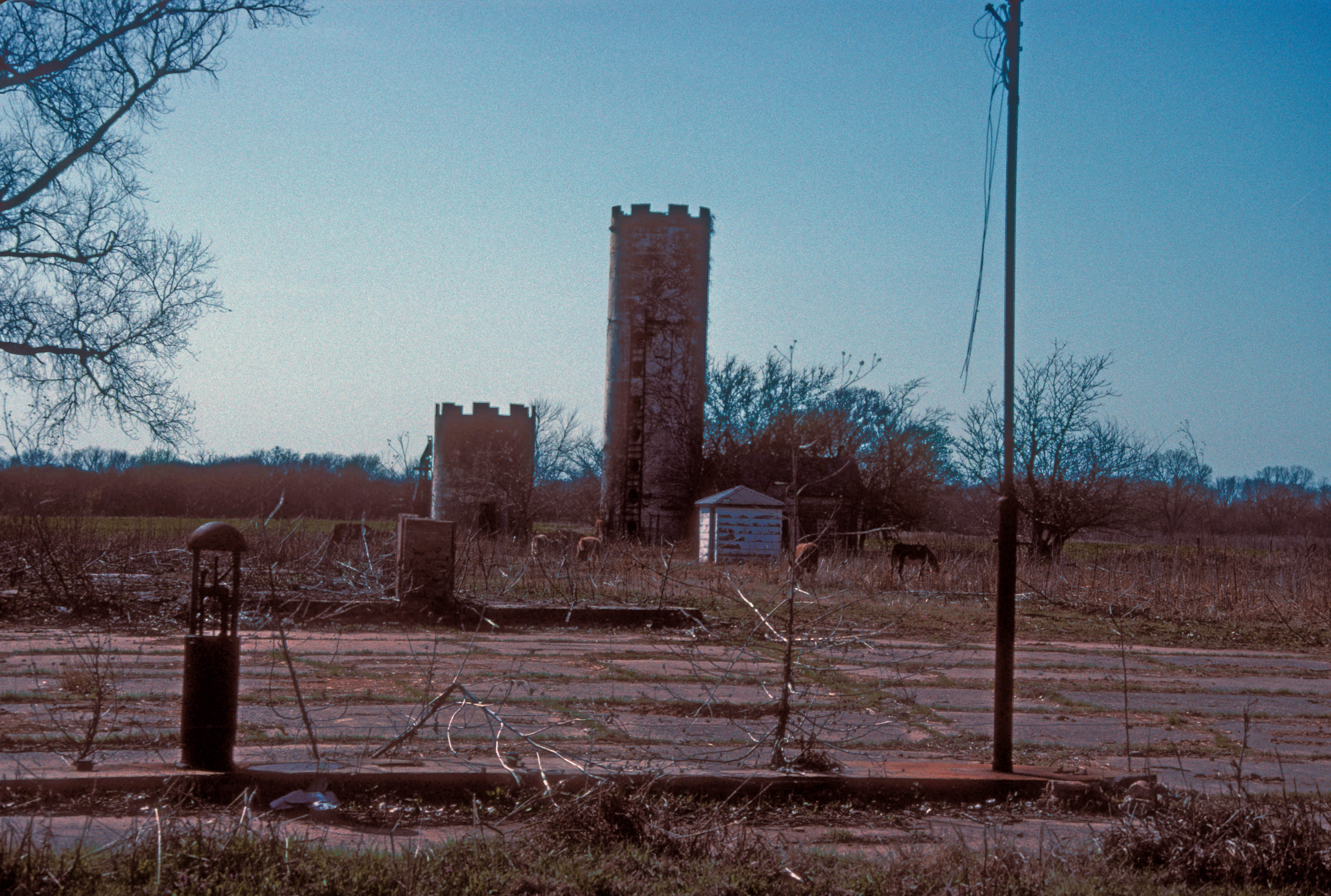

- Location within Oklahoma Location within the United States
- Nearest city: Ponca City, Oklahoma
- Area: 82.6 acres (33.4 ha)
- Built: 1892
- NRHP reference No.: 73001560

Significant dates
- Added to NRHP: April 29, 1973
- Designated NHLD: May 15, 1975

The Miller Brothers 101 Ranch was a 110,000-acre (45,000 ha) cattle ranch in the Indian Territory of Oklahoma before statehood. Located near modern-day Ponca City, it was founded by Colonel George Washington Miller, a veteran of the Confederate Army, in 1893. The 101 Ranch was the birthplace of the 101 Ranch Wild West Show and one of the early focal points of the oil rush in northeastern Oklahoma. It was the largest diversified farm and ranch in America at the time. Bill Pickett's grave and the White Eagle Monument are located on the ranch grounds. The location of the former working cattle ranch was subdivided and all of its buildings destroyed. An 82-acre (33 ha) area of the ranch is a National Historic Landmark. In 2003, the ranch was inducted into the Texas Trail of Fame.

In 1903, when Colonel George Miller died, his three sons, Joseph, George Jr., and Zack took over operation of the 110,000 acre ranch. By 1932 most of the land was owned by the Miller family. They leased other land from the Ponca, Pawnee, and Otoe Indians in Kay, Noble, Osage and Pawnee Counties. The ranch remained in the family for almost 60 years.

== History ==
=== The 101 Ranch Wild West Show ===
The original layout of the ranch

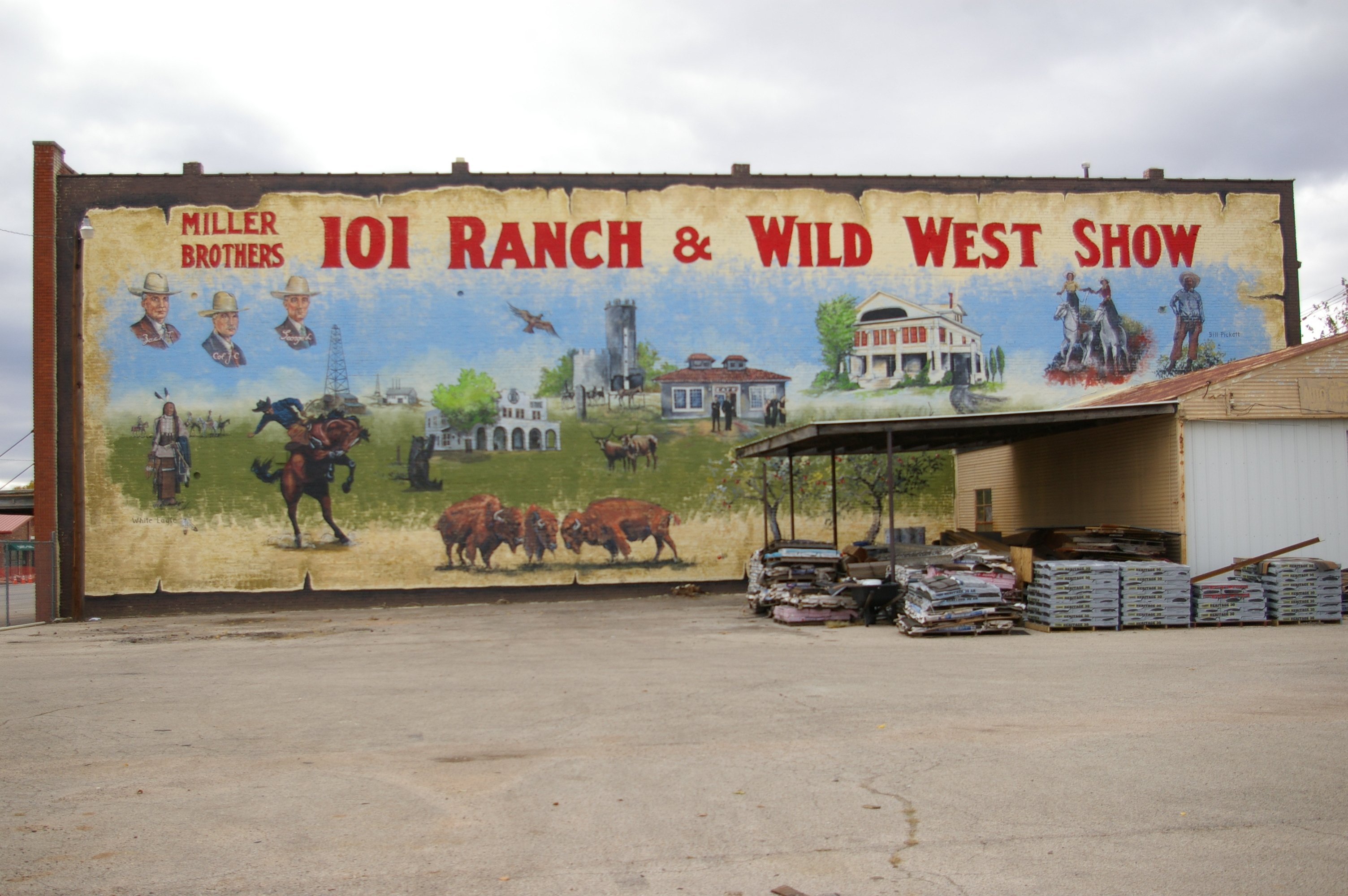
Mural Honoring the Miller Brothers and the 101 Ranch & Wild West Show. Located at 207 W. Grand in Ponca City, OK

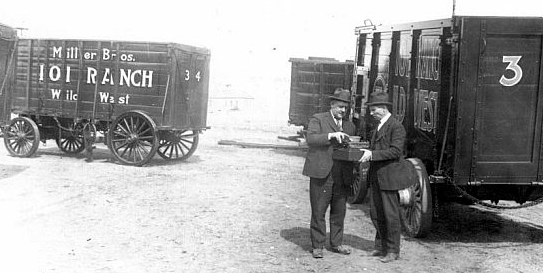
The Miller Brothers 101 Ranch Wild West Show wagons

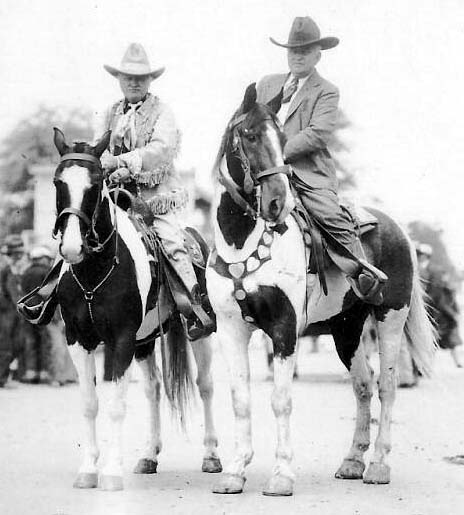
Pawnee Bill and Zack Miller on horseback in Oklahoma

The Millers' neighbor Major Gordon W. Lillie, who performed as Pawnee Bill, motivated the Millers to produce a Wild West show of their own. The Millers made their transition from putting on local shows to the national scene in 1907, when they performed at the Jamestown Exposition in Virginia.

Later in 1907, the Miller Brothers 101 Ranch Wild West Show began the tour circuit in Brighton Beach, New York. Joe Miller, the eldest son, was an exceptional equestrian and star performer. Over the course of the show's history, its cast included Lillian Smith, Bill Pickett, Bessie Herberg, Bee Ho Gray, Tom Mix, Jack Hoxie, Mexican Joe, Ross Hettan, and an elderly Buffalo Bill.

The Miller brothers entered the Wild West Show business late, and suffered financially along with other shows after the invention of motion pictures. Their show had more problems than most in a business that was harsh in the best of times. During their first year on the circuit, they suffered a serious railroad accident. Later several members of their cast contracted typhoid fever.

In 1908, when Buffalo Bill and Pawnee Bill combined their shows into an extravaganza that broke records at Madison Square Gardens in New York City, the Miller Brothers took their show abroad. In England, the British military confiscated most of the 101's horses, stagecoaches and automobiles to build up for war, as tensions were increasing related to impending World War I. When the Millers' show toured the German Empire, authorities arrested some of their Oglala Sioux performers on suspicion of being Serbian spies, and they were never seen again. A frantic Zack Miller got the remaining cast out of Germany via Norway, and then to England. In London he had difficulty finding steamship passage for his people. He eventually obtained passage for his cast on an American ship. Upon return to Oklahoma, the eldest brother Joe Miller refused to pay the Indian cast overtime. Hence the entire Indian cast quit the show.

By 1916, the two younger Miller brothers abandoned trying to work with their volatile oldest brother. George Jr. and Zack worked at the ranch, while Joe schemed to make the Wild West Show a financial success. Joe Miller hired an out-of-work, aging and ill Buffalo Bill to star in a WWI recruitment show called "Pageant of Preparedness." Soon Cody quit the show, and died within a year. Unwilling to end the show, Joe continued to operate on a smaller scale. In 1927, Joe was unable to sell his show to the American Circus Corporation.

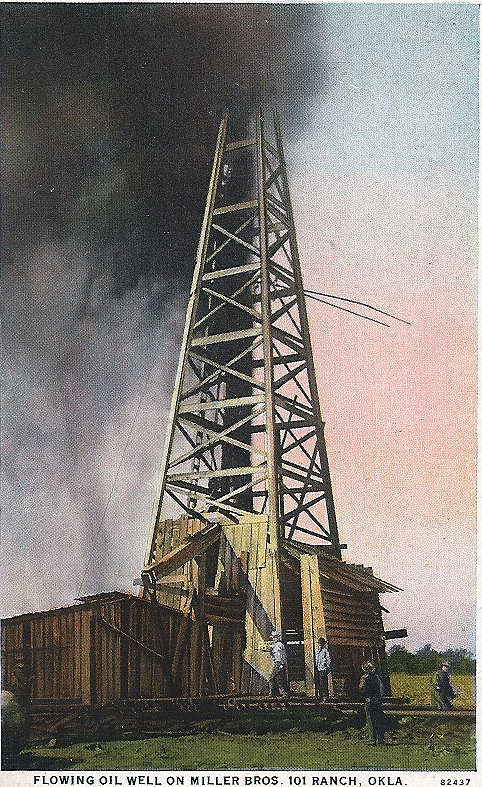

=== Oil and Miller brothers' decline ===
In 1908 the Millers entered into a leasing arrangement with E. W. Marland, who formed the 101 Ranch Oil Company. Oil was struck in 1911 at the "Willie-Cries-for-War" well. Marland would become a millionaire and later a U.S. congressman. He was eventually elected the governor of Oklahoma. The company's 1911 oil discovery led to the founding of the Marland Oil Company, later renamed the Continental Oil Company, and then ConocoPhillips.

Circa 1924, the ranch reportedly had a herd of around 500 American bison. The herd was featured in the film North of 36.

On October 21, 1927, a neighbor found Joe Miller dead in the 101 Ranch garage with his car running. The family physician ruled his death accidental. In 1929, George Miller Jr., died in a car accident.

Zack Miller tried to carry on alone, but in 1932, during the Great Depression, he filed for bankruptcy. The US government seized the show's remaining assets and bought 8,000 acres (3,200 ha) of the 101 Ranch. Completely broke, the 101 Ranch show closed after the New York World's Fair in 1939. Zack Miller died of cancer in 1952.

== National Historic Landmark ==
A small portion of the ranch property was designated a National Historic Landmark in 1975.

After Zack Miller's bankruptcy, the federal Farm Security Administration (FSA) divided the remaining ranch lands and sold off parcels to individuals. The 101 Ranch house and most other buildings were torn down. The 101 Ranch store remained standing until September 22, 1987, when it burned in a fire of unknown origins. Few of the 101 Ranch buildings are left standing today. In 1990, the Oklahoma Legislature designated State Highway 156 as the 101 Ranch Memorial Road. An historical marker is located on the highway about 13 miles (21 km) southwest of Ponca City.

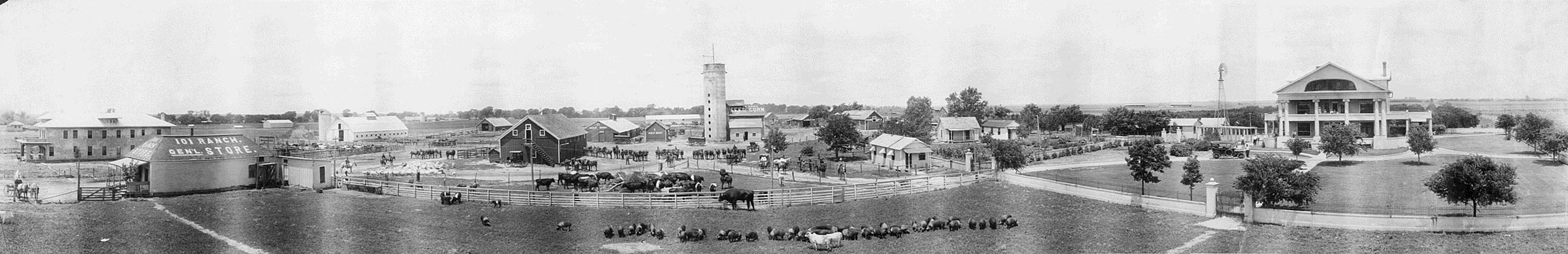
Little of the former 101 Ranch estate remains today. Nearly all of the buildings were destroyed and the land subdivided and sold after the Miller Brothers' final bankruptcy. This photo shows the 101 Ranch as it existed with ranchhouse, corrals, and out-buildings.

== See also ==
- List of Wild West shows
- The 101 Ranch a book about the ranch, written by Ellsworth Collings and Alma Miller England
- List of National Historic Landmarks in Oklahoma
- National Register of Historic Places listings in Kay County, Oklahoma
