= Mexican Joe =

Jose Barrera (1876–1949) became famous as Wild West showman "Mexican Joe". Barrera was reportedly born in Monterrey, Mexico in 1876.

In 1897, Pawnee Bill's Wild West Show was the first to hire Jose as a performer. Only fifteen years old at the time, Jose was already an expert equestrian and roper. Because of his accomplished use of the lariat from horseback, Wild West shows billed him as the greatest trick roper in the world. He toured throughout the United States and Europe with Pawnee Bill, Buffalo Bill Cody, and the Miller Brothers 101 Ranch Show. He and other performers executed the spectacular "Bailable a Caballo" in which riders and horses danced in pairs to the music of a twelve-piece band.

In 1905 Barrera married Effie Cole. Cole became a star in her own right. Her specialties was the High School Horse Act. The couple had three children, two who died in infancy and a daughter, Mary Louise Barrera. With their daughter, the Barreras lived and worked at the Pawnee Bill Ranch near Pawnee, Oklahoma for decades. Jose was the Pawnee Bill Ranch foreman, overseeing livestock and agricultural activities. He died of old age in Pawnee, Oklahoma on November 17, 1949.

== Song ==
The country singer Jim Reeves' first big hit in 1953 was called Mexican Joe.
