= List of museums in Oklahoma =

This list of museums in Oklahoma encompasses museums, defined for this context as institutions (including nonprofit organizations, government entities, and private businesses) that collect and care for objects of cultural, artistic, scientific, or historical interest and make their collections or related exhibits available for public viewing. Museums that exist only in cyberspace (i.e., virtual museums) are not included.

== Main list ==
| Name | Town/city | County | Region | Type | Summary |
|---|---|---|---|---|---|
| 14 Flags Museum | Sallisaw | Sequoyah | Green Country | History | |
| 45th Infantry Division Museum | Oklahoma City | Oklahoma | Central | Military | website, history of the 45th Infantry Division in WW II and the Korean War, also includes military weapons, war cartoons of Bill Mauldin, park with tanks, artillery, personnel carriers, aircraft, and the Thunderbird Monument |
| 99s Museum of Women Pilots | Oklahoma City | Oklahoma | Central | Aviation | History of women in aviation |
| A. D. Buck Museum of Science and History | Tonkawa | Kay | Red Carpet Country | Multiple | Birds and animals of North central Oklahoma, local history, located on the campus of Northern Oklahoma College |
| Afton Station Packard Museum | Afton | Ottawa | Green Country | Automotive | Includes a showroom, 18 Packards & other vintage automobiles, Route 66 memorabilia |
| Alexandre Hogue Gallery | Tulsa | Tulsa | Green Country | Art | website, housed in Phillips Hall and run by the School of Art of the University of Tulsa |
| Alfalfa County Museum | Cherokee | Alfalfa | Red Carpet Country | Local history | website, includes period room displays |
| Alva Regional Airport Museum | Alva | Woods | Red Carpet Country | Aviation | Located in Alva Regional Airport, features artifacts from area aviation history, including the World War II prisoner of war camp formerly located in Alva |
| American Banjo Museum | Oklahoma City | Oklahoma | Central | Music | website, collection of banjos, history of the instrument in America |
| American Pigeon Museum | Oklahoma City | Oklahoma | Central | History | website, history of passenger pigeons, includes historic pigeon equipment clocks, bands, trophies, plaques, paintings and photographs, World War I and II army pigeon corps equipment |
| Anadarko Heritage Museum | Anadarko | Caddo | Southwestern Oklahoma | Local history | website, operated by the Anadarko Philomathic Club |
| Apache Historical Museum | Apache | Caddo | Southwestern Oklahoma | Local history | |
| Arbuckle Historical Museum | Davis | Murray | South Central | Local history | Located in a historic depot |
| Arbuckle Historical Society Museum | Sulphur | Murray | South Central | Local history | Facebook site |
| Arkansas River Historical Society Museum | Catoosa | Rogers | Green Country | Maritime | website, located in the Tulsa Port of Catoosa |
| Ataloa Lodge Museum | Muskogee | Muskogee | Green Country | Native American | website, part of Bacone College, includes North and South American Native artifacts and art, including ceramics, katsinam, weavings, clothing |
| Atkinson Heritage Center | Midwest City | Oklahoma | Central | Historic house | website, part of Rose State College |
| Bartlesville Area History Museum | Bartlesville | Washington | Green Country | Local history | website, displays on area pioneers, Native Americans, oil industry, one room school |
| Beavers Bend Wildlife Museum | Broken Bow | McCurtain | Kiamichi Country | Natural history | website, mounted wildlife dioramas |
| Bigheart Museum | Barnsdall | Osage | Green Country | Local history | |
| Bob Dylan Center | Tulsa | Tulsa | Green Country | Music | Collection of archives of musician Bob Dylan |
| Boswell Museum | Leedey | Dewey | Red Carpet Country | History | Personal collection of buggies, pump organs, old clocks, dishes, and personal items of actress Darla Hood |
| Bristow Historical Museum | Bristow | Creek | Green Country | Local history | Local history and railroad exhibits |
| Buffalo Museum | Buffalo | Harper | Red Carpet Country | Local history | |
| Caddo Tribal Heritage Museum | Binger | Caddo | Southwestern Oklahoma | Native American | Facebook site, cultural traditions of the Caddo people |
| Canadian County Historical Museum | El Reno | Canadian | Central | Local history | |
| Canadian Rivers Historical Society Museum | Geary | Blaine | Red Carpet Country | Local history | |
| Canton Area Museum | Canton | Blaine | Red Carpet Country | Local history | |
| Carl Hubbell Museum | Meeker | Lincoln | Central | Biographical | Baseball player Carl Hubbell, located in City Hall |
| Catoosa Historical Museum | Catoosa | Rogers | Green Country | Local history | |
| Cherokee Heritage Center | Park Hill | Cherokee | Green Country | Native American | Includes Cherokee Nation Museum with Trail of Tears exhibit, Cherokee history and culture, Native American art, Diligwa Village and the Adams Corner Rural Village |
| Cherokee National Prison Museum | Tahlequah | Cherokee | Green Country | Prison | Late 19th-century prison that was the only one in the entire Indian Territory from 1875 to 1901 |
| Cherokee Strip Museum | Alva | Woods | Red Carpet Country | Local history | Includes pioneer exhibits, Native American art and artifacts, period business displays |
| Cherokee Strip Museum | Perry | Perry | Red Carpet Country | Local history | website, history of the Cherokee Outlet and its peoples |
| Cherokee Strip Regional Heritage Center | Enid | Garfield | Red Carpet Country | History | Story of the land run to settle the Cherokee Strip and pioneer life, formerly Museum of the Cherokee Strip, includes Humphrey Heritage Village. Operated by the Oklahoma Historical Society. |
| Cherokee National Supreme Court Museum | Tahlequah | Cherokee | Green Country | History | website, mid 19th-century judicial building with exhibits about area judicial system, newspapers, history |
| Cheyenne City Park and Museums | Cheyenne | Roger Mills | Southwestern Oklahoma | Multiple | website, park with six museums including the Cheyenne Santa Fe Depot Museum, Pioneer Museum, Strong City-Kendall Log Cabin Home, Minnie Slief Community Museum, Roll One Room School House, Veterans Museum, Strong City-Kendall Log Cabin Home and a chapel |
| Chickasaw Bank Museum | Tishomingo | Johnston | South Central | Historic bank | website, operated by the Johnston County Historical Society, historic bank with original bank equipment, Native American baskets, pottery and artifacts |
| Chickasaw Council House Museum | Tishomingo | Johnston | South Central | Native American | Chickasaw artifacts, culture, notable individuals, contemporary art |
| Chickasaw Cultural Center | Sulphur | Murray | South Central | Native American | History and culture of the Chickasaw |
| Chickasaw White House | Milburn | Johnston | South Central | Historic house | First decade of the 20th century period home of Chickasaw Governor Douglas H. Johnston |
| Chisholm Trail Historical Museum | Waurika | Jefferson | Southwestern Oklahoma | History | History of the Chisholm Trail and the people associated with it |
| Chisholm Trail Heritage Center | Duncan | Stephens | Southwestern Oklahoma | History | website, Western heritage, culture and art, life along the trail, cattle drives |
| Chisholm Trail Museum | Kingfisher | Kingfisher | Red Carpet Country | Open-air | website, includes history of the Chisholm Trail and cattle drives, period store displays, antique vehicles and farm equipment, pioneer village with bank, schoolhouse, church, two cabins and a jail |
| Choate House Museum | Indianola | Pittsburg | Kiamichi Country | Historic house | information |
| Choctaw Nation Capitol Museum | Tuskahoma | Pushmataha | Kiamichi Country | Native American | History and culture of the Choctaw Nation, also known as Choctaw Nation Museum |
| Chouteau Memorial Museum | Salina | Mayes | Green Country | History | website, partially recreated trading post and a flatboat |
| Cimarron Heritage Center | Boise City | Cimarron | Red Carpet Country | Open-air | website, includes French Museum with local history exhibits including the Dust Bowl, architect Bruce Goff, Santa Fe Trail, fossils, buttons, 1920s school house, first decade of the 20th century ranch house, depot, farm equipment and machinery |
| Cimarron Valley Railroad Museum | Cushing | Payne | Central | Railroad | website, housed in a Santa Fe depot, includes railroad cars, equipment and memorabilia |
| Citizen Potawatomi Nation Cultural Heritage Center | Shawnee | Pottawatomie | Central | Native American | website, history, culture and art of the Great Lakes cultures, operated by the Citizen Potawatomi Nation |
| Claremore Museum of History | Claremore | Rogers | Green Country | Local history | Includes exhibit and memorial about playwright Lynn Riggs who wrote "Green Grow the Lilacs," the basis for Rodgers & Hammerstein's "Oklahoma!" |
| Coal County Miner's and Historical Museum | Coalgate | Coal | South Central | Mining | website, area coal mining instruments and tools, models, historic photos and area artifacts |
| Collinsville Depot Museum | Collinsville | Tulsa | Green Country | Local history | website, operated by the Collinsville Historical Society |
| Comanche National Museum and Cultural Center | Lawton | Comanche | Southwestern Oklahoma | Native American | website, operated by the Comanche Nation |
| Confederate Memorial Museum & Cemetery | Atoka | Atoka | South Central | Military | website |
| Conoco Museum | Ponca City | Kay | Red Carpet Country | Industry | website, history of the ConocoPhillips Company |
| Coo-Y-Yah Museum | Pryor | Mayes | Green Country | Local history | Exhibits include Cherokee and Osage artifacts and art, local history items, salt-glazed pottery, 19th century printing press |
| D.W. Correll Museum | Catoosa | Rogers | Green Country | Multiple | website, includes antique automobiles, bottles and decanters, rocks and minerals, seashells, antiques, local history |
| Cotton County Museum | Walters | Cotton | Southwestern Oklahoma | Local history | website |
| Covington Historical Museum | Covington | Garfield | Red Carpet Country | Local history | |
| Creek Council House Museum | Okmulgee | Oklahoma | Eastern | Native American | Muscogee (Creek) Nation's historical council house, art, and history |
| Darryl Starbird Rod and Custom Car Hall of Fame Museum | Afton | Ottawa | Green Country | Automotive | website, classic hot rods and custom cars |
| Dave Sasser Memorial Museum | Perkins | Payne | Central | History | Pioneer life |
| Delaware County Historical Society and Mariee Wallace Museum | Jay | Delaware | Green Country | History | Includes toy trains, buggies and wagons, Native American and Trail of Tears historic artifacts |
| Delaware Nation Museum | Anadarko | Caddo | Southwestern Oklahoma | Native American | |
| Dewey County Jail House Museum | Taloga | Dewey | Red Carpet Country | Prison | Also known as Tom Mix Jail, open by appointment |
| Dewey Hotel Museum | Dewey | Washington | Green Country | History | website, restored Victorian hotel with period furnishings and artifacts, operated by the Washington County Historical Society |
| Diamond Point School | Nowata | Nowata | Green Country | Education | Preserved one-room schoolhouse, used for school programs |
| Dobson Museum | Miami | Ottawa | Green Country | Local history | website, operated by the Ottawa County Historical Society |
| Fred and Adeline Drummond House | Hominy | Osage | | Local history | Operated by the Oklahoma Historical Society |
| Drumright Historical Museum | Drumright | Creek | Green Country | Local history | website, operated by the Drumwright Historical Society in a historic depot |
| Dwight Presbyterian Mission | Marble City | Sequoyah | Green Country | Religious | History of the former mission for Native Americans |
| Eastern Trails Museum | Vinita | Craig | Green Country | Local history | website, exhibits on a local Civil War battle, ranching, mercantile, post office, home life, Cherokee influence, military, tools, sports, Route 66 |
| Ed Galloway's Totem Pole Park | Foyil | Rogers | Green Country | Art | Park with concrete totem pole sculptures and museum of Galloway's work |
| Edmond Historical Society Museum | Edmond | Oklahoma | Central | Local history | website |
| Eliza Cruce Hall Doll Museum | Ardmore | Carter | South Central | Doll | |
| Elsing Museum | Tulsa | Tulsa | Green Country | Natural history | website, part of Oral Roberts University, includes gems, minerals, natural art, Native American artifacts, Asian artifacts |
| Eskridge Hotel Museum | Wynnewood | Garvin | South Central | Historic site | website, open by appointment with the Wynnewood Historical Society, historic hotel with period furnishings |
| Field Historical Printing Museum | Hominy | Osage | Green Country | Media | Includes historic printing, Western Union and Dow Jones ticker tape equipment |
| Five Civilized Tribes Museum | Muskogee | Muskogee | Green Country | Native American | Art, history and culture of the Cherokee, Chickasaw, Choctaw, Muscogee (Creek) and Seminole tribes information |
| Foreman Prairie House | Duncan | Stephens | Southwestern Oklahoma | Historic house | website, also known as W.T. Foreman Prairie House, early 20th-century brick home |
| Forest Heritage Center | Broken Bow | McCurtain | Kiamichi Country | Industry | Includes forestry tools, homestead memorabilia, 14 diorama paintings of local history, located in Beavers Bend Resort Park |
| Fort Gibson Historic Site | Fort Gibson | Muskogee | Green Country | Military | Reconstructed frontier fort, original buildings and exhibits |
| Fort Reno | El Reno | Canadian | Central | Military | Visitor center features historic artifacts, photographs, Frederic Remington art about the fort, tours of the historic buildings |
| Fort Sill National Historic Landmark and Museum | Fort Sill | Comanche | Southwestern Oklahoma | Military | website, history of the fort |
| Fort Supply Historic Site | Fort Supply | Woodward | Red Carpet Country | Military | Includes visitor center with exhibits, 5 original building, replicas of the stockade and a tipi |
| Fort Towson Historic Site | Fort Towson | Choctaw | Kiamichi Country | Military | Includes visitor center with exhibits and early 19th century fort ruins |
| Fort Washita Historic Site | Durant | Bryan | South Central | Military | Includes museums and restored mid 19th century fort buildings |
| Frank Phillips Home | Bartlesville | Washington | Green Country | Historic house | website, home of oilman Frank Phillips, includes museum with exhibits about Phillips and his family, the oil industry |
| Fred Jones Jr. Museum of Art | Norman | Cleveland | Central | Art | Part of the University of Oklahoma, collections in American, Native American, Asian, Contemporary and European art, photography |
| Freedom Museum | Freedom | Woods | Red Carpet Country | Local history | Includes late 19th century and early 20th century household items and memorabilia |
| Frisco Depot Museum | Hugo | Choctaw | Kiamichi Country | Local history | website, operated by the Choctaw County Historical Society, displays include Harvey House restaurant, railroads, period business, farm and home life, miniature railroad, a miniature five-ring circus and a moonshine still |
| Frontier Country Museum | Crescent | Logan | Central | Local history | website, includes pioneer artifacts, period home and business displays, one room schoolhouse, oil industry and military displays |
| Garrard Ardeneum | McAlester | Pittsburg | Kiamichi Country | Multiple | Museum with antique furnishings, maps, photographs, and historical items and an arboretum, open by appointment |
| Gardiner Art Gallery | Stillwater | Payne | Central | Art | Part of Oklahoma State University's Bartlett Center for Visual Arts |
| Gardner Mansion and Museum | Broken Bow | McCurtain | Kiamichi Country | Native American | 1884 home of Jefferson Gardner, a Chief of the Choctaw, includes Native American artifacts and fossils |
| Gateway to the Panhandle Museum | Gate | Beaver | Red Carpet Country | Local history | |
| Gaylord-Pickens Museum | Oklahoma City | Oklahoma | Central | History | website, features the Oklahoma Hall of Fame with history and famous people of Oklahoma information, photos, videos and 360 degree tour |
| Gene Autry Oklahoma Museum | Gene Autry | Oklahoma | South Central | Media | Gene Autry and singing cowboy memorabilia from films, television, radio and beyond |
| George M. Murrell Home | Park Hill | Cherokee | Green Country | Historic house | Mid-19th century period home and log cabin with Cherokee living history demonstrations |
| George's Antique Auto Museum | Enid | Garfield | Red Carpet Country | Automotive | Features antique automobiles in period settings |
| Gilcrease Museum | Tulsa | Tulsa | Green Country | Art | Art of the American West, art and artifacts from Central and South America |
| Goddard Center | Ardmore | Carter | South Central | Art | website, performing arts center with four art exhibit galleries and a sculpture garden |
| Goddard Youth Museum | Sulphur | Murray | South Central | Natural history | Operated by Goddard Youth Camp, animals, dinosaurs, fossils, nature |
| Grady County Museum | Chickasha | Grady | Central | Local history | website, operated by the Grady County Historical Society |
| 1893 Land Run Museum & Historical Center | Medford | Grant | Red Carpet Country | Local history | Grant County Historical Society - Open Wed-Sat 10-4 & Sun 1-4 |
| Greater Southwest Historical Museum | Ardmore | Carter | South Central | Local history | website, history of South-Central Oklahoma, exhibits include 1893 log cabin, displays of a general store, drug store, medical and dental office, barbershop, law office, courtroom, post office, school and blacksmith shop, includes the Military Memorial Museum |
| Guthrie Scottish Rite Museum | Guthrie | Logan | Central | Historic site | Material and cultural heritage of the Masonic fraternity |
| Har-Ber Village Museum | Grove | Delaware | Green Country | Open-air | website, turn-of-the-20th-century pioneer village with over 100 buildings and collections of antiques |
| Harmon County Historical Museum | Hollis | Harmon | Southwestern Oklahoma | Local history | website |
| Harn Homestead | Oklahoma City | Oklahoma | Central | History | website, pioneer farm and homestead |
| Harrah History Center | Harrah | Oklahoma | Central | Local history | website, includes museum, restored train depot, caboose and coal cars |
| Haskell County Historical Museum | Stigler | Haskell | Kiamichi Country | Local history | website |
| Healdton Oil Museum | Healdton | Carter | South Central | Industry | Area oil industry and development |
| Heartland Air Museum | Bristow | Creek | Green Country | Aviation | Includes vintage military aircraft, vehicles and memorabilia - may be closed, no current information |
| Heartland of America Museum | Weatherford | Custer | Southwestern Oklahoma | History | website, exhibits include clothing, education, family life, military and patriotism, music and art, religious faiths, Route 66, vintage automobiles, period store and business displays |
| Henry and Shirley Bellmon Library & Museum | Billings | Noble | Red Carpet Country | Biographical | Papers and exhibits of Governor Henry Bellmon |
| Henryetta Territorial Museum | Henryetta | Okmulgee | Green Country | Local history | website |
| Henryetta Art Association Museum | Henryetta | Okmulgee | Green Country | Art | Open by appointment and during art shows |
| Henry Overholser Mansion | Oklahoma City | Oklahoma | Central | Historic house | 1903 Victorian home of social and civic leader Henry Overholser |
| Hinton Historical Museum | Hinton | Caddo | Southwestern Oklahoma | Local history | |
| Indian Territory Museum | Caddo | Bryan | South Central | Local history | |
| International Gymnastics Hall of Fame | Oklahoma City | Oklahoma | Central | Hall of fame — sports | Housed inside the Science Museum Oklahoma |
| J.M. Davis Arms and Historical Museum | Claremore | Rogers | Green Country | Weapons | Includes over 20,000 guns, also knives, beer steins, music boxes, World War I posters, statues by John Rogers |
| Jacobson House Native Art Center | Norman | Cleveland | Central | Art | website, Native American art gallery located in the historic Oscar B. Jacobson House |
| Jasmine Moran Children's Museum | Seminole | Seminole | Central | Children's | |
| Jim Thorpe House | Yale | Payne | Central | Biographical | Home of athlete Jim Thorpe |
| John Frank House | Sapulpa | Creek | Green Country | Historic house | Open by appointment, house designed by architect Bruce Goff for John Frank, founder of Frankoma Pottery |
| Jones and Plummer Trail Museum | Beaver | Beaver | Red Carpet Country | Local history | Operated by the Beaver County Historical Society |
| Kanza Museum | Kaw City | Kay | Red Carpet Country | Native American | website, history and culture of the Kaw people, includes Native American and paleontology exhibits |
| Kaw City Museum | Kaw City | Kay | Green Country | Local history | Located in an old Santa Fe Railroad depot |
| Kenton Mercantile Museum | Kenton | Cimarron | Red Carpet Country | Natural & local history | Combination general store, museum with dinosaur and jar and bottle collection displays, restaurant and gas station |
| Kerr Mansion | Poteau | Le Flore | Kiamichi Country | Biographical | Home of Governor Robert S. Kerr, proposed museum, formerly operated as the Robert S. Kerr Conference Center & Museum |
| Kiowa County Historical Museum | Hobart | Kiowa | Southwestern Oklahoma | Local history | Operated by the Kiowa County Historical Society in a historic depot |
| Kiowa Tribal Museum | Carnegie | Caddo | Southwestern Oklahoma | Native American | website |
| Krebs Heritage Museum | Krebs | Pittsburg | Kiamichi Country | Local history | website |
| Laverne Community Museum | Laverne | Harper | Red Carpet Country | Local history | |
| Leona Mitchell Southern Heights Heritage Center and Museum | Enid | Garfield | Red Carpet Country | African American | website, exhibits include local and American black culture and links to Enid and northwest Oklahoma |
| Leonardo's Discovery Warehouse | Enid | Garfield | Red Carpet Country | Children's | website |
| Lewis Museum | Lawton | Comanche | Southwestern Oklahoma | Multiple | Collections include antique cars, trucks and buggies, trophy wild game heads, furniture, rocks and fossils |
| Lincoln County Museum of Pioneer History | Chandler | Lincoln | Central | Local history | website, operated by the Lincoln County Historical Society, includes Miss Fay’s Historical Marionette Theater |
| Loretta Y. Jackson African American Historical Society Museum | Chickasha | Grady | Central | African American | website, includes one room school |
| Love County Military Museum | Marietta | Love | South Central | Military | Includes photos, artifacts and war memorabilia from World War I up until the present day War in Iraq |
| Love County Pioneer Museum | Marietta | Love | South Central | Local history | Includes pioneer room displays, rocks, fossils, Native American artifacts, collections, farm displays, farm equipment and guns, operated by the Love County Historical Society |
| Lutie Coal Miner's Museum | Wilburton | Latimer | Kiamichi Country | Mining | Open by appointment |
| Mabee-Gerrer Museum of Art | Shawnee | Pottawatomie | Central | Art | Collections include Egyptian, Greek and Roman objects, art from the Middle Ages and Renaissance through the early 20th century, and Native American, African/Oceanic and Eastern cultural artifacts |
| Mac's Antique Car Museum | Tulsa | Tulsa | Green Country | Automotive | May be closed |
| McAlester Building Foundation | McAlester | Pittsburg | Kiamichi Country | Local history | Located in a former high school |
| Sand Creek Museum / Major County Historical Society Museum | Fairview | Major | Red Carpet Country | Local history | website |
| Mannford Museum | Mannford | Creek | Green Country | Local history | Also known as Keystone Crossroads Museum, operated by the Keystone Crossroads Historical Society |
| Marland Estate | Ponca City | Kay | Red Carpet Country | Historic house | Includes 55 room mansion with large grounds and outbuildings, gallery of Bryant Baker sculptures, history of owner E. W. Marland and family, history of Marland Oil Company, history and work of mansion architect John Duncan Forsyth |
| Marland Grand Home | Ponca City | Kay | Red Carpet Country | Multiple | website, 1910s period mansion, includes exhibit rooms for Miller Brothers 101 Ranch history, Native American archaeology, artifacts and art, Daughters of the American Revolution exhibits; formerly Ponca City Cultural Center Museum |
| Marlow Area Museum | Marlow | Stephens | Southwestern Oklahoma | Local history | |
| Mattie Beal House | Lawton | Comanche | Southwestern Oklahoma | Historic house | website, operated by Lawton Heritage Association, early 20th-century mansion |
| Maud Historical Museum | Maud | Pottawatomie | Central | Local history | |
| McAlester Scottish Rite Temple | McAlester | Pittsburg | Kiamichi Country | Masonic | Includes museum about the local Scottish Rite and tours of the historic building |
| McCarter Museum Of Tonkawa History | Tonkawa | Kay | Red Carpet Country | Local history | |
| McClain County Museum | Purcell | McClain | Central | Local history | Includes photos, pioneer furniture and artifacts from the county, operated by the McLain County Historical Society |
| Metcalfe Museum | Durham | Roger Mills | Southwestern Oklahoma | Biographical | website, photos, historic homestead and repository for the works of Oklahoma artist Augusta Corson Metcalfe |
| Midgley Museum | Enid | Garfield | Red Carpet Country | Multiple | Includes gems, minerals, eclectic personal collections of objects and artifacts |
| Military History Center & Museum | Broken Arrow | Tulsa | Eastern | Military | website, American Revolution, Civil War, WWI, WWII, Korea, Vietnam, Desert Storm, Afghanistan, Library, Flight Simulator, Models, Uniforms, Weapons, Photographs, Paintings, Theatre Room, Native American Display |
| Military Memorial Museum | Ardmore | Carter | South Central | Military | website, located in the west wing of the Greater Southwest Historical Museum but separate, includes military artifacts, documents, photographs, uniforms, weapons, knives, models, medals and personal memorabilia |
| Minco Historical Society Museum | Minco | Grady | Central | Local history | website |
| Mission Bell Museum | Coweta | Wagoner | Green Country | Local history | Located in a former early 20th century church |
| Moore-Lindsay House Historical Museum | Norman | Cleveland | Central | Historic house | Operated by the Cleveland County Historical Society, 19th century Victorian period house |
| Morgan Doll Museum | Altus | Jackson | Southwestern Oklahoma | Doll | Features 5,000 antique and collectible dolls, doll buggies and doll houses |
| Murray-Lindsay Mansion | Lindsay | Garvin | South Central | Historic house | website, operated by the Lindsay Community Historical Society |
| Muscle Car Ranch | Chickasha | Grady | Central | Automotive | website, includes early 20th century dairy farm with 5 original barns, museum with automobiles, trucks, motorcycles, automotive signs and memorabilia |
| Museum of Creation Truth | Bokchito | Bryan | Kiamichi Country | Creationist | |
| Museum of Osteology | Oklahoma City | Oklahoma | Central | Natural history | Exhibits of animal and human skeletons |
| Museum of the Great Plains | Lawton | Comanche | Southwestern Oklahoma | Multiple | Cultural and natural history of the Great Plains |
| Museum of the Red River | Idabel | McCurtain | Kiamichi Country | Archaeology | website, includes archaeological artifacts of the Caddo and Choctaw, Precolumbian objects from Middle and South America, modern and contemporary native arts and crafts from throughout the Americas |
| Museum of the Western Prairie | Altus | Jackson | Southwestern Oklahoma | History | website, information, history of southwest Oklahoma through display vignettes and dioramas. Operated by the Oklahoma Historical Society. |
| National Cowboy & Western Heritage Museum | Oklahoma City | Oklahoma | Central | American West | Western and American Indian art works and artifacts including American rodeo, photographs, barbed wire, saddlery, and early rodeo trophies |
| National Hall of Fame for Famous American Indians | Anadarko | Caddo | Southwestern Oklahoma | Native American | Features busts of forty-one Native Americans from various tribes to honor their contributions and place in American history |
| National Route 66 & Transportation Museum | Elk City | Beckham | Southwestern Oklahoma | Transportation | website, history of travel along all eight states on Route 66 |
| National Softball Hall of Fame | Oklahoma City | Oklahoma | Central | Sports | Includes the Don E. Porter Hall of Fame Stadium, home to the World Cup of Softball and the annual Women's College World Series |
| National Wrestling Hall of Fame and Museum | Stillwater | Payne | Central | Sports | |
| Newkirk Community Historical Museum & Heritage Center | Newkirk | Kay | Red Carpet Country | Local history | |
| Newspaper Museum in Collinsville | Collinsville | Tulsa | Green Country | Media | website, open by appointment, history of Collinsville, its people and its newspapers |
| No Man's Land Museum | Goodwell | Texas | Red Carpet Country | Local history | website, affiliate of the Oklahoma Historical Society, operated by the No Man's Land Historical Society |
| Northwestern Oklahoma State University Natural History Museum | Alva | Woods | Red Carpet Country | Natural history | website, mounted birds, mammals and fossils, also known as the Stevens-Carter Museum of Natural History, open by appointment |
| Norton's Indian Territory Museum | Marietta | Love | South Central | History | Located inside Norton's Jewelry, collections include antique medicine and pop bottles, local photos, checks, letterheads, national currency, medicine bottles and more |
| Nowata County Historical Museum | Nowata | Nowata | Green Country | Local history | website, operated by the Nowata County Historical Society |
| Okfuskee County History Center | Okemah | Okfuskee | Central | Local history | website, housed in a 1926 Masonic temple, includes singer Woody Guthrie memorabilia |
| Oklahoma City Museum of Art | Oklahoma City | Oklahoma | Central | Art | Collection includes American and European painting and sculpture, drawings and prints, photography, glass by Dale Chihuly, information |
| Oklahoma City National Memorial | Oklahoma City | Oklahoma | Central | History | Memorial and museum about the Oklahoma City bombing on April 19, 1995 |
| Oklahoma Contemporary | Oklahoma City | Oklahoma | Central | Art | Contemporary art museum |
| Oklahoma Frontier Drug Store Museum | Guthrie | Logan | Central | Medical | website, artifacts and memorabilia associated with frontier pharmacies, early drugstores and medical arts |
| Oklahoma Governor's Mansion | Oklahoma City | Oklahoma | Central | Historic house | |
| Oklahoma History Center | Oklahoma City | Oklahoma | Central | History | History of Oklahoma from prehistoric Native American tribes to the present day |
| Oklahoma Jazz Hall of Fame | Tulsa | Tulsa | Green Country | Hall of fame | Honors jazz, blues and gospel musicians in the state of Oklahoma |
| Oklahoma Military Academy Museum | Claremore | Rogers | Central | Military | website, part of Rogers State University, history of the defunct Academy, which operated from 1919 to 1971 |
| Oklahoma Museum of Flying | Bethany | Oklahoma | Central | Aviation | website, located at Wiley Post Airport, includes military aircraft under restoration, aviation history and artifacts |
| Oklahoma Oil Museum | Seminole | Seminole | Central | Industry | website, operated by the Seminole Historical Society |
| Oklahoma Railway Museum | Oklahoma City | Oklahoma | Central | Railroad | |
| Oklahoma Route 66 Museum | Clinton | Custer | Southwestern Oklahoma | Transportation | Route 66 history and memorabilia operated by the Oklahoma Historical Society. |
| Oklahoma Sports Museum | Guthrie | Logan | Central | Sports | website, also known as the Territorial Sports Museum |
| Oklahoma State Firefighters Museum | Oklahoma City | Oklahoma | Central | Firefighting | Preservation and display of antique fire apparatus and equipment |
| Oklahoma State Penitentiary Museum | McAlester | Pittsburg | Kiamichi Country | Prison | Artifacts and history of Oklahoma's prison system |
| Oklahoma State University Heritage Hall | Stillwater | Payne | Central | Sports | website, history of athletics at OSU |
| Oklahoma Territorial Museum | Guthrie | Logan | Central | History | website, story of Oklahoma's territorial period presented by the Oklahoma Historical Society |
| Oklahoma Territorial Plaza | Perkins | Payne | Central | History | website |
| Oklahoma WONDERtorium | Stillwater | Payne | Central | Children's | website |
| Old Greer County Museum and Hall of Fame | Mangum | Greer | Southwestern Oklahoma | Local history | website, includes period rooms and businesses, pioneer, Native American and cowboy artifacts, antiques, local history displays |
| Old Town Museum | Elk City | Beckham | Southwestern Oklahoma | Open-air | website, includes the Pioneer Museum and Beutler Brothers Rodeo Hall, the Farm and Ranch Museum, Livery Stable, Train Depot, Wagon Yard and other areas depicting Old Town Elk City as well as The National Route 66 and Transportation Museums |
| Oologah Historical Museum | Oologah | Rogers | Green Country | Local history | website, exhibits include farm, ranch, military, school, home, childhood, Will Rogers, business life and early town government displays |
| Osage County Historical Museum | Pawhuska | Osage | Green Country | Local history | website, exhibits include Boy Scouts of America, Western life, pioneer life, early day oil industry, and Native American life |
| Osage Tribal Museum | Pawhuska | Osage | Green Country | Native American | website |
| Owasso Historical Museum | Owasso | Tulsa | Green Country | Local history | website |
| Owens Arts Place Museum | Guthrie | Logan | Central | Art | website |
| Pawnee Bill Ranch and Museum | Pawnee | Pawnee | Green Country | Biographical | Includes museum about Wild West showman Pawnee Bill and wife May Lillie, their 1910 Arts and Crafts home, barn with wagons and farm equipment, log cabin, blacksmith shop, buffalo and cattle |
| Pawnee County Historical Society Museum | Pawnee | Pawnee | Green Country | Local history | website, includes period room displays, Dick Tracy exhibit |
| Peter Conser Home | Heavener | Le Flore | Kiamichi Country | Historic house | website |
| Pfeiffer Farm Collection | Stillwater | Payne | Central | Agriculture | Antique farm equipment and machinery |
| Philbrook Museum of Art | Tulsa | Tulsa | Green Country | Art | |
| Phillips Petroleum Company Museum | Bartlesville | Washington | Green Country | Industry | website, history of Phillips 66, Phillips Petroleum Company and petroleum exploration |
| Picher Mining Field Museum | Picher | Ottawa | Green Country | Mining | |
| Pickens Museum | Ponca City | Kay | Red Carpet Country | Art | website, Native American Turquoise Jewelry; African American art by Malvin Gray Johnson, Faith Ringgold, Woodrow Nash; Native American art by Allan Houser, Josue Sanchez, Yatika Starr Fields, Ed Natiya, Oreland Joe, Clyde Otipoby; Oklahoma art by John Free, Becky Manschreck, Roger Disney, Daniel Pickens; Bronze Sculpture by Donald De Lue, Paul Manship, Jo Davidson, Bryant Baker; Verdite Sculpture of Zimbabwe |
| Piedmont Historical Society Museum | Piedmont | Canadian | Central | Local history | website |
| Pioneer Townsite Museum | Frederick | Tillman | Southwestern Oklahoma | Open-air | website, complex includes Tillman County Historical Museum, depot, barn, general store, church and other buildings, operated by the Tillman County Historical Society |
| Pioneer Woman Museum | Ponca City | Kay | Red Carpet Country | Local history | Exhibits include pioneer family life and women who have made outstanding "pioneering" contributions in space, photography, medicine as well as settling a new land. Operated by the Oklahoma Historical Society. |
| Pittsburg County Historical Museum | McAlester | Pittsburg | Kiamichi Country | Local history | |
| Plains Indians and Pioneers Museum | Woodward | Woodward | Red Carpet Country | History | website |
| Pleasant Valley School | Stillwater | Payne | Central | Education | Preserved one-room schoolhouse open for school tours |
| Pottawatomie County Museum | Shawnee | Pottawatomie | Central | Local history | website, operated by the Historical Society of Pottowatomie County, formerly the Santa Fe Depot Museum |
| Prague Historical Museum | Prague | Lincoln | Central | Local history | Exhibits include Czech heritage, Native Americans, early business, a doll collection and a military room |
| Prairie Song | Dewey | Washington | Green Country | Open-air | website, open by appointment, replica 19th-century pioneer town with saloon, hardware store, chapel, trading post |
| Price Tower Arts Center | Bartlesville | Washington | Green Country | Multiple | Historic tower designed by Frank Lloyd Wright, includes museum galleries with exhibits of art, architecture and design |
| Pushmataha County Historical Museum | Antlers | Pushmataha | Kiamichi Country | Local history | Operated by the Pushmataha County Historical Society in a former depot |
| Putnam City Schools Museum | Warr Acres | Oklahoma | Central | Local history | website |
| Railroad Museum of Oklahoma | Enid | Garfield | Red Carpet Country | Railroad | Located in a former Atchison Topeka and Santa Fe freight depot, features operating HO and N-gauge model railroads, rolling stock, railroad artifacts and a reference library |
| Ralph Cain Jr. Memorial Newspaper Museum | Carmen | Alfalfa | Red Carpet Country | Media | Demonstrations of 1916 newspaper printing using handset type and vintage equipment |
| Red Earth | Oklahoma City | Oklahoma | Central | Native American | American Indian arts and culture, includes fine art, pottery, basketry, textiles, and beadwork |
| Renfrow-Miller Museum | Billings | Noble | Red Carpet Country | Historic house | Early 20th-century home and office of pioneer doctor Thomas F. Renfrow |
| Richard O. Dodrill's Museum of Rocks, Minerals & Fossils | Cushing | Payne | Central | Natural history | |
| Roger Miller Museum | Erick | Beckham | Southwestern Oklahoma | Biographical | Life and memorabilia of singer and composer Roger Miller |
| Round Barn | Arcadia | Oklahoma | Central | Historic site | website, used for special events by the Arcadia Historical Society |
| Route 66 Interpretive Center | Chandler | Lincoln | Central | Transportation | Impact of Route 66 and automobiles on local communities |
| Route 66 Vintage Iron Motorcycle Museum | Miami | Ottawa | Green Country | Transportation | website, motorcycles, bicycles |
| Rural Oklahoma Museum of Poetry | Locust Grove | Mayes | Green Country | Poetry | website, poetry, nature, rural life, writing, literature |
| Sam Noble Oklahoma Museum of Natural History | Norman | Cleveland | Central | Natural history | |
| Sand Springs Historical and Cultural Museum | Sand Springs | Tulsa | Green Country | Local history | website |
| Santa Fe Depot Museum | Pauls Valley | Garvin | South Central | Local history | |
| Sapulpa Historical Society Museum | Sapulpa | Creek | Green Country | Local history | website, exhibits include Glenpool Oil Field, Frisco Railroad, Creek and Yuchi Indians, brick glass & pottery industries, 1890s kitchen, country store and war room |
| Science Museum Oklahoma | Oklahoma City | Oklahoma | Central | Multiple | Hands-on science museum that also houses the Kirkpatrick Planetarium, Oklahoma Aviation and Space Hall of Fame, International Gymnastics Hall of Fame; formerly the Omniplex Science Museum |
| Seay Mansion | Kingfisher | Kingfisher | Red Carpet Country | Historic house | Also known as Governor Seay Mansion, Victorian mansion home of Oklahoma territorial governor Abraham Jefferson Seay, operated by the Chisholm Trail Museum |
| Seminole Nation Museum | Wewoka | Seminole | Central | Native American | website |
| Sequoyah's Cabin | Sallisaw | Sequoyah | Green Country | Historic house | Home of Sequoyah or George Gist, who created a written language for the Cherokee nation |
| Shattuck Windmill Museum | Shattuck | Ellis | Red Carpet Country | Technology | website, park features 51 vintage windmills, a wind generator and a half-dugout home |
| Sheerar Museum | Stillwater | Payne | Central | Local history | website |
| Sherwin Miller Museum of Jewish Art | Tulsa | Tulsa | Green Country | Art | Jewish culture, history, religion and art |
| Shortgrass Country Museum | Sayre | Beckham | Southwestern Oklahoma | Local history | website |
| Simpson's Old Time Museum | Enid | Garfield | Red Carpet Country | History | website, 19th century old west memorabilia, movie studio |
| Skiatook Museum | Skiatook | Osage | Green Country | Local history | website |
| Sod House Museum | Aline | Alfalfa | Red Carpet Country | Historic house | Operated by the Oklahoma Historical Society |
| Southern Plains Indian Museum | Anadarko | Caddo | Southwestern Oklahoma | Native American | website, arts and artifacts of western Oklahoma tribal peoples |
| Spencer Historical Society Museum | Spencer | Oklahoma | Central | Local history | |
| Spiro Mounds | Spiro | Le Flore | Kiamichi Country | Native American | Ancient ceremonial mounds and visitor center with artifacts administered by the Oklahoma Historical Society. |
| Stafford Air & Space Museum | Weatherford | Custer | Southwestern Oklahoma | Aerospace | Aviation, space exploration and rocketry |
| State Capital Publishing Museum located in Co-Operative Publishing Company Building | Guthrie | Logan | Central | Media | website, history of printing and architecture in Oklahoma, includes original printing equipment, operated by the Logan County Historical Society |
| Stephens County Historical Museum | Duncan | Stephens | Southwestern Oklahoma | Local history | Includes period business and room displays, Native American artifacts, household items, tools, antiques |
| Stillwater Airport Memorial Museum | Stillwater | Payne | Central | Aviation | Located in Stillwater Regional Airport Terminal |
| Tahlonteeskee Cherokee Courthouse Museum | Gore | Sequoyah | Kiamichi Country | Native American | Recreated first capitol building of the Cherokee Nation |
| Talbot Library and Museum | Colcord | Delaware | Green Country | Local History | website |
| Tannehill Museum | McAlester | Pittsburg | Kiamichi Country | Local History | Private collection of historical guns, artifacts relating to the Oklahoma State Penitentiary and other special collections with local interest. |
| T.B. Ferguson Home | Watonga | Blaine | Red Carpet Country | Historic house | website, home of Oklahoma territorial governor Thompson Benton Ferguson |
| Territory Town Museum | Okemah | Okfuskee | Central | History | Store fronts of the old western town. The museum exhibits include Civil War relics, Wells Fargo items, Indian artifacts, western memorabilia, and souvenirs |
| Thomas-Foreman Historic Home | Muskogee | Muskogee | Green Country | Historic house | Home of Oklahoma history author Grant Foreman |
| Three Rivers Museum | Muskogee | Muskogee | Green Country | Local history | website |
| Three Valley Museum | Durant | Bryan | South Central | Local history | |
| Timberlake Rose Rock Museum | Noble | Cleveland | Central | Natural history | website, rocks and minerals, focus is the barite rose rock, the state rock of Oklahoma |
| Tom Mix Museum | Dewey | Washington | Green Country | Biographical | website, movie cowboy Tom Mix, operated by the Oklahoma Historical Society |
| Tonkawa Tribal Museum | Tonkawa | Kay | Red Carpet Country | Native American | |
| Top of Oklahoma Historical Society Museum | Blackwell | Kay | Red Carpet Country | Local history | |
| Townsend's Classic & Antique Auto Collection | Shawnee | Pottawatomie | Central | Automotive | |
| Toy & Action Figure Museum | Pauls Valley | Garvin | South Central | Toy | website, art and sculpting of action figures |
| Tucker Tower Nature Center | Ardmore | Carter | South Central | Natural history | Located in Lake Murray State Park, exhibits of local geology, wildlife, and native inhabitants |
| Tulsa Air and Space Museum | Tulsa | Tulsa | Green Country | Aerospace | |
| Tulsa Geoscience Center | Tulsa | Tulsa | Green Country | Science | website, geology, earthquakes, oil exploration and industry |
| Tulsa Historical Society | Tulsa | Tulsa | Green Country | Local history | website, located in the historic Samuel Travis Mansion, changing exhibits of Tulsa and Oklahoma history |
| Tulsa Zoo and Living Museum | Tulsa | Tulsa | Green Country | Zoo | |
| Twister Museum | Wakita | Grant | Red Carpet Country | Media | website, location and items used in filming the movie Twister |
| University of Central Oklahoma Galleries | Edmond | Oklahoma | Central | Art | website, several galleries of art, photography, design and important papers in the College of Arts, Media & Design |
| University of Science and Arts of Oklahoma Nesbitt Gallery | Chickasha | Grady | Central | Art | website |
| Untitled (ArtSpace) | Oklahoma City | Oklahoma | Central | Art | website, contemporary art gallery |
| U.S. Army Artillery Museum | Fort Sill | Comanche | Southwestern Oklahoma | Military | website, history of the United States Army Field Artillery School and artillery, includes over 70 guns and artillery pieces |
| USS Batfish | Muskogee | Muskogee | Green Country | Maritime | Submarine museum ship and war memorial park |
| Wagoner City Historical Museum | Wagoner | Wagoner | Green Country | Local history | |
| Washington Irving Trail Museum | Ripley | Payne | Central | Local history | website, exhibits include early-day explorers, lawmen and outlaws, a Civil War battle, the beginnings of country music, Southeast Native American artifacts |
| Washita Battlefield National Historic Site | Cordell | Roger Mills | Southwestern Oklahoma | Local history | Visitor center and site of the Southern Cheyenne village of Peace Chief Black Kettle where the Battle of Washita occurred |
| Washita County Museum | Cordell | Roger Mills | Southwestern Oklahoma | Local history | Located in a former Carnegie library |
| Waynoka Historic Air Rail Museum & Station | Waynoka | Woods | Red Carpet Country | Local history | website, located in the Harvey House, operated by the Waynoka Historical Society |
| Webbers Falls Historical Museum | Webbers Falls | Muskogee | Green Country | Local history | |
| Wichita Tribal History Center | Anadarko | Caddo | Native American | Wichita and Affiliated Tribes | The official museum of the Wichita and Affiliated Tribes in Southwest Oklahoma |
| Wildlife Heritage Center Museum | Antlers | Pushmataha | Kiamichi Country | Natural history | website, mounted wildlife displays |
| Willard Stone Museum | Locust Grove | Mayes | Green Country | Art | website, art of Cherokee sculptor Willard Stone |
| Will Rogers Birthplace | Oologah | Rogers | Green Country | Historic house | Post-Civil War period home and ranch where entertainer Will Rogers was born |
| Will Rogers Museum | Claremore | Rogers | Green Country | Biographical | Artifacts, memorabilia and tomb of entertainer Will Rogers |
| Wilson Historical Museum | Wilson | Carter | South Central | Local history and genealogy | website, operated by the Wilson Historical Society |
| Woody Guthrie Center | Tulsa | Tulsa | Green Country | Music | Life and music of singer Woody Guthrie |
| Woolaroc Museum | Bartlesville | Washington | Green Country | Multiple | Includes Western paintings and sculpture, Western artifacts and culture, Colt firearms, Native American pottery, baskets, beads, blankets and cultural art, life of oilman Frank Phillips |
| World Organization of China Painters Museum | Oklahoma City | Oklahoma | Central | Art | website, art on porcelain objects |
| Yukon Historical Society Museum and Art Center | Yukon | Canadian | Central | Multiple | Local history and art |
| Yukon Veteran Museum | Yukon | Canadian | Central | Military | |
| Yukon's Best Railroad Museum | Yukon | Canadian | Central | Railroad | |

== Defunct museums ==
- Center of the American Indian (1978–1992), Oklahoma City
- Derailed Railroad Company Museum, Blackwell, display moved to Top of Oklahoma Historical Society Museum after creator's death
- Ida Dennie Willis Museum of Miniatures, Dolls, and Toys, Tulsa
- Indian City USA Cultural Center, Anadarko
- International Linen Registry Museum, Tulsa
- National Lighter Museum, Guthrie
- Old Santa Fe Depot of Guthrie, Guthrie
- RS & K Railroad Museum, Sayre

== See also ==
- Aquaria in Oklahoma (category)
- List of historical societies in Oklahoma
- Nature Centers in Oklahoma
