= Fran Lew =

American painter

Fran Lew (born 1946) is an American master portrait artist. She is a contemporary realist, trained in academic classical realism. Lew's style of portraiture combines traditional techniques of the Old Masters with her own contemporary vision.

== Biography ==
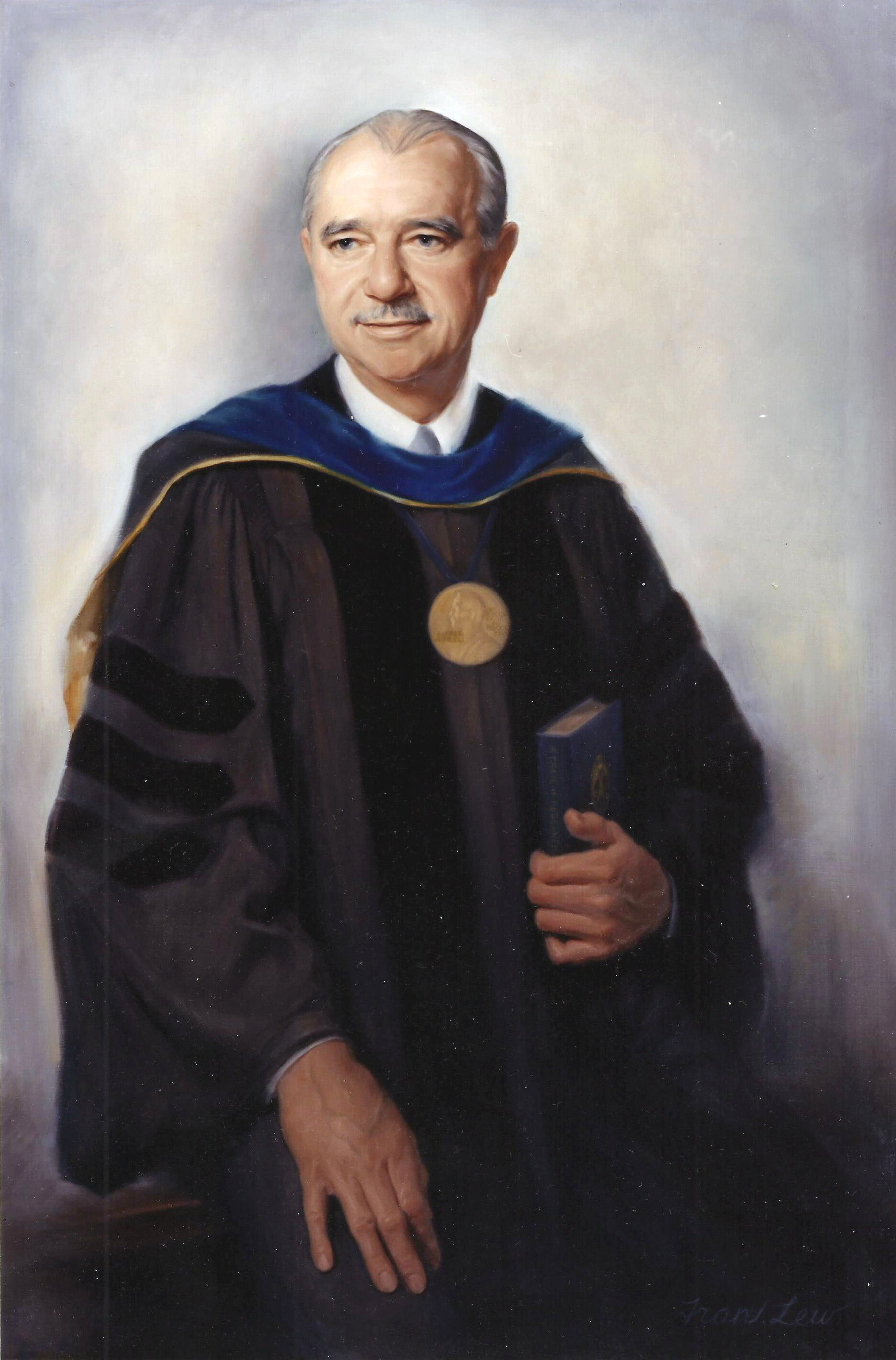
Dr. Vincent du Vigneaud by Fran Lew

Lew comes from a family of artists. She began drawing at her father's side at the age of three. Her formal studies earned her an MFA degree from Boston University. She did her postgraduate work in Venice, Italy at the Palazzo Grassi International Center for Painting and Design. In New York City, she studied at the Art Students League with masters Daniel Greene, Robert Beverly Hale and John Howard Sanden.

Lew later moved to White Plains, New York, where she studied under the mentorship of the late Cesare Borgia. Borgia was himself a student of Frank Reilly. Lew herself has been influenced by the Reilly principles of painting. This influence is evident at all of her exhibits, among which were portraits and figures at the Columbus Club and Grand Central Art Galleries in New York City.

Lew was represented by the Grand Central Art Galleries, which closed in 1994. Many of the Grand Central Art Galleries records are archived at the Smithsonian Institution.

== Museum and other collections ==
Among other places, her work can be found at the Federal Reserve Board of Governors, Washington, D.C.; Cornell Museum of Art & American Culture, Delray Beach Florida; Sherwin Miller Museum, Tulsa Oklahoma; Maitland Art Center, Maitland, Florida; State of Israel Collection, Tel Aviv, Israel; and the Brooklyn Historical Society, Brooklyn New York, Chuck Jones Gallery Costa Mesa California.

== Awards ==
- Gold Medal, Knickerbocker Artists, 1984
- Thora M. Jensen Portrait Award, Hudson Valley Art Assn., 1985
- Sharon Ortlip Memorial Award, Salmagundi Club, 1985
- Anna Hyatt Huntington Bronze Medal, First Place Graphic, Catherine Lorillard Wolfe Art Club, 1986
- Crescent Cardboard Company, Corporate Prize, American Artist Magazine Golden Anniversary National Competition, 1987
- Solo Award-Best Show, Pen & Brush Club Oil Exhibit, 1987
- Margaret Dole Portrait Award, Catherine Lorillard Wolfe Art Club, 1988
