= Guide (Oklahoma newspaper) =

African American newspaper 1897–1903

The Guide was an African American newspaper published in Oklahoma Territory from around 1897 to 1903. It was edited and published by Mattie M. Mallory, who served as managing editor from 1897 to 1898. The paper served Black communities during a time when many new institutions were being established in the region. The Guide was issued monthly.

Issues of The Guide have been preserved and microfilmed by Library of Congress. Additional materials related to the newspaper and its historical context are held by Oklahoma Historical Society.

== History ==
The Guide was associated with the work of Mattie M. Mallory in Indian Territory (present-day Oklahoma) in the late 1890s. In 1897, while serving as principal of Dawes Academy near Berwyn, a school for children of formerly enslaved families, she became managing editor of the newspaper. The paper circulated among African American communities in the region and functioned as a platform for communication. Mallory also participated in religious and philanthropic work, including the development of the Oklahoma Orphanage, which she promoted through the newspaper to attract public attention and support.

== Content ==
The Guide included religious and educational material influenced by the Holiness movement, such as biblical instruction and moral teachings that focused on personal discipline and spiritual life. It also reflected Mattie M. Mallory's work in education and social reform and was used to promote her efforts in child welfare. The newspaper addressed issues affecting African American communities in the region, especially education and local social conditions.
