= Pawnee Bill Ranch =

Home of entertainer in Oklahoma, US

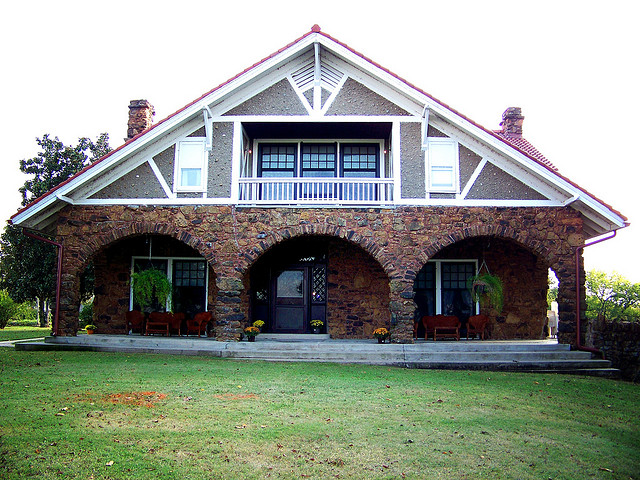
Pawnee Bill's home

The Pawnee Bill Ranch, also known as the Blue Hawk Peak Ranch, was the home of Wild West show entertainer, Gordon W. "Pawnee Bill" Lillie. Located in Pawnee, Oklahoma, it is owned and operated by the Oklahoma Historical Society. The Pawnee Bill Ranch consists of 500 of the original 2000 acres, original outbuildings, a fully furnished historic home, a modern museum, and a herd of bison, Longhorn cattle, and horses.

== History of Blue Hawk Peak ==
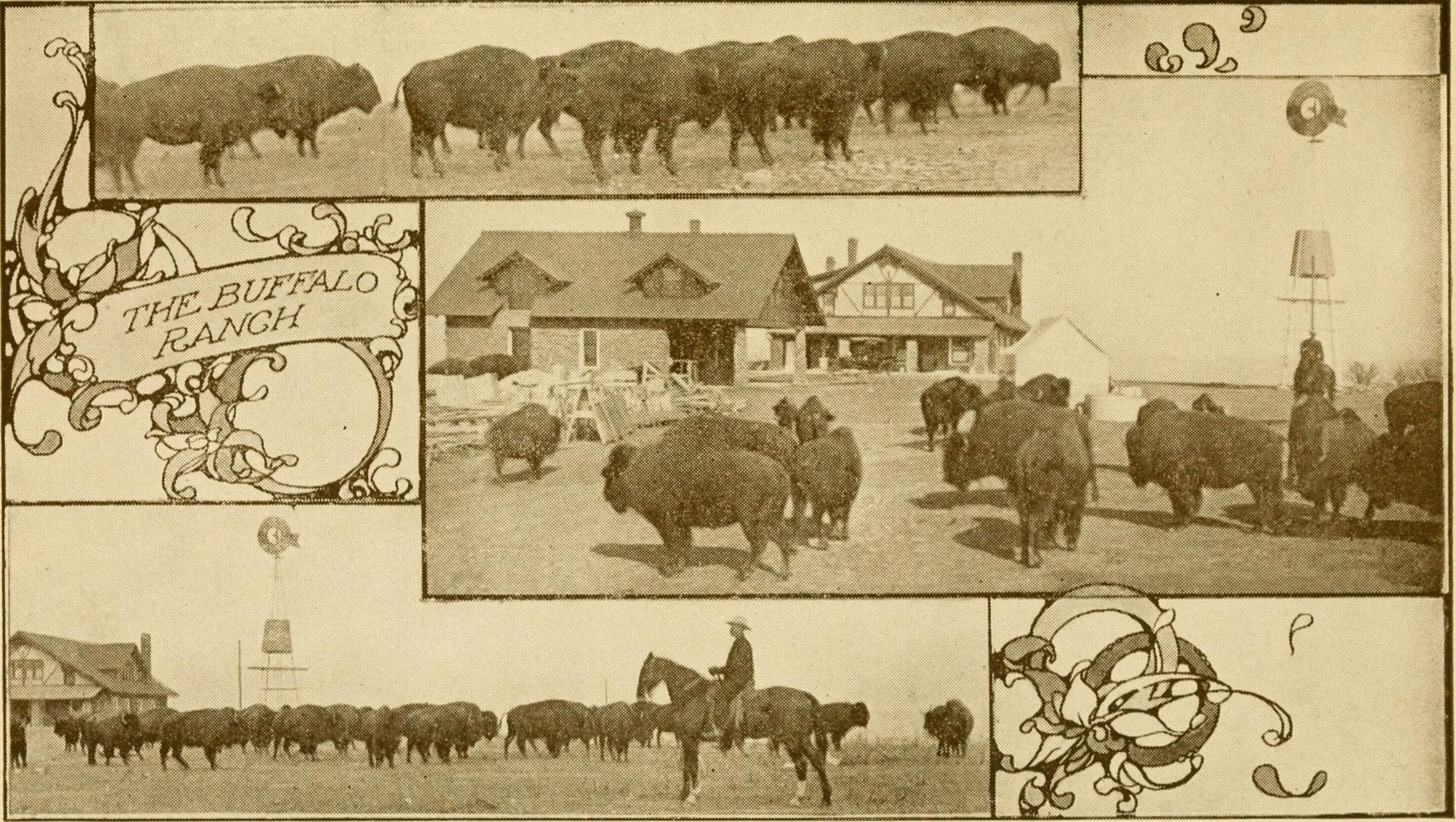
Pawnee Bill's ranch in 1911

Pawnee Bill believed strongly in the importance of the bison to the history of the American West and to the Plains Indian culture. He desired to perpetuate and develop the bison and lobbied congress to pass legislation to protect the animal. This was the beginning of the ranch's time as a bison preservation. The ranch is an active member of the Oklahoma Bison Association today.

In December 1910, Lillie and his wife May's dream of a home on top of a hill overlooking a bend in the Black Bear River was realized. The building of their Tudor-style Arts and Crafts home was completed after nearly a year of construction. James Hamilton, an architect from Chester, Pennsylvania, designed the home with input from Lillie and his wife. The home was a beautiful crafted residence, both comfortable and modern. Area laborers worked to construct the nearly 5,300 square feet (490 m^{2}) home from native stone quarried from the Ranch grounds.

Between the years of 1910 and 1926, many other buildings were added to the ranch site. Between 1910 and 1913 the carriage house, log cabin, blacksmith shop, and observation tower were added to the site by the Lillies to accommodate their growing businesses. In 1926, to meet the need for larger livestock accommodations, the Lillies built an impressive three story barn. The barn housed Pawnee Bill's herd of Scottish Shorthorn cattle. Its basement level sheltered the ranch horses while the second floor provided housing for the cattle. The top was used as storage for alfalfa and other feed crops harvested from the ranch property.

On October 10, 1975, the site was included on the National Register of Historic Places under the original title of Blue Hawk Peak Ranch.

== Modern use ==
Since 1962, Blue Hawk Peak has been owned by the State of Oklahoma. Now operated by the Oklahoma Historical Society, Pawnee Bill Ranch, as it is known today, is open as a historic site dedicated to the preservation and interpretation of history as it relates to Pawnee Bill and May. The site also houses exhibits on ranching, Wild West shows, and the American Indian experience in the Wild West show. In 1970, a museum was built on the site to house the Western collection as well as provide an educational experience for visitors. Open year-round, the Pawnee Bill Ranch provides educational programming for adults and children as well as a yearly re-enactment of Pawnee Bill's Historic Wild West Show.

== Boy Scouts of America ==
In 1938, during the latter years of Pawnee Bill's life, he deeded the ranch property to the Boy Scouts of America, an organization for which he had a deep respect. On May 25, 1940, the Boy Scouts of America declined the offer. Since this time, the Pawnee Bill Ranch has been closely associated with the Boy Scouts, serving as a site for numerous Eagle Projects as well annual campouts for local and council groups. There was a Pawnee Bill District in the Will Rogers Council, and later the Cimarron Council, named in his honor for many years.

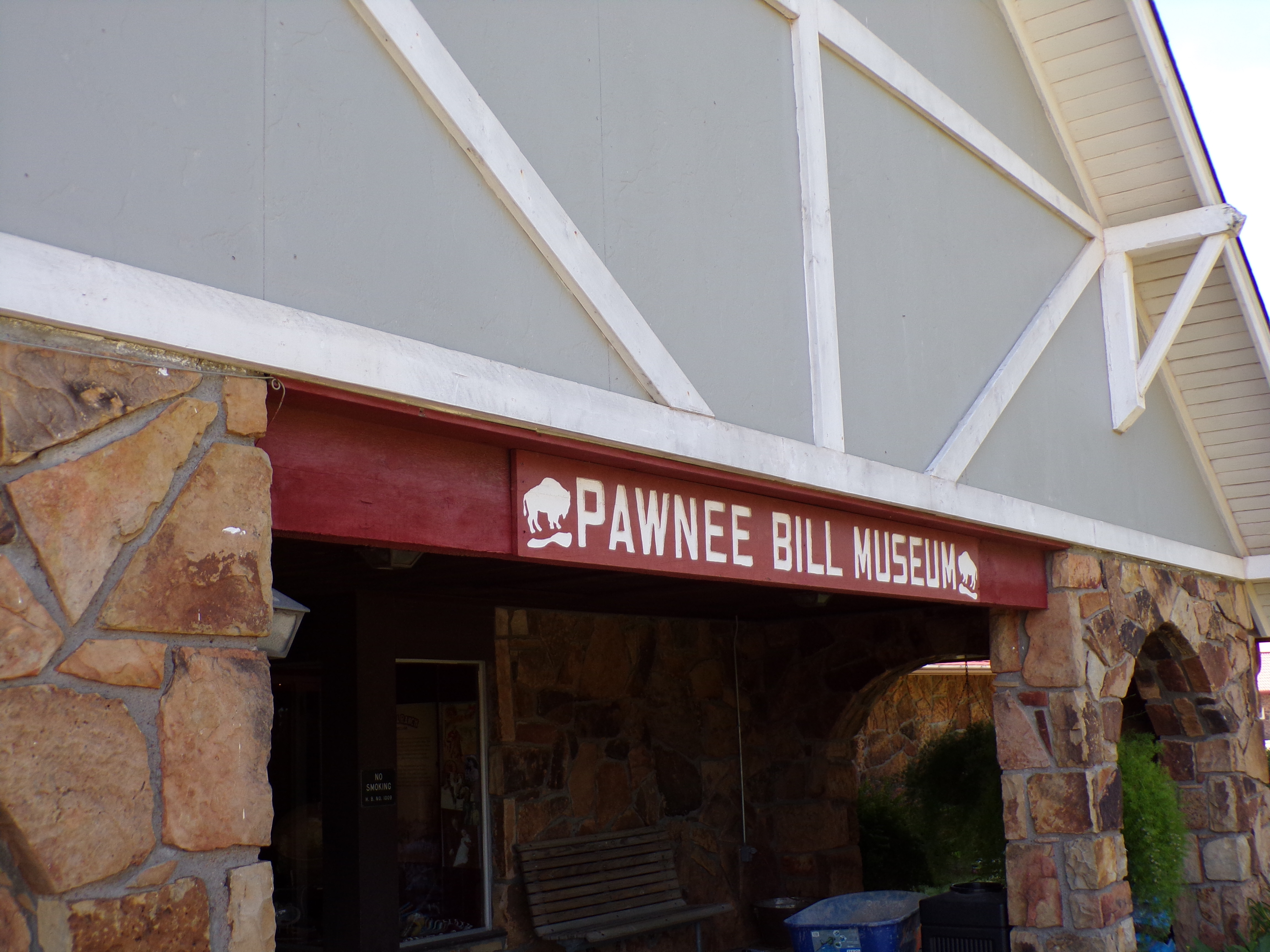
Pawnee Bill Museum Entrance

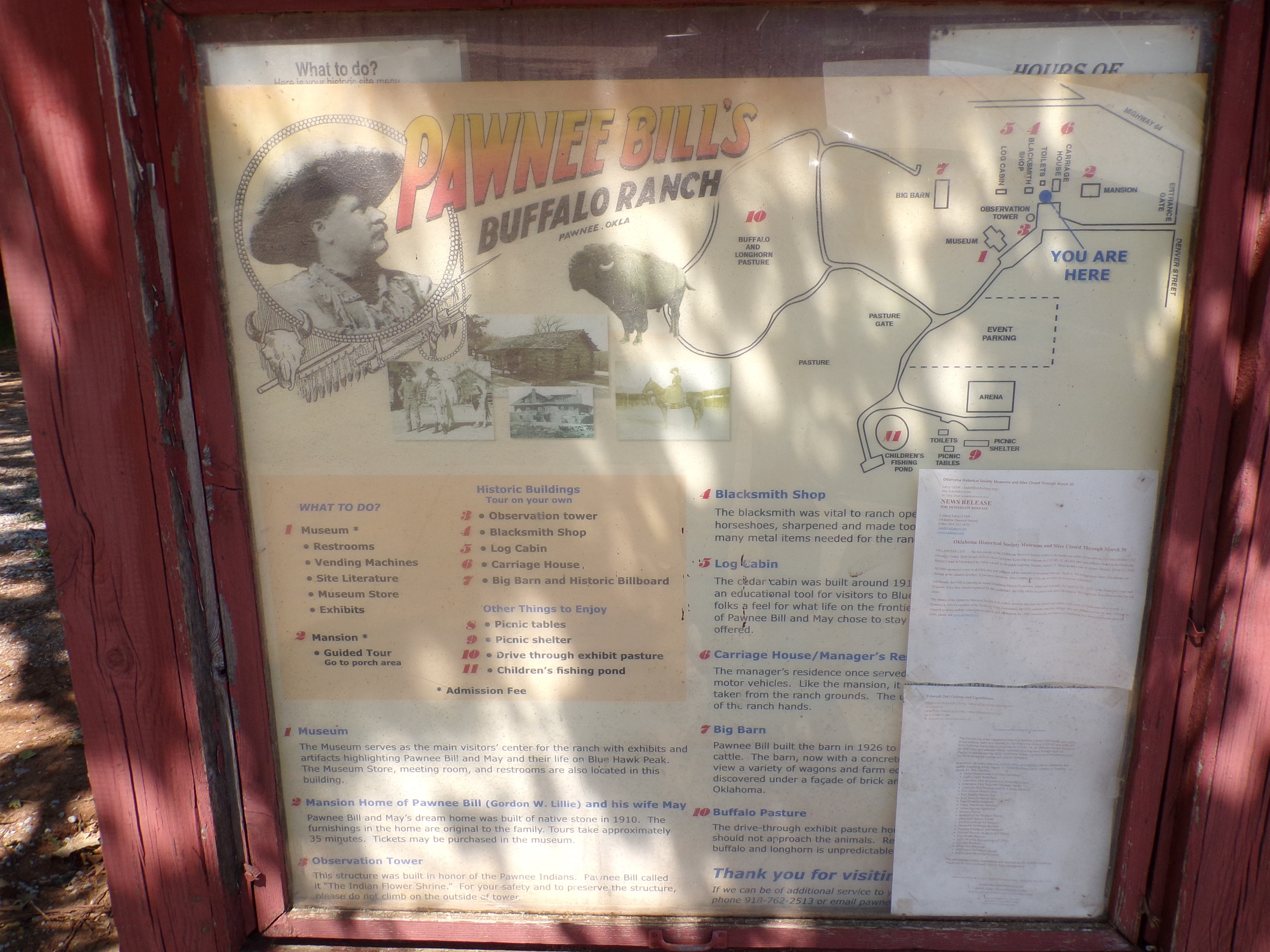
Pawnee Bill Museum Site Menu

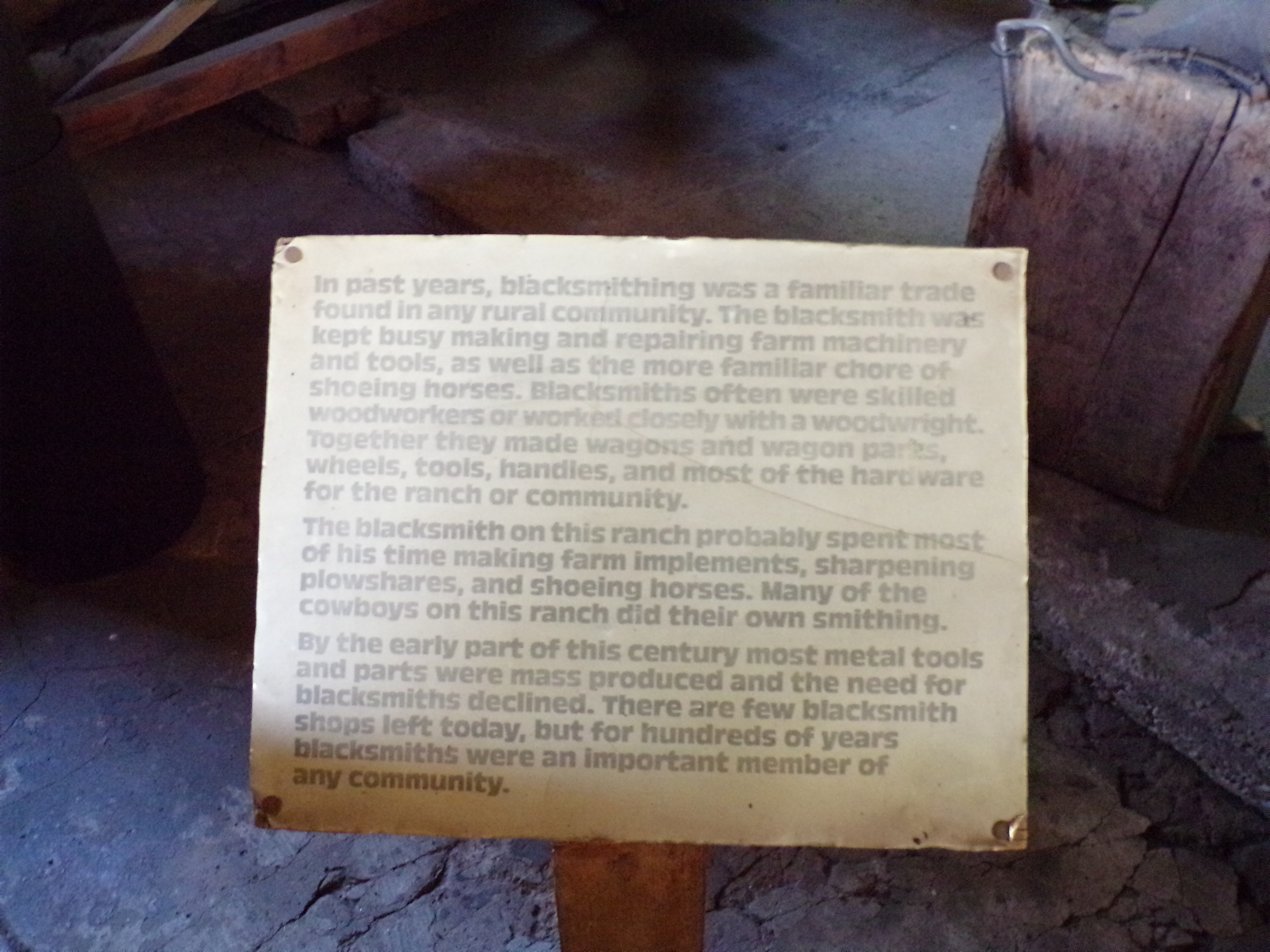
Pawnee Bill Museum Blacksmith Marker

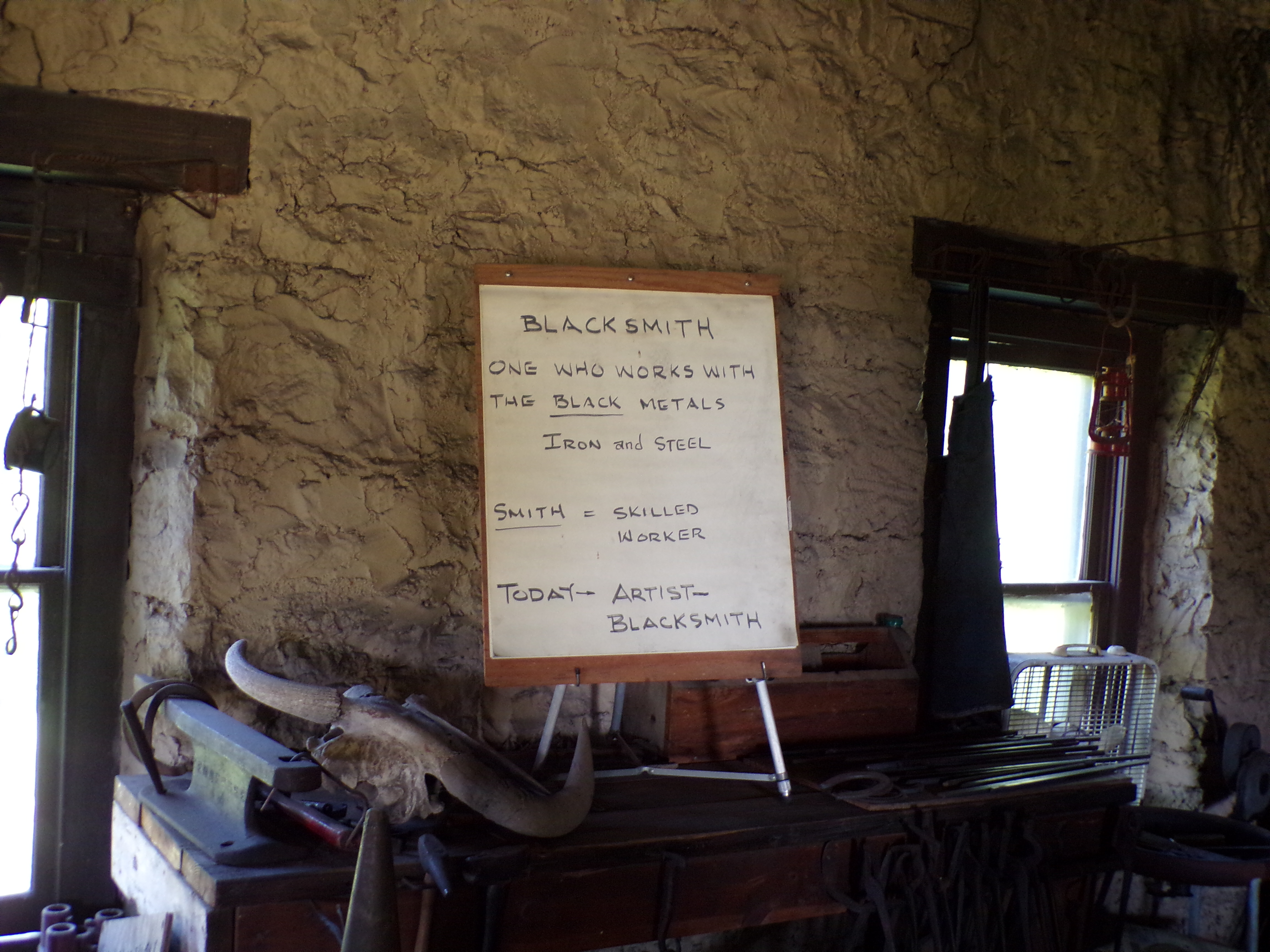
Pawnee Bill Museum Blacksmith Sign

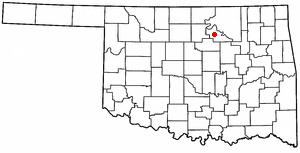
Pawnee, Oklahoma

== Links ==
- www.pawneebillranch.org - The official site of the Pawnee Bill Ranch, owned and managed by the Oklahoma Historical Society.
- http://www.travelok.com/listings/view.profile/id.5773 - The Pawnee Bill Ranch page operated by TravelOK.com, the Oklahoma Tourism and Recreation Department's official site.
- http://www.ocgi.okstate.edu/shpo/nhrpdfs/75001571.pdf - The nomination form for Blue Hawk Peak on the National Register of Historic Places.
