= Margaret Fernald Dole =

American painter

Margaret Fernald Dole (May 5, 1896 – March 1, 1970) was an American painter.

She was born Margaret Fernald in Melrose, Massachusetts. She studied at Radcliffe College from 1914 to 1915, and at the Boston Museum School Fine Art from 1915 to 1918. In 1921 she married John S. Dole. She died in Port Chester, New York.

During her career she exhibited in the Paris Salon, the Pennsylvania Academy of Fine Arts, the National Academy of Design, the Corcoran Gallery of Art, Washington and the Smithsonian Institution. Her work is included in the collections of the National Portrait Gallery, Washington, the Harvard Art Museums and the Seattle Art Museum.
