= The Sherwin Miller Museum of Jewish Art =

Sherwin Miller Museum of Jewish Art
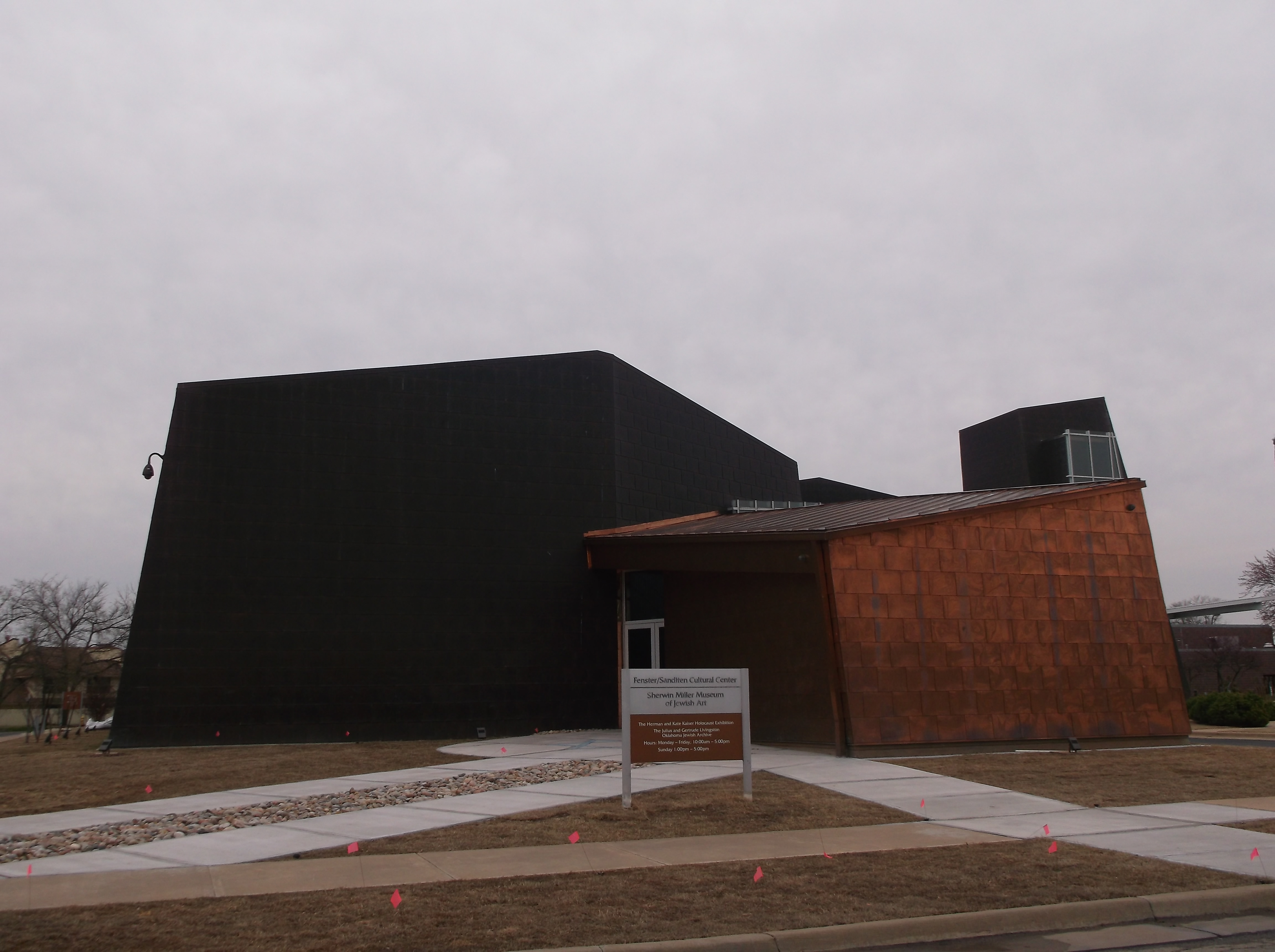
- Sherwin Miller Museum of Jewish Art

- Location within Oklahoma
- Established: 1965
- Location: 2021 E 71st St Tulsa, OK 74136
- Coordinates: 36.062672°N 95.963436°W
- Type: Art museum
- Director: Tracey Herst-Woods
- Website: http://jewishmuseumtulsa.org/

The Sherwin Miller Museum of Jewish Art (SMMJA) in Tulsa, Oklahoma, was founded in 1966 as the Gershon & Rebecca Fenster Museum of Jewish Art. From its inception until 1998, Tulsa's Congregation B'nai Emunah Synagogue housed the museum. Sherwin Miller was the museum's first curator. In 2000, the museum was renamed the Sherwin Miller Museum, and it moved to its present location at 2021 E 71st St in Tulsa, OK 74136 on the Zarrow Campus of the Jewish Federation of Tulsa in November 2004. The Sherwin Miller Museum, which houses the largest collection of Jewish art in the Southwestern United States, received accreditation by the American Alliance of Museums in 2013.

== Collections and exhibits ==
The museum is a part of the Fenster/Sanditen Cultural Center along with the National Council of Jewish Women Holocaust Education Center, dedicated in April 1995 on Yom HaShoah by members of the Oklahoma 45th Infantry Division. It is the only American Jewish museum in the region and preserves the largest collection of Judaica in the Southwest United States. It serves as the headquarters of the Jewish Historical Society of Oklahoma and Oklahoma Jewish Archives. The Herman & Kate Kaiser Holocaust Collection focuses on survivors who came to live in Oklahoma and those Oklahomans helped to liberate the Nazi concentration camps. The museum's permanent collection consists of more than 16,000 pieces, including items of archaeological and ritual significance, ethnographic costumes, synagogue textiles, historical documents, and fine art. The museum opened

== Facility description ==
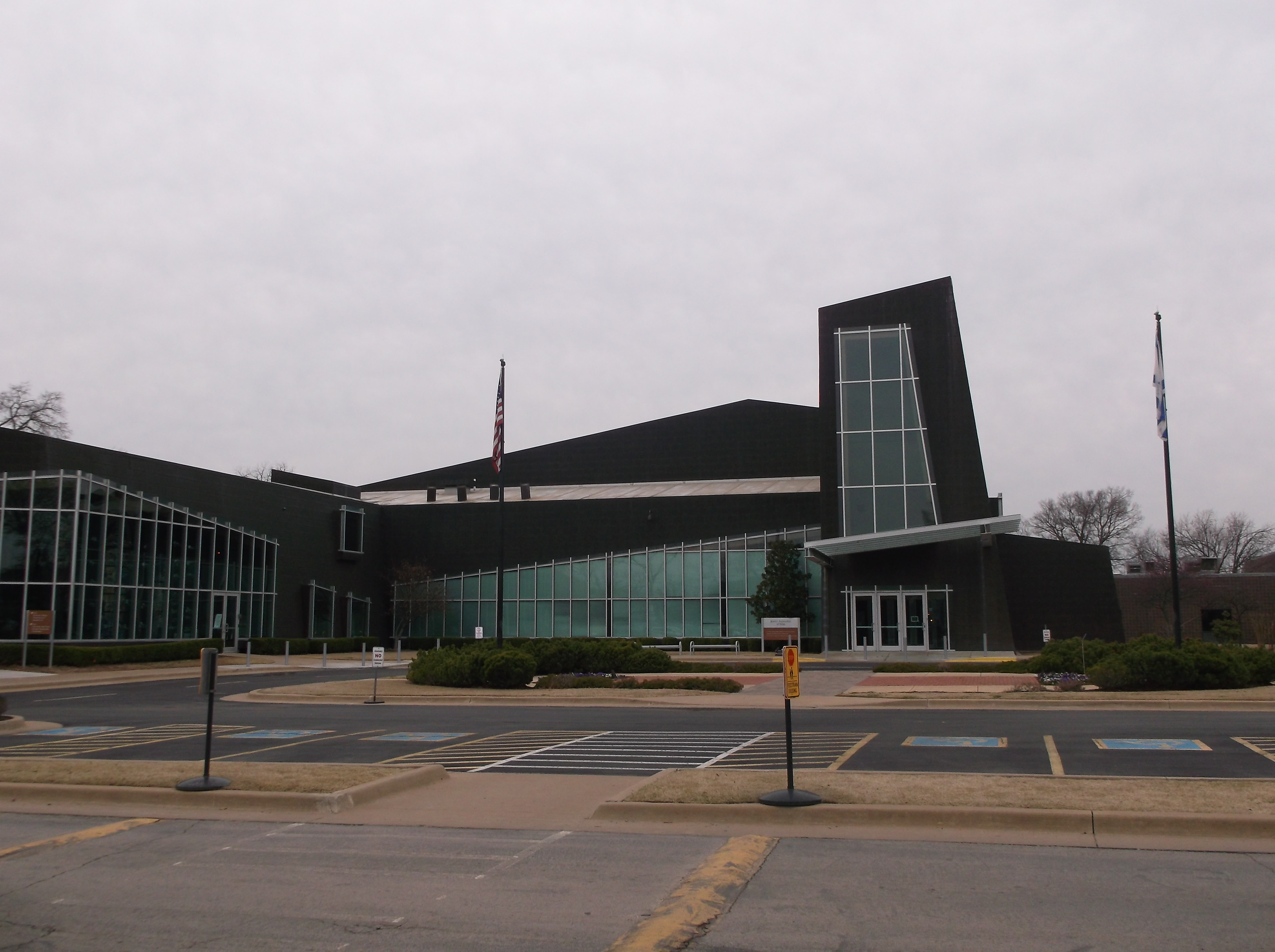
Museum building as viewed from parking lot.

The museum building contains 13,700 square feet (1,270 m^{2}) of exhibit space. It even contains a model synagogue that is used for services twice a week by children from the Mizel Jewish Community Day School, also located on the Zarrow Campus. (Note: The model synagogue contains furnishings from the former Beth Ahaba synagogue of Muskogee, Oklahoma.)

The building has two levels:

- The lower level has a permanent Holocaust exhibit that displays documents, photos and other mementos from Oklahoma veterans who liberated German concentration camps, Jewish refugees from Nazi Germany, and Holocaust victims and survivors.
- The upper level exhibits art and artifacts related to the history of the Jewish people, ranging from the pre-Canaanite period in the Middle East to Jewish settlements in Oklahoma.

The museum opened its new Holocaust Center in November 2020 after three years of planning and construction. Mikel Yantz, said its purpose is "... to teach about the Holocaust. Why it happened, when it happened, and those who were affected, and how it affects us today," In addition, there are also displays about the Muscogee Creek "Trail of Tears" and the 1921 Tulsa Race Massacre." Yantz also noted that it is the only museum of its kind in Oklahoma.

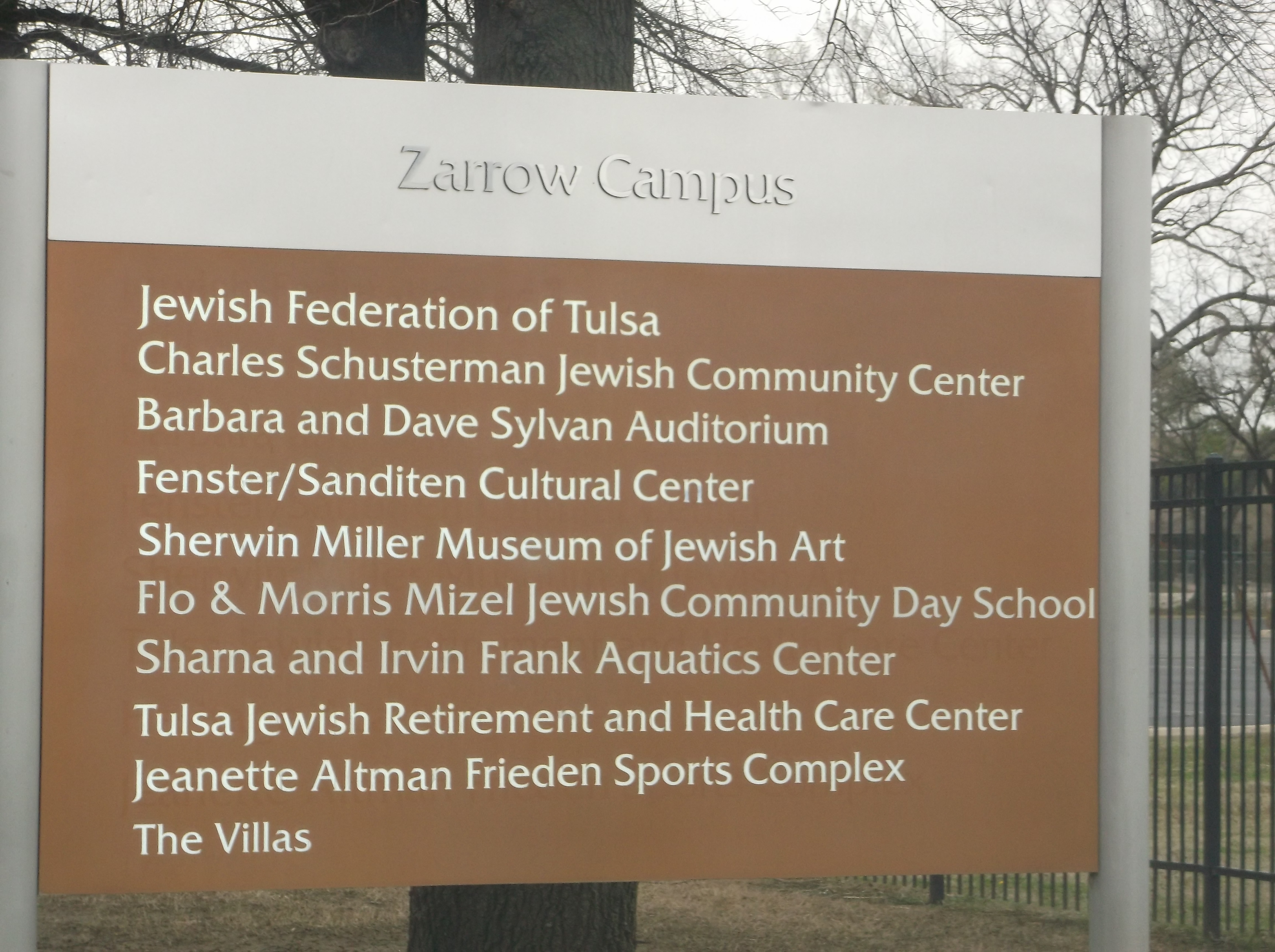
Zarrow Campus in Tulsa

== Vandalism ==
In February 2021, five Holocaust tribute statues which were part of an outdoor display created by the museum to remember children murdered during the Holocaust were destroyed by vandals.

== See also ==
- List of museums in Oklahoma
