= Midgley Museum =

Museum in Oklahoma, United States

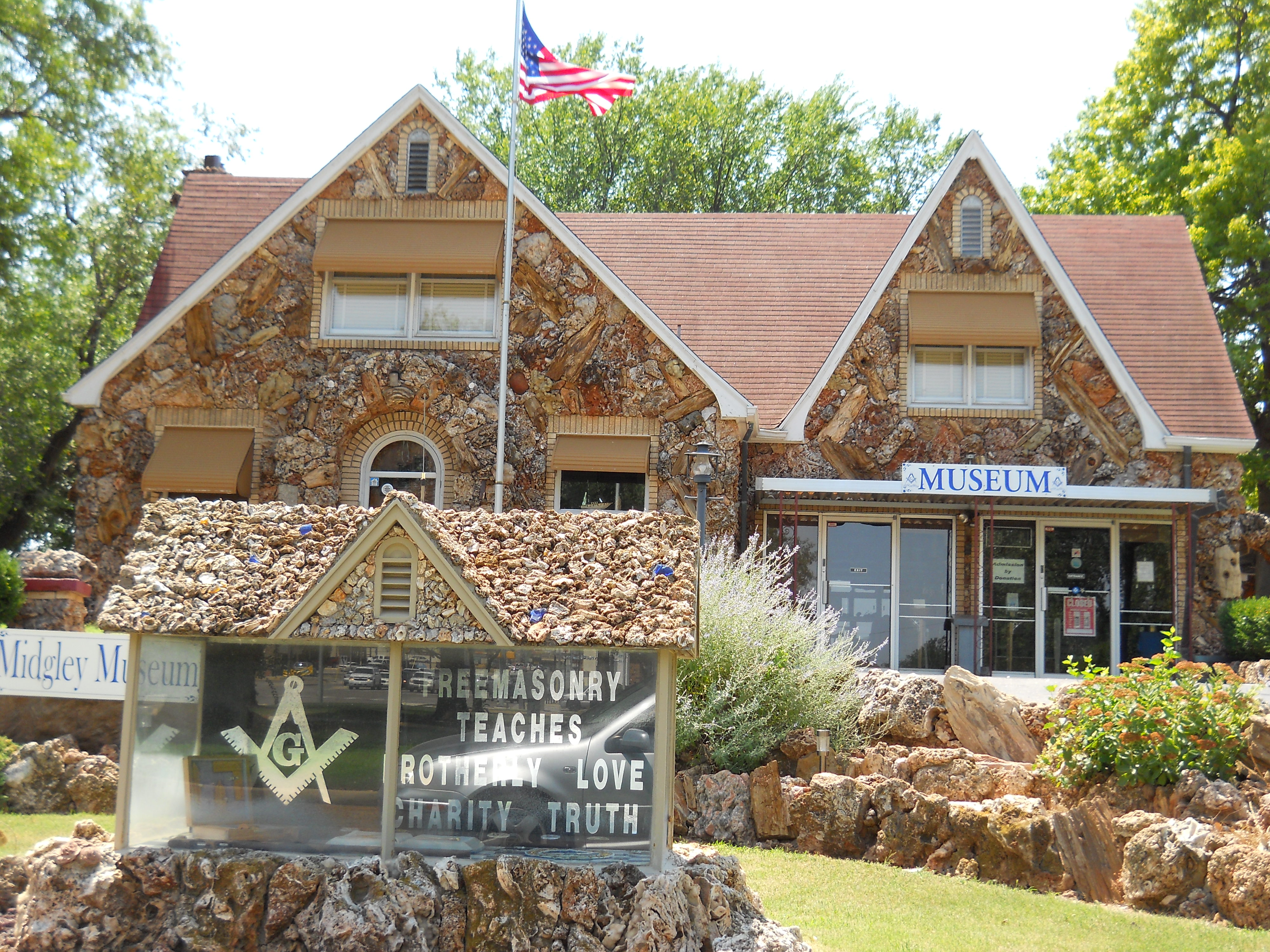
- Location: 1001 Sequoyah Drive; Enid, Oklahoma, United States
- Coordinates: 36.3895°N 97.8905°W
- Website: http://www.midgleymuseum.org/

The Midgley Museum is a city-owned museum located in the city of Enid, Oklahoma.

The museum's exhibits include a large mineral and rock collection that features a 7,000-pound petrified stump and fluorescent rocks that must be viewed under a black light. The museum is operated by the Northwest Oklahoma Masonic Lodges.

== History ==
The items displayed in the museum were collected by the Midgley family that came to the United States from England in the 1870s. Wheat and hay farmers, the Midgleys collected exotic rocks while traveling to sell their harvests.

The family commissioned Texas stonemasons to construct a home from rocks they had excavated. They donated their collections and the home as a museum to the city of Enid.

== Exhibits ==
The house itself is a large part of the display, as it is made from the rocks and minerals the Midgleys collected over the years. In the front yard, there is a 7,000-pound petrified tree stump found near Woodward, Oklahoma. The fireplace is made from priceless fossil stone and a glass-encased gypsum selenite, the largest removed from Oklahoma's Salt Plains National Wildlife Refuge.

The entire mineral and rock collection includes more than 30 types of exotic rocks, fossil stones, crystal, agate, sandstone, and petrified wood.

=== Black light room ===
A closet in the house is filled with fluorescent rocks on display under a black light.

=== Trophy room ===
The trophy room includes a stuffed buffalo, Royal Canadian elk, and a moose, and javelinas.
