= Oklahoma History Center =

History museum in Oklahoma City

Coordinates: 35.4940°N 97.4999°W

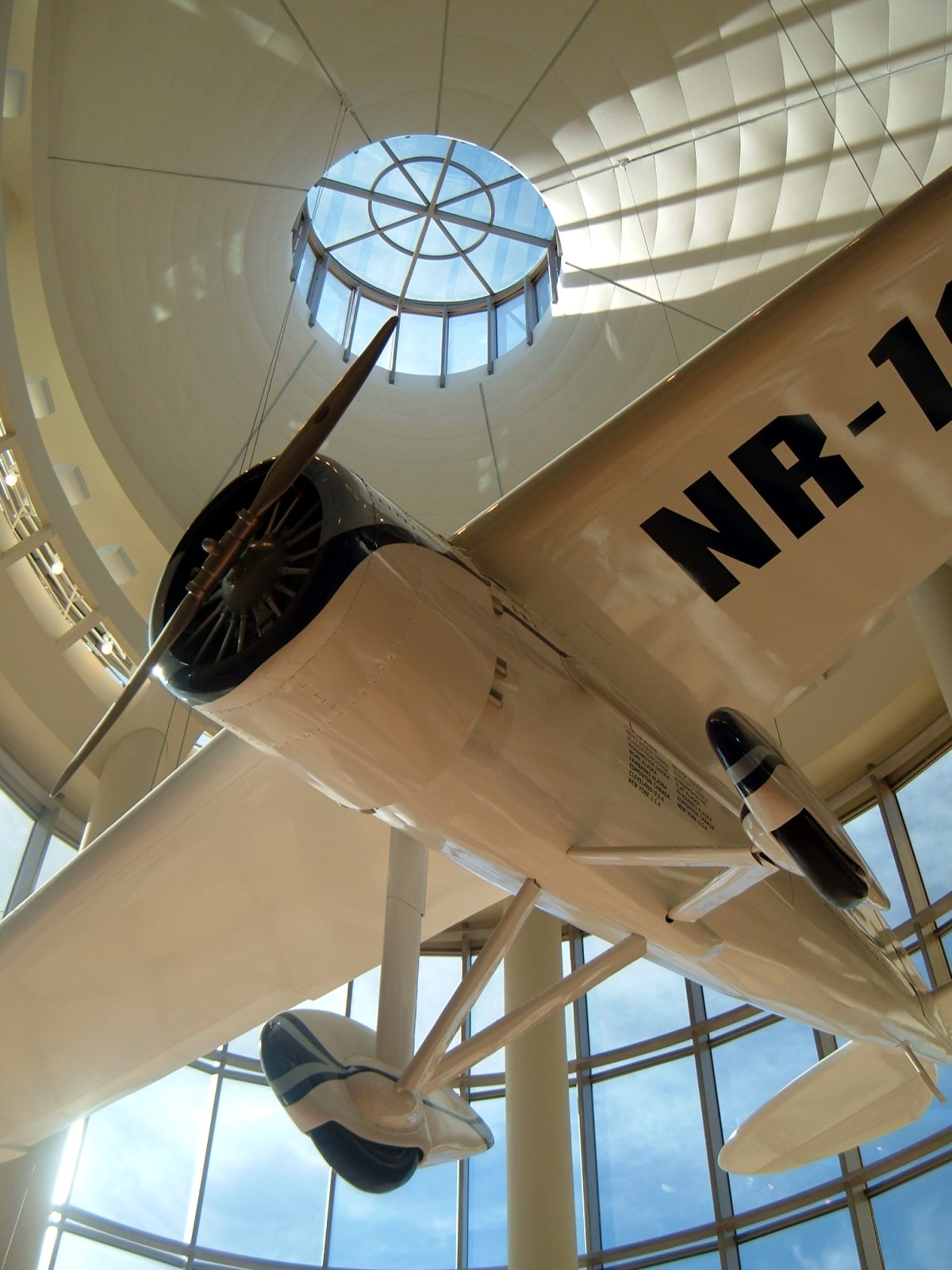
A replica of Oklahoma aviator Wiley Post's Winnie Mae hangs in the atrium of the Oklahoma History Center.

The Oklahoma History Center (OHC) is the history museum of the state of Oklahoma. Located on an 18-acre (7.3 ha) plot across the street from the Governor's mansion at 800 Nazih Zuhdi Drive in Oklahoma City, the current museum opened in 2005 and is operated by the Oklahoma Historical Society (OHS). It focuses on the history of Oklahoma.

== Galleries and exhibits ==
The museum contains several galleries. The Inasmuch Foundation Gallery focuses on culture and the arts; cultural diversity; images of Oklahoma; sports; voice; radio and television; vacuum tubes; and Wild West shows. The ONEOK Gallery contains exhibits and presentations aimed at representing all 39 American Indian tribes currently associated with Oklahoma, describing the modern-day Indian experience as a bridge between the past and the present. The exhibits include artifacts, tribal music, photographic images, Indian art, and oral histories from the Indian tribes of Oklahoma.

The Kerr-McGee Gallery includes items from an 1830s riverboat recently excavated from the Red River, examples of Oklahoma's entrepreneurial history, and a 3-D reconstruction of an oil derrick. It also includes exhibits and sections on the African American experience; business; military matters; natural resources; the oil and gas industry; people and pathways; and transportation.

The Noble Foundation Gallery sections include education; farming and ranching; fashions; government and politics; kitchens; the Dust Bowl; land runs; law and order; urban frontiers; and weather.

The Gaylord Special Exhibit Gallery contains the Skylab 4 command module and various artifacts related to Oklahomans in space, including personal items and flight suits worn by Gordon Cooper, Fred Haise, John Herrington, Shannon Lucid, and Stuart Roosa. Two Moon rocks, one from Apollo 11 and one from Apollo 17, are also displayed.

== Special events ==
Each year, the Oklahoma History Center hosts the Oklahoma State Level History Day Competition, the second part of a three-stage (district, state, and national) competition called National History Day. Middle- and high school students can enter documentaries, historical papers, websites, exhibit boards, or performances on a topic that the students choose that relate to each year's theme. Students' projects are judged and advance to the national competition if they place first or second in their category.

== Gallery ==
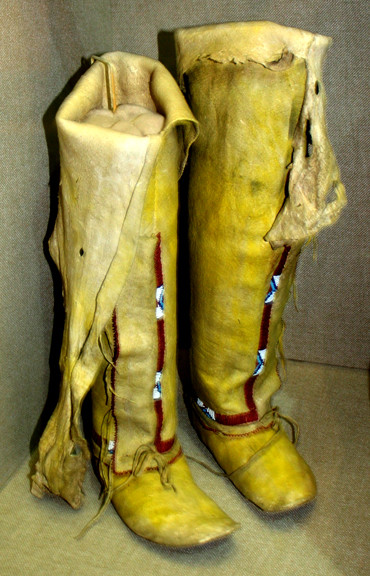
Arapaho leggings and moccasins, ca. 1910

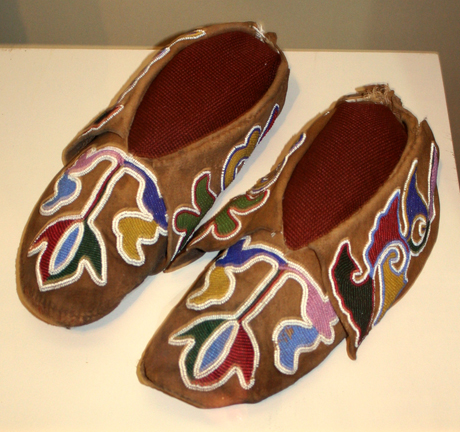
Otoe-Missouria beaded moccasins, ca. 1880

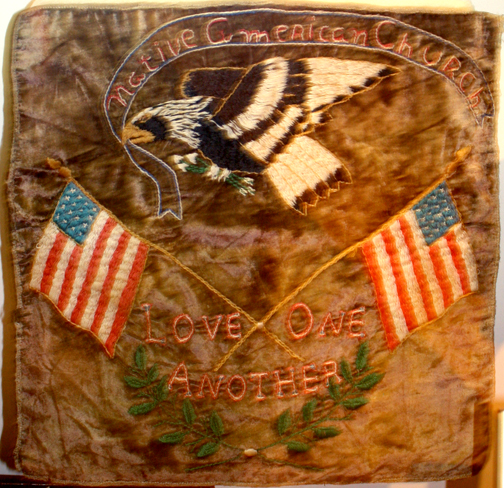
Shawnee Native American Church altar cloth

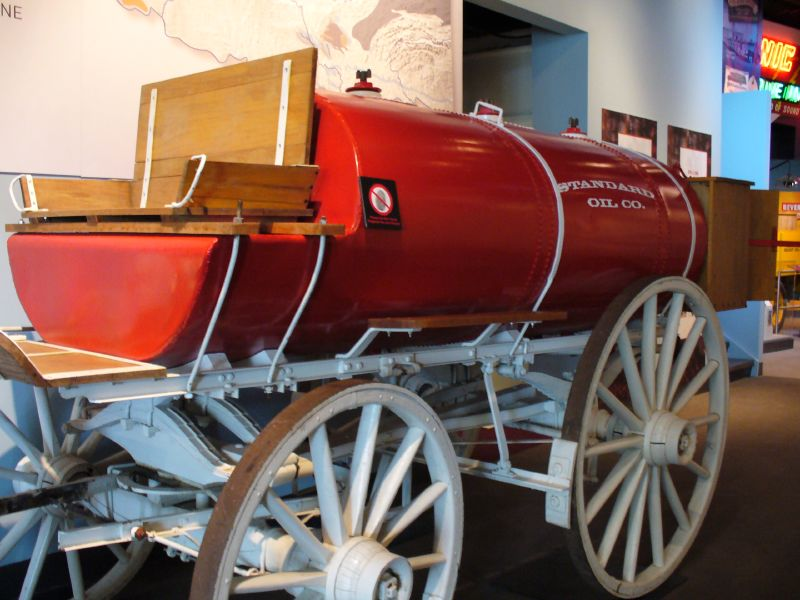
Standard Oil tank truck

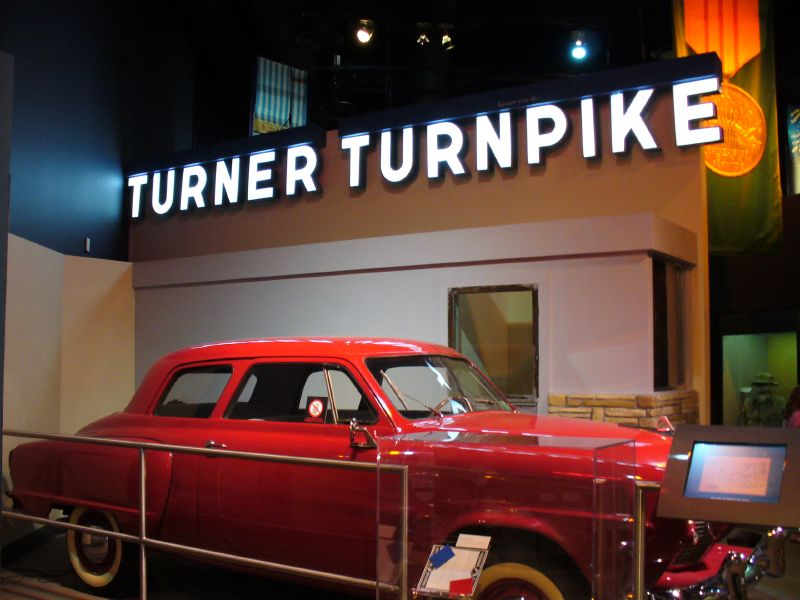
Turner Turnpike display

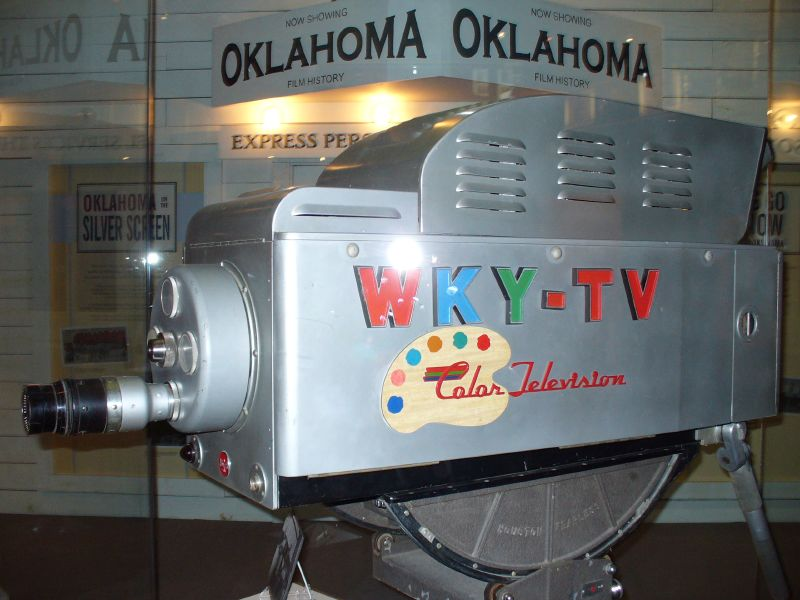
Early color TV camera, WKY-TV

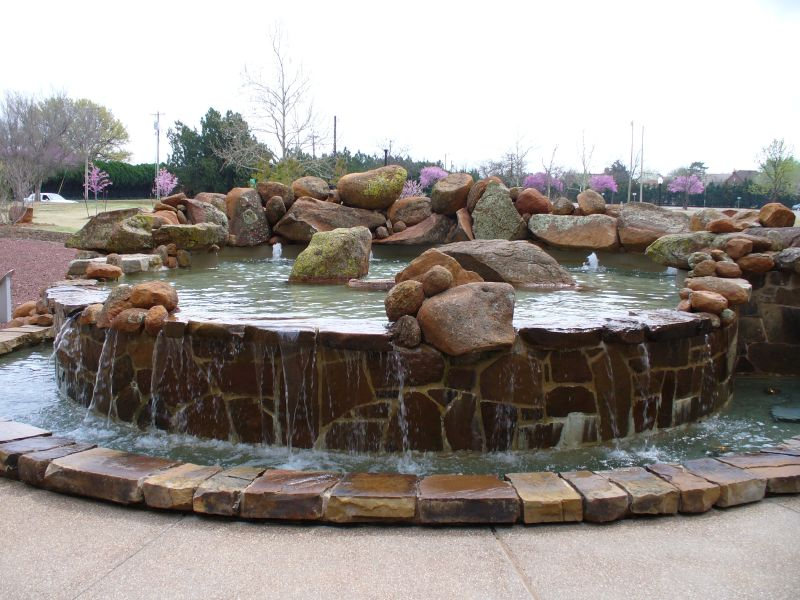
Fountain on OHS ground using native stones

== See also ==
- List of historical societies in Oklahoma
