= Three Valley Museum =

Coordinates: 33°59′29″N 96°22′48″W

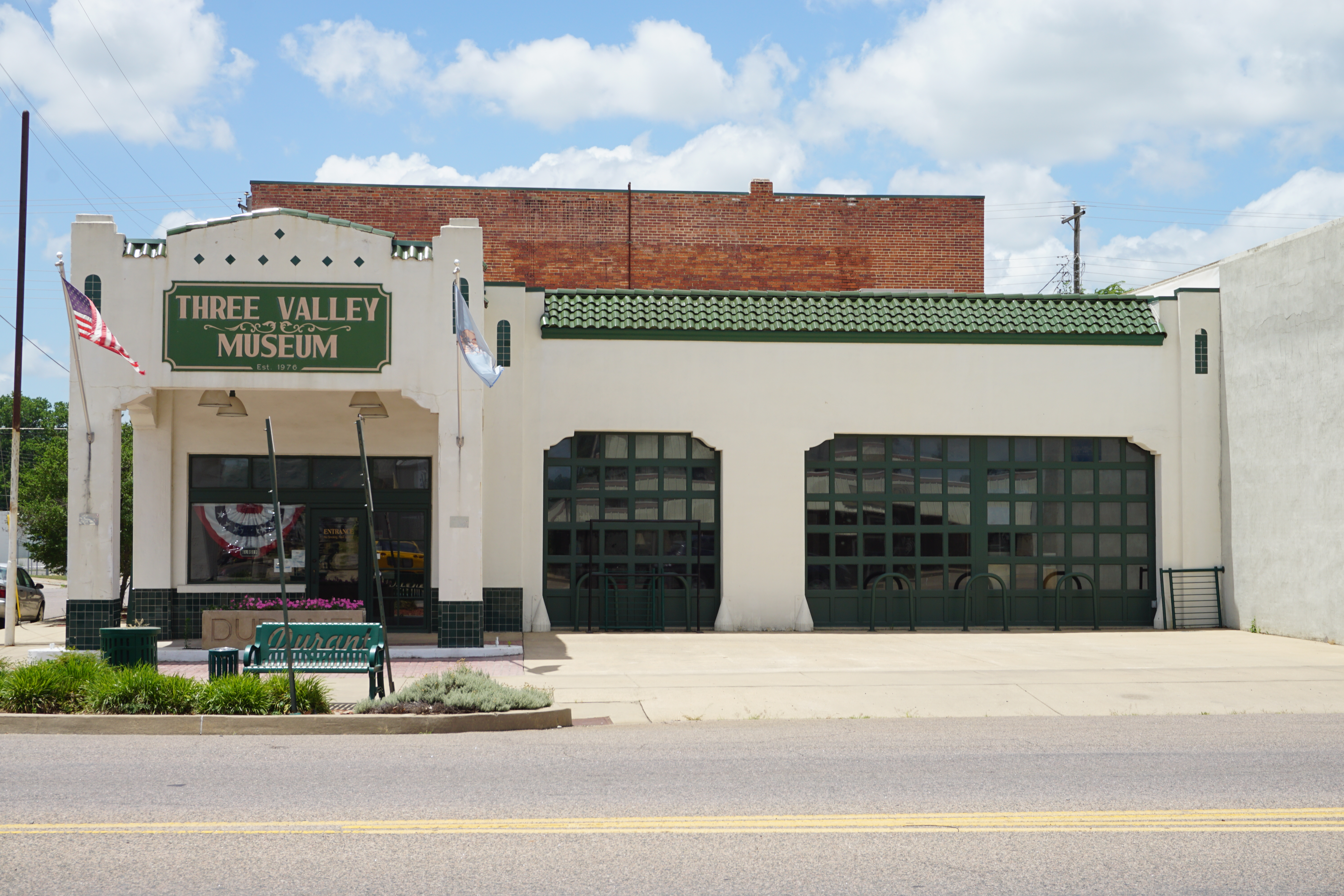
Three Valley Museum

The Three Valley Museum is a non-profit museum in Durant, Oklahoma. It houses a collection of artifacts regarding the history of Bryan County. It opened in 1976. It is named after the book Queen of the Three Valleys by Henry McCreary, which is about Durant. The museum is operated by the Durant Historical Society.

== Exhibits ==
The museum shows Bryan County from its start in 1873 to the present. The museum's exhibits include a small town exhibit area on the second floor depicting more than 20 businesses and scenes from the early 1900s, including an early law office, doctor's office, child's room, parlor, and general store. Other exhibits include area transportation history and a Native American Gallery, highlighting the Indian tribes that are located in southeast Oklahoma.
