= Pawnee Bill =

American stunt performer (1860–1942)

Gordon William Lillie
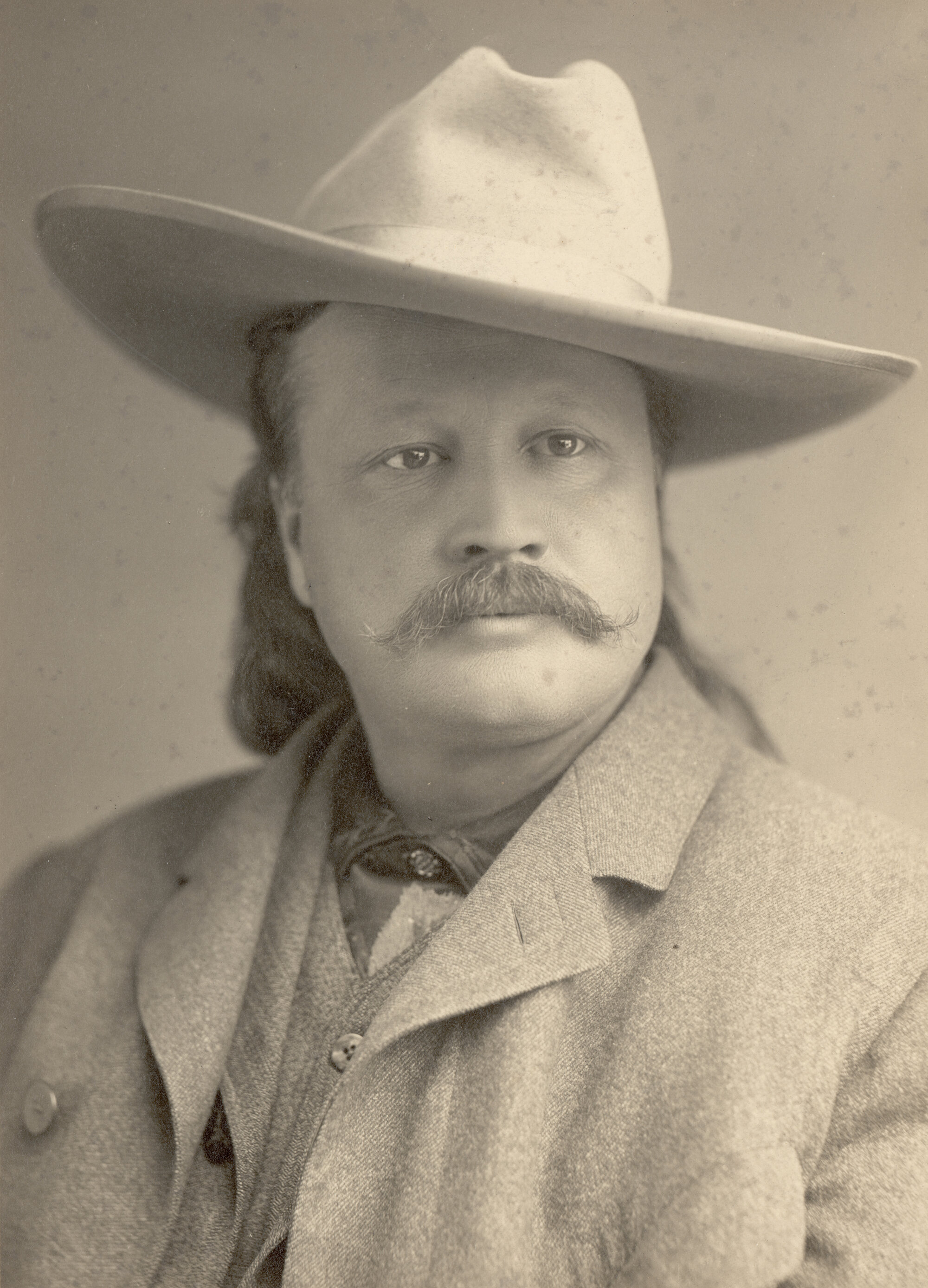
- Born: February 14, 1860; Bloomington, Illinois
- Died: February 3, 1942 (aged 81); Pawnee, Oklahoma
- Other name: Pawnee Bill
- Occupation: Wild West Show performer
- Spouse: May Lillie (m.1886–1936, her death)

Gordon William Lillie (February 14, 1860 – February 3, 1942), known professionally as Pawnee Bill, was an American showman and performer who specialized in Wild West shows and was known for his short partnership with William "Buffalo Bill" Cody. In 2010, he was inducted into the Hall of Great Westerners of the National Cowboy & Western Heritage Museum.

== Early life and family ==
Pawnee Bill was born on February 14, 1860, in Bloomington, Illinois. His father Newton operated a flour mill in Bloomington; the mill burned to the ground in 1876. The family then moved to Wellington, Kansas, where Gordon developed a love for the West. By the age of 19, he was working on the Pawnee Indian agency in Indian Territory. In 1883, he was given the chance to work as the Pawnee interpreter with Buffalo Bill's Wild West Show. His work with the show was the origin of his nickname as "Pawnee Bill".

== Wild West show ==
Poster for Pawnee Bill's Historic Wild West.

After courting for two years, Lillie married May Manning in 1886, a petite Quaker from Pennsylvania, who was younger by nine years, a graduate of Smith College, and the daughter of a wealthy Philadelphia physician. At first, her parents objected to their refined young daughter marrying a cowboy, but eventually they agreed to the union.

In 1888, the Lillies launched their own Wild West show, which they called "Pawnee Bill’s Historic Wild West". May starred in the show as the "Champion Girl Horseback Shot of the West." Their first season was a financial disaster where they re-organized as a smaller operation called "Pawnee Bill’s Historical Wild West Indian Museum and Encampment Show." That show was popular and financially successful. Lillie added Jose Barrera to the cast; he was widely popular performing as "Mexican Joe". Mamie Francis performed with Pawnee Bill's from 1901 to 1905. In 1907, Lillie hired performers from a variety of backgrounds. The show included Mexican cowboys, Pawnee, Japanese performers, and Arab jugglers. The ensemble debuted as "Pawnee Bill’s Great Far East Show."

In 1908, Pawnee Bill and Buffalo Bill joined forces and created the "Two Bills' show. That show was foreclosed on when it was playing in Denver, Colorado.

While Gordon Lillie had been on tour, May supervised their buffalo ranch, now known as Pawnee Bill Ranch. The Lillies completed work on their Arts-and-Crafts style home on Blue Hawk Peak in 1910.

== Later life ==
Pawnee Bill invested in banking, real estate, and oil. He operated various business interests and dabbled in filmmaking at his ranch. In 1930, May and Pawnee Bill opened Pawnee Bill’s Old Town near the ranch. They sold Indian and Mexican crafts, and featured annual rodeos. That enterprise burned to the ground in the 1940s and was never rebuilt.

In 1936, the couple celebrated their 50th wedding anniversary in Taos, New Mexico. In September of that year they attended a local celebration in Tulsa, Oklahoma. While driving back to their ranch that night, Pawnee Bill lost control of their vehicle. May died as a result of her injuries, and Pawnee Bill never fully recovered. He died in his sleep on February 3, 1942, at the age of 81 in his home outside of Pawnee, Oklahoma.

== Legacy ==
The Pawnee Bill Ranch continues to exist, including a museum. The Pawnee Bill Memorial Rodeo is held annually, as is a version of Pawnee Bill’s Original Wild West Show.
