= Oklahoma Museum of Flying =

- Location within Oklahoma
- Location: Bethany, Oklahoma
- Coordinates: 35.5335°N 97.6382°W
- Type: Aviation museum
- Founder: Brent "Doc" Hisey
- Website: Official website (archived)

The Oklahoma Museum of Flying is an aviation museum located at Wiley Post Airport in Bethany, Oklahoma.

== History ==
Brent "Doc" Hisey, a neurosurgeon, acquired the P-51D Miss America from the Museum of Flying in 1992. The museum acquired a B-25 in 2013.

== Collection ==
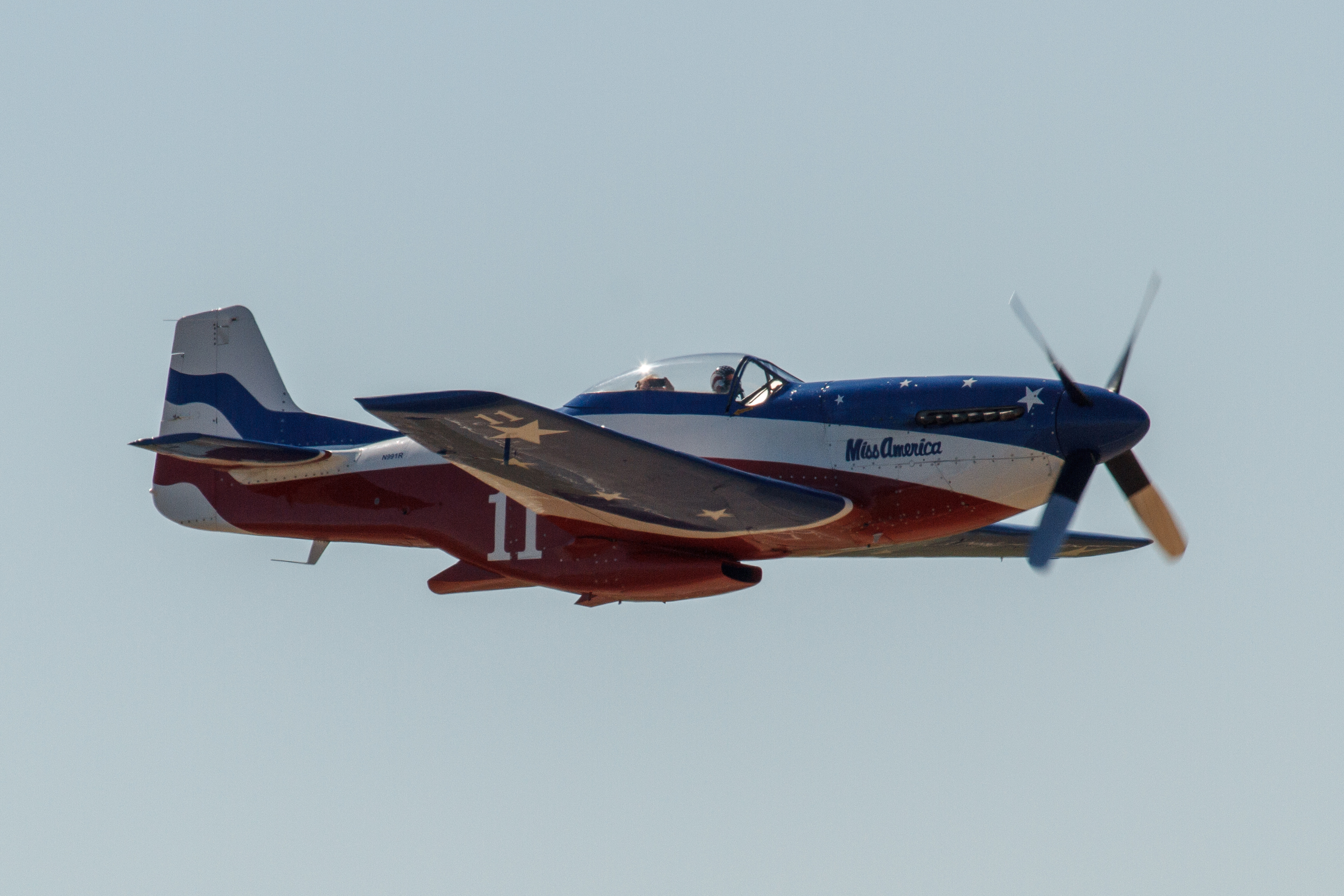
The museum's P-51D at the Alliance Air Show in Ft. Worth, Texas

- Aero L-39 Albatros
- Cessna L-19E Bird Dog
- Fokker E.III – replica
- North American TB-25J Mitchell
- North American P-51C Mustang
- North American P-51D Mustang
- North American T-28C Trojan
