= Oklahoma Historical Society =

Historical preservation agency in the state of Oklahoma

- Oklahoma Historical Society logo

Agency overview
- Formed: May 27, 1893
- Headquarters: 800 Nazih Zuhdi Drive Oklahoma City
- Employees: 180
- Annual budget: $20 million
- Minister responsible: Matt Pinnell, Oklahoma Secretary of Tourism and Branding
- Agency executive: Trait Thompson, Executive Director
- Website: Oklahoma Historical Society

The Oklahoma Historical Society (OHS) is an agency of the government of Oklahoma dedicated to promotion and preservation of Oklahoma's history and its people by collecting, interpreting, and disseminating knowledge and artifacts of Oklahoma. The mission of the OHS is to collect, preserve, and share the history and culture of the state of Oklahoma and its people.

The society has the rare distinction of being both a Smithsonian Institution and National Archives and Records Administration affiliate.

== History ==
The OHS was formed in May 1893, 14 years before Oklahoma became a state, by the Territorial Press Association. The initial function of the OHS was to collect and distribute newspapers published in Oklahoma Territory. The society was declared an agency of the territorial government in 1895, and it became an official state government agency when Oklahoma reached statehood in 1907. The OHS is both a private, membership organization and an Oklahoma government agency. The OHS Board of Directors is made up of 25 members, 12 of whom are appointed by the governor and 13 elected by OHS members to three-year terms.

== Functions ==
The OHS today works statewide and nationally to preserve and nurture Oklahoma's history. The Oklahoma State Historic Preservation Office, also operated by the OHS, carries out federal preservation programs in Oklahoma under the National Historic Preservation Act, to preserve Oklahoma's significant buildings, parks, objects, and sites. Projects are carried out in partnership with the Department of the Interior and the National Park Service, as well as other state and local governments, groups, and interested people. The society posts markers at historical sites.

Annual membership can be purchased for individuals, families, and institutions.

== Publications ==
The OHS has published The Chronicles of Oklahoma, the society's scholarly journal, since 1921 and continues to issue four editions per year. The society's monthly newsletter, Mistletoe Leaves, includes information about OHS activities and historical happenings throughout Oklahoma. Both publications and other historical works are available by subscription or per issue. The OHS has also published numerous other titles including The Encyclopedia of Oklahoma History and Culture.

More than 380 issues of The Chronicles of Oklahoma are available online for free through The Gateway to Oklahoma History. The Encyclopedia of Oklahoma History and Culture is available on the society's website.

== Archives and collections ==
The OHS Research Division houses more than 9 million photographs, more than 1 million pages of historical documents and manuscripts, 3,000 oral histories, historic film and video collections, and more than 4,400 titles of newspapers on available microfilm.

Many of the Oklahoma Historical Society's documents and materials are available online at little or no charge, including indexes to the Dawes Rolls, Oklahoma military deaths, the 1890 Oklahoma Territorial Census, Territorial Incorporation Records, Hastain's Township Plats of the Creek Nation, Oklahoma County marriage records 1889–1951, Daily Oklahoman obituaries, and Smith’s First Directory of Oklahoma Territory. The online archives catalog also contains some of the photographs in the OHS Research Division Collection. Historic newspapers are available free of charge on the society's Gateway to Oklahoma History.

== Museums and historic sites ==
=== Oklahoma History Center ===
The society operates the Oklahoma History Center, the state's museum located in Oklahoma City. The Oklahoma History Center occupies 215,000 ft^{2} (19,974m^{2}) and contains more than 2,000 artifacts and exhibits featuring hands-on audio, video, and activities. A museum store is available online or at the Oklahoma History Center.

From 1919 to 1942, Czarina Conlan was in charge of collecting artifacts and documents for the museum from the various Native American tribes throughout the state. The History Center also houses the OHS Research Division, which includes a large Research Center that is free and open to the public.

=== Oklahoma Museum of Popular Culture (OKPOP) ===
In May 2009 the OHS announced plans to build a museum to be called the Oklahoma Museum of Popular Culture, or OKPOP, located in Tulsa's Brady District. It is planned as the state museum of popular culture, including music, television, film and the performing arts. After lengthy delays, funding for the museum was obtained through a $25 million bond issue approved in 2015. In late 2016, the society announced that OKPOP will be located on North Main Street, across the street from Cain's Ballroom.

In May of 2023 the Oklahoma Senate passed a bill to provide $18 million in State funds to help finish the interior and install exhibits, provided the museum could raise a matching $18 million by November 15, 2024.

=== Other locations ===
The Oklahoma Historical Society also administers a number of state-owned properties either in their entirety or with interpretive centers:

- Museums
  - Cherokee Strip Regional Heritage Center
  - Museum of the Western Prairie
  - Oklahoma History Center
  - Oklahoma Route 66 Museum
  - Oklahoma Territorial Museum and Carnegie Library
  - Pioneer Woman Museum and Statue
  - Spiro Mounds Archaeological Center
  - White Hair Memorial
  - Will Rogers Memorial Museum
- Historic Homes
  - Pawnee Bill Ranch and Museum
  - Fred and Addie Drummond Home
  - Hunter's Home
  - Sod House
- Military Sites
  - Cabin Creek Battlefield
  - Fort Gibson Historic Site
  - Fort Towson Historic Site
  - Honey Springs Battlefield
- Affiliates
  - Atoka Museum and Civil War Cemetery
  - Cherokee Strip Museum and Rose Hill School
  - The Chisholm
  - Fort Supply Historic Site
  - Henry and Anna Overholser Mansion
  - Oklahoma State Capitol Museum
  - Tom Mix Museum

Until 2017, it also operated the Frank and Jane Phillips House in Bartlesville.

== Leadership ==
The Oklahoma Historical Society is under the supervision of the Oklahoma Secretary of Tourism and Branding. Under Governor of Oklahoma Kevin Stitt, Matt Pinnell is serving as the secretary.

=== Board of directors ===
The OHS is governed by a 25-member board of directors. Thirteen of those members are elected by the members of the society and twelve are appointed by the governor of Oklahoma, with the approval of the Oklahoma Senate. All members serve three-year terms. The governor also serves as an ex officio member of the board. The board is responsible for appointing an executive director of the society, who serves concurrently as the state historic preservation officer. The current executive director is Trait Thompson.

== See also ==
- List of historical societies in Oklahoma
