= May Lillie =

American entertainer (1869–1936)

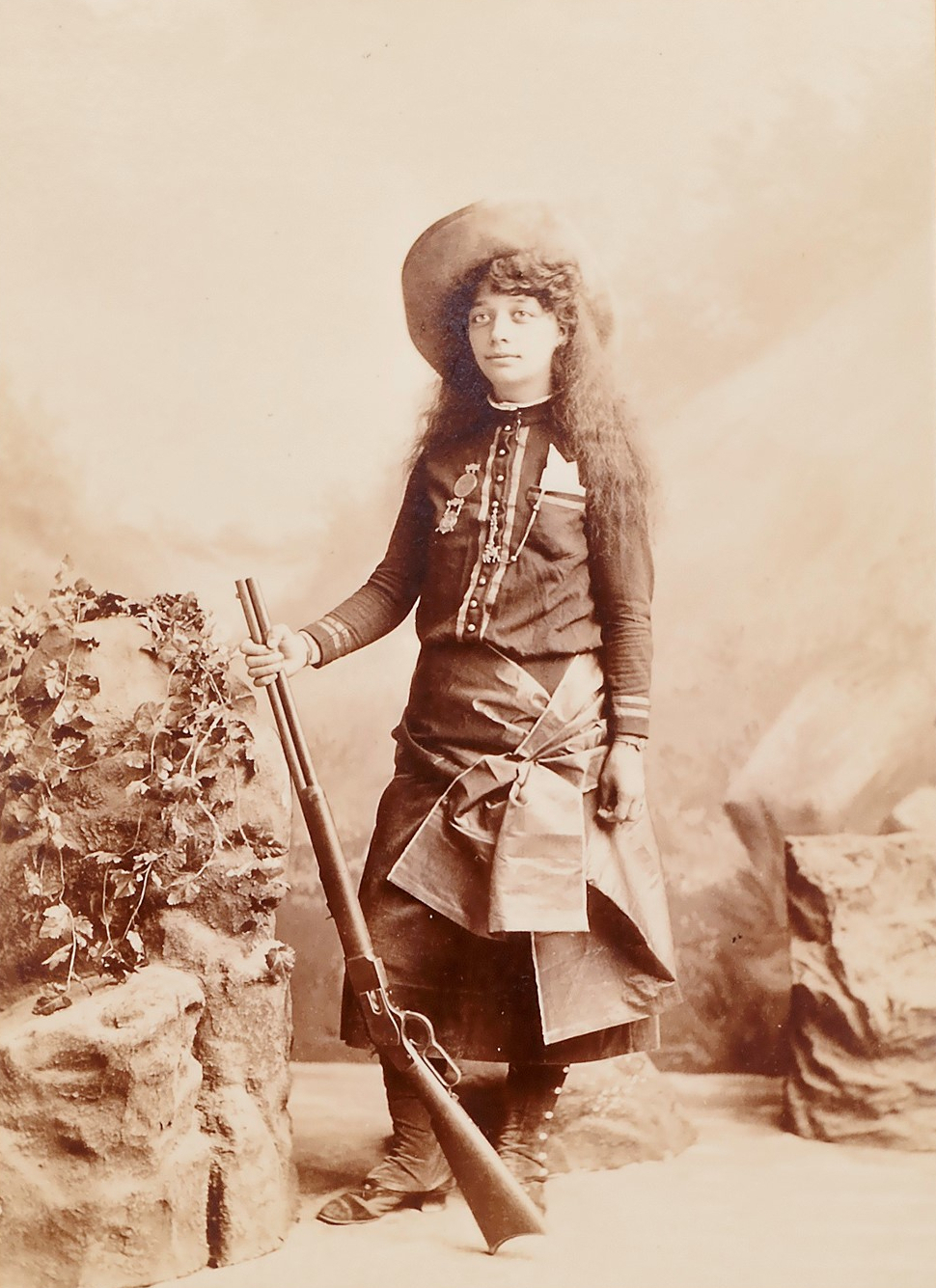
- Born: Mary Emma Manning; March 12, 1869; Philadelphia, Pennsylvania, U.S.
- Died: September 17, 1936 (aged 67); Pawnee, Oklahoma, U.S.
- Other names: Mary E. Manning
- Occupation: Wild West show performer
- Spouse: Gordon William Lillie (m. 1886)

Mary Emma "May" Manning Lillie (March 12, 1869 – September 17, 1936) was an American sharpshooter and equestrian.

== Biography ==
Mary Manning was born on March 12, 1869, in Philadelphia, Pennsylvania. Her parents were physician William R. and Mary Manning. May had two sisters, Elmira, and Elizabeth Manning and a younger brother, William B. Manning. May also had three half-brothers: Samuel, Edward and Albert Eager. May met Gordon William Lillie who became famous as Pawnee Bill while attending Smith College in 1886, they married at her parents’ home in Philadelphia later that year.

Gordon Lillie's wedding gift to his bride was a pony and a Marlin .22 target rifle. In 1887 May debuted at a sharpshooter for Pawnee Bill's Great Wild West Show and was billed as 'the greatest Lady Horseback Rifle-shot of the World'. May traveled the country with her husband's show and was one of the first women to perform as an equestrian and shooter in American Wild West shows. May suffered a shooting injury during an act in 1899 that required two of her fingers to be amputated. While on tour in 1907, May gave a speech to women in Chicago, she said: "Let any normally healthy woman who is ordinarily strong screw up her courage and tackle a bucking bronco, and she will find the most fascinating pastime in the field of feminine athletic endeavor. There is nothing to compare, to increase the joy of living, and once accomplished, she’ll have more real fun than any pink tea or theater party or ballroom ever yielded."

Eventually, May and Gordon settled in Pawnee, Oklahoma, on Blue Hawk Peak. They built a cabin, established a buffalo herd, and, in 1910, completed work on their Arts and Crafts style home. In 1917, May and Gordon adopted a son whom they named Billy. He died in an accident at the ranch in 1925. While her husband was on tour, May was the hands-on manager of the Lillie buffalo ranch. She believed in the buffalo’s importance to the heritage of the American West and to Plains Indian culture. May was active in the Woman's Relief Corps and was a member of the Eastern Star. In 1936 she and her husband celebrated their fiftieth wedding anniversary in Taos, New Mexico. In September of that year, they attended a local celebration in Tulsa, Oklahoma. While driving back to their ranch that night Gordon lost control of their vehicle. May died on September 17, 1936, as a result of injuries sustained in the accident.

In 2011, May Lillie was inducted into the National Cowgirl Hall of Fame for her tireless work during her Wild West show career as well as her role in the preservation of the American bison.
