= Blood Brothers (book) =

Literary nonfiction by Deanne Stillman

Blood Brothers: The Story of the Strange Friendship between Sitting Bull and Buffalo Bill
- Cover of the 2017 Simon and Schuster edition
- Author: Deanne Stillman
- Language: English
- Publication date: 2017

Blood Brothers: The Story of the Strange Friendship between Sitting Bull and Buffalo Bill is a book of literary nonfiction by American author Deanne Stillman, first published in 2017. The book examines the relationship between two legendary figures of the American West, Lakota leader Sitting Bull and showman William "Buffalo Bill" Cody, and their brief collaboration in Buffalo Bill's Wild West show during 1885.

== Overview and historical context ==
Sitting Bull and Buffalo Bill were presented as "Foes in '76, Friends in '85", which was a reference to their adversarial roles in the Battle of Little Bighorn almost a decade earlier. Stillman traces both men's earlier lives and their eventual intersection, providing context about the Great Plains, battles between Native Americans and the U.S. military, and the rise of celebrity culture in late 19th-century America.

== Reception and awards ==
Blood Brothers received a starred review in Kirkus, was called "Splendid" in Austin Chronicle, appeared on True West Magazine's, "History Books Not to Miss" list among others, and won the 2018 Ohioana Book Award for Nonfiction. Reviewers commented on the book's blend of storytelling and history, calling it "a thrilling and elegantly written saga" (Douglas Brinkley in a jacket endorsement) and "the right treatment for a subject about which many books have been written before, few so successfully." (Kirkus Reviews). David Krueger's review in the academic journal Western Historical Quarterly, published by the Western History Association, gave a more measured judgement, describing the book as "an entertaining, if highly sentimentalized, account" and noted that the lack of a notation system would limit its research use.

== Author ==
Deanne Stillman is recognized for her works of literary nonfiction. She previously published Twentynine Palms: A True Story of Murder, Marines, and the Mojave, Mustang: The Saga of the Wild Horse in the American West, and Desert Reckoning: A Town Sheriff, a Mojave Hermit, and the Biggest Manhunt in Modern California History.
