= Sitting Bull and Buffalo Bill =

1885 set of photographs

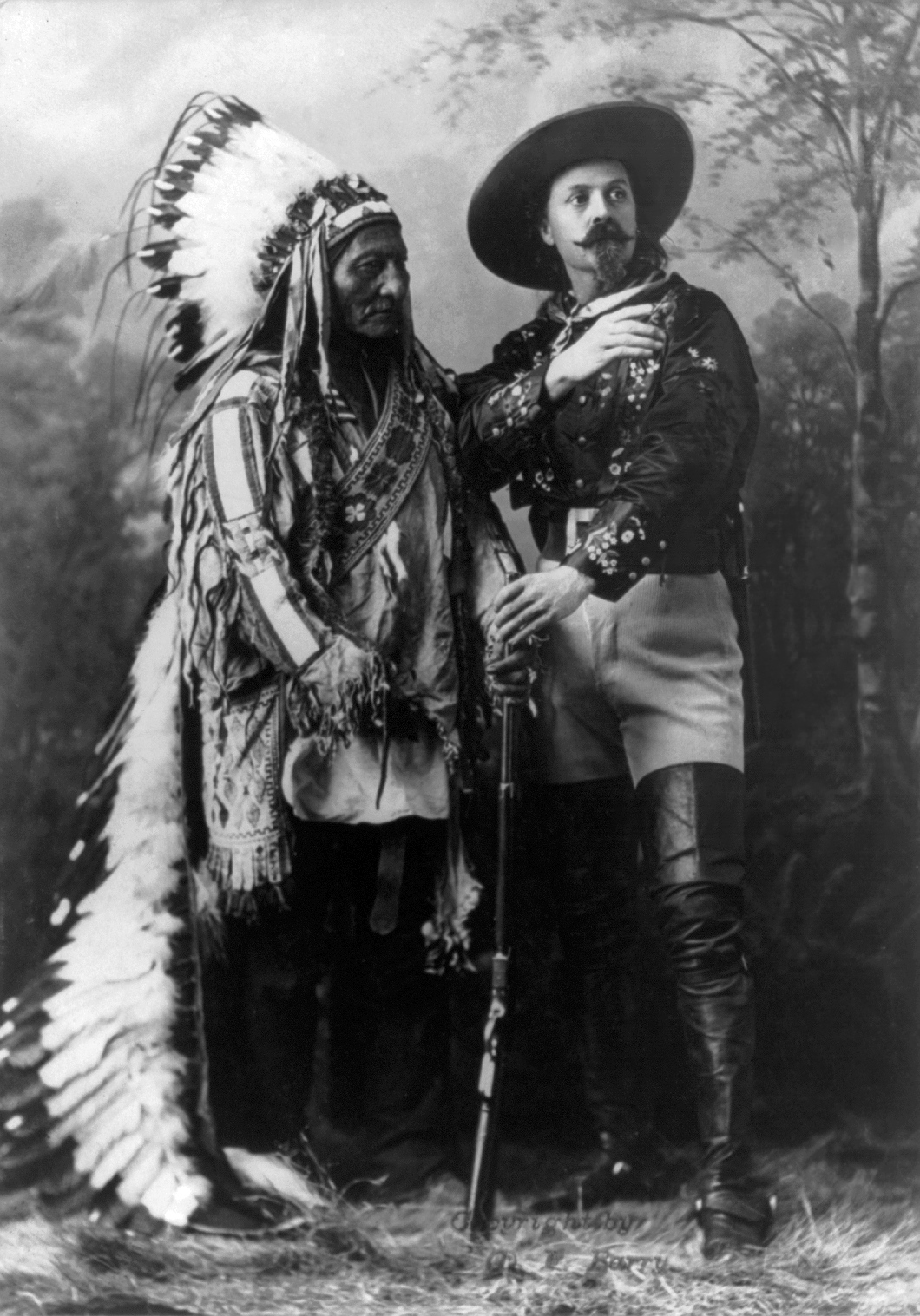
- The series' most widely distributed photograph, often captioned "Enemies in '76, Friends in '85"
- Artist: William Notman & Son
- Year: 1885
- Medium: Photography (silver salts on glass, gelatin dry plate process)
- Location: Montreal, Quebec, Canada

Sitting Bull and Buffalo Bill is a set of studio photographs of the Hunkpapa Lakota leader Sitting Bull and the entertainer Buffalo Bill, taken in Montreal in 1885. The session was held at the studio of William Notman during a North American tour of Buffalo Bill's Wild West, the Wild West show which enrolled Sitting Bull for a single season. The eight joint portraits of Sitting Bull and "Buffalo Bill" Cody were part of a commission for 47 photographs, which were printed and sold as cabinet cards during the tour.

Nine years prior to the session, Sitting Bull and Cody both famously participated in the Great Sioux War of 1876 on opposite sides. For this reason, the most widely distributed of Notman's dual portraits was frequently captioned "Enemies in '76, Friends in '85". It shows Cody pointing to an imagined horizon as he and Sitting Bull jointly hold a Winchester rifle. They are dressed in their archetypal show clothes and stand in front of a painted backdrop of a forest, as in the other dual portraits. Although interpretations of the pose vary, this image is considered emblematic of American history and culture.

Notman's photographs helped establish the trope of the "Cowboys and Indians", a core element of the Western genre. They are also among the last taken of Sitting Bull before his death at the hands of Indian tribal police in 1890. The depiction of his relationship with Cody in Sitting Bull and Buffalo Bill has been analyzed and criticized by scholars as representative of the dynamics of settler colonialism in the United States.

== Background ==
=== Great Sioux War of 1876 ===
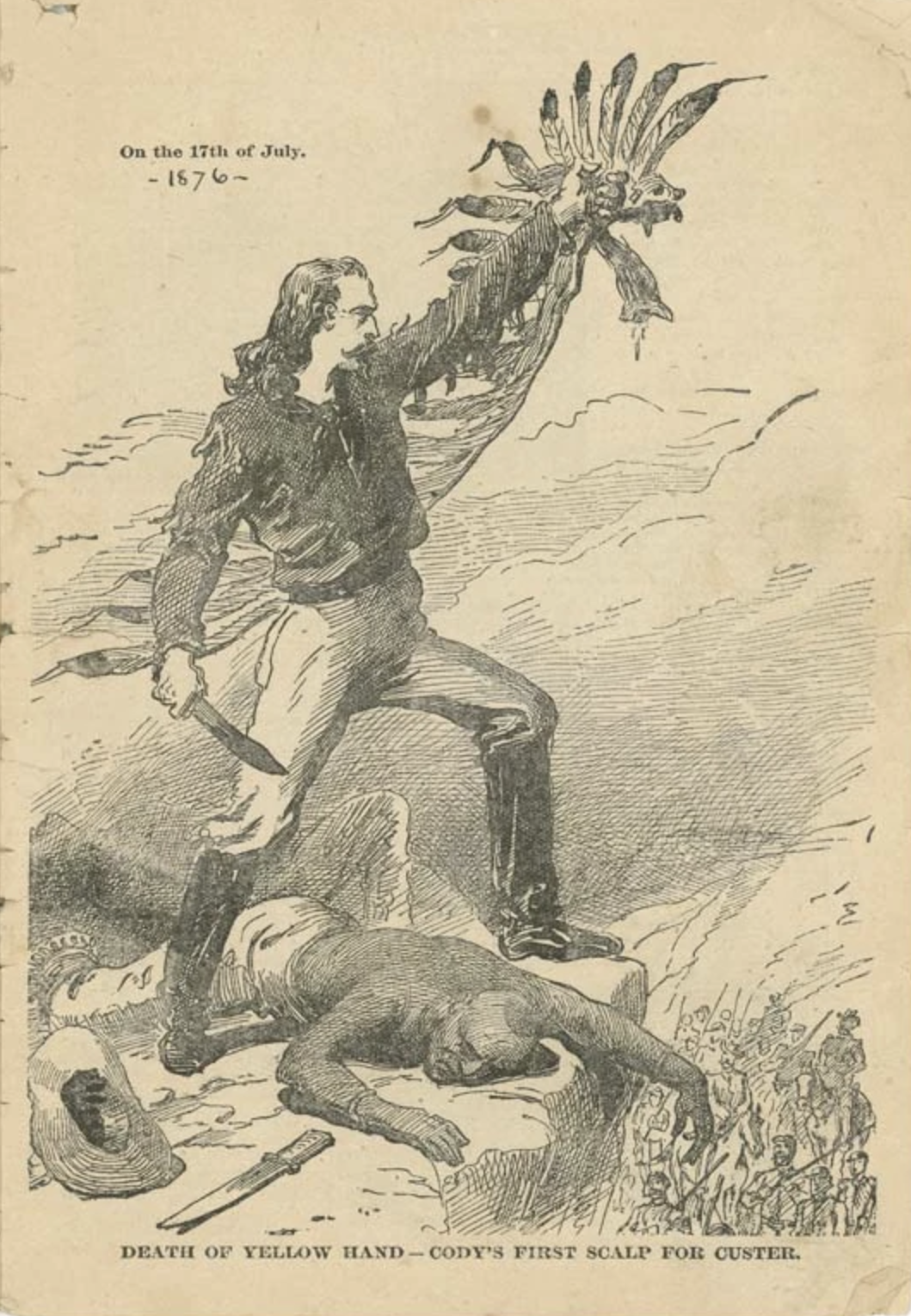
Illustration of the "first scalp for Custer" found in promotional material for Buffalo Bill's Wild West

On 25 June 1876, as part of the Great Sioux War, Lieutenant-Colonel George Armstrong Custer led the United States Army's 7th Cavalry Regiment against an allied force of Native American tribes, partly under the command of Hunkpapa Lakota chief and medicine man Sitting Bull. The native coalition won the battle, killing Custer and all the troops under his immediate command. The Battle of the Little Bighorn, as it became known, garnered considerable public interest but had little effect on the outcome of the war. The U.S. Army responded by sending more soldiers to the region, and the native coalition was eventually defeated. In the spring of 1877, Sitting Bull and his group exiled themselves to Canada.

During the Great Sioux War, the showman, soldier and hunter William F. Cody, better known as Buffalo Bill, was chief of scouts of the 5th Cavalry Regiment. Although he did not participate in the Battle of the Little Bighorn, he was a past acquaintance of Custer. (Note: In 1871, Cody and Custer participated in a buffalo hunt organized for the visit of Grand Duke Alexei Alexandrovich of Russia.) A month after the battle, during a skirmish at Warbonnet Creek, he killed and scalped a Cheyenne warrior, Yellow Hair, and allegedly (Note: Whether Cody actually said this is disputed. No other soldier present at the skirmish remembered him doing so.) proclaimed the event as "the first scalp for Custer", in honor of the commander. Cody's dramatization of the incident furthered his career as a showman, eventually becoming part of Buffalo Bill's Wild West, the show which he created in 1883.

=== Buffalo Bill's Wild West ===
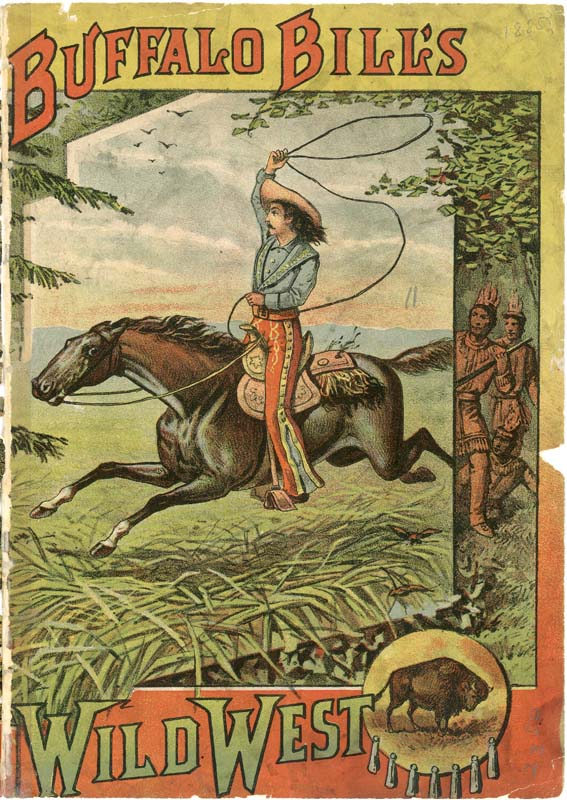
Program cover for the 1885 season

In 1881, after a four-year exile in Canada which was marked by insufficient food and resources, Sitting Bull returned to the border and surrendered to United States officials. He was a federal prisoner of war at Fort Randall until his release in 1883, after which he was made to live at the Standing Rock Agency as a ward of the American government. In 1885, Cody expressed interest in recruiting him to the Wild West. The show, made up of dramatized reenactments of recent episodes in American frontier history, enrolled Native Americans as performers. Although Sitting Bull was open to the idea, which would allow him to leave the reservation, Secretary of the Interior Lucius Q. C. Lamar was initially firmly opposed. After relentless pressure from Cody and his manager, John Burke, Lamar eventually relented and agreed for Sitting Bull to appear in the show's parade and in the arena, although not as a performer in the reenactments.

On 6 June, Sitting Bull signed a four-month contract with the Wild West, which paid him $50 (equivalent to $1,792 in 2025) per week with a bonus of $125 (equivalent to $4,479 in 2025). He also insisted on a clause giving him the exclusive right to sell souvenir photographs of himself and to charge a sitting fee to those who would wish to pose with him. On 12 June 1885, he joined the show in Buffalo, New York, one of 40 American and Canadian cities in the itinerary. He quickly became one of its central attractions, contributing to the financial success (Note: The 1885 season generated more than $100,000 (equivalent to $3,583,333 in 2025) in profit, allowing Buffalo Bill to pay off his debts from previous seasons. The following year was the one when he started working exclusively on the show.) of the 1885 season. His performance consisted in riding into the arena, alone on his mustang, and being taunted as the murderer of George Armstrong Custer. While he was generally booed in the United States, he was cheered on in Canada, where the show toured in the summer. (Note: The visited cities were Ottawa, Kingston, Hamilton, Toronto and Montreal.) In Montreal, where the Wild West arrived on 10 August and settled for a week (in the neighbourhood of Pointe-Saint-Charles), Sitting Bull was treated as an important visitor; he was presented to local Iroquois chiefs and invited to a steamboat ride on the St. Lawrence River.

== Session ==
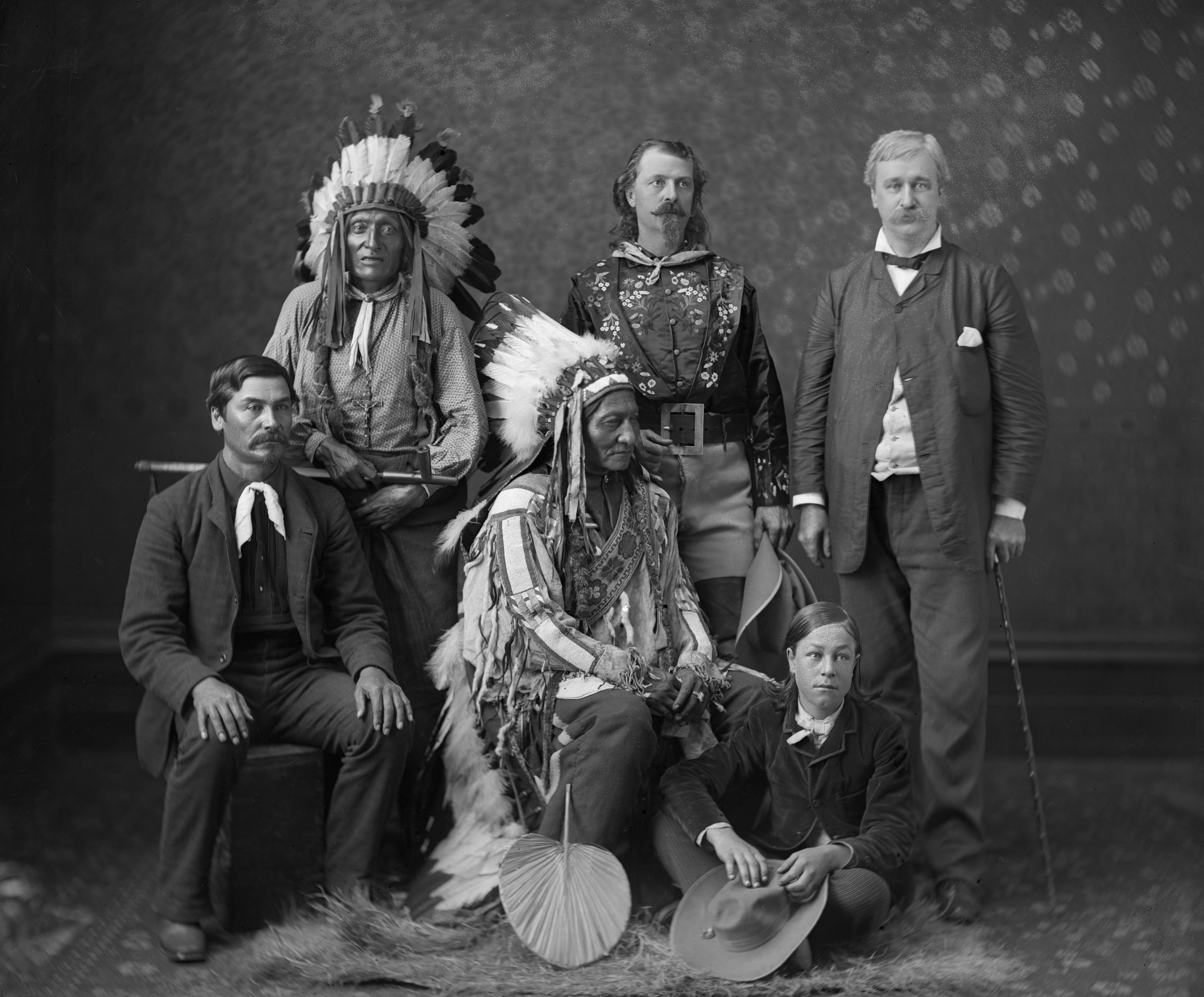
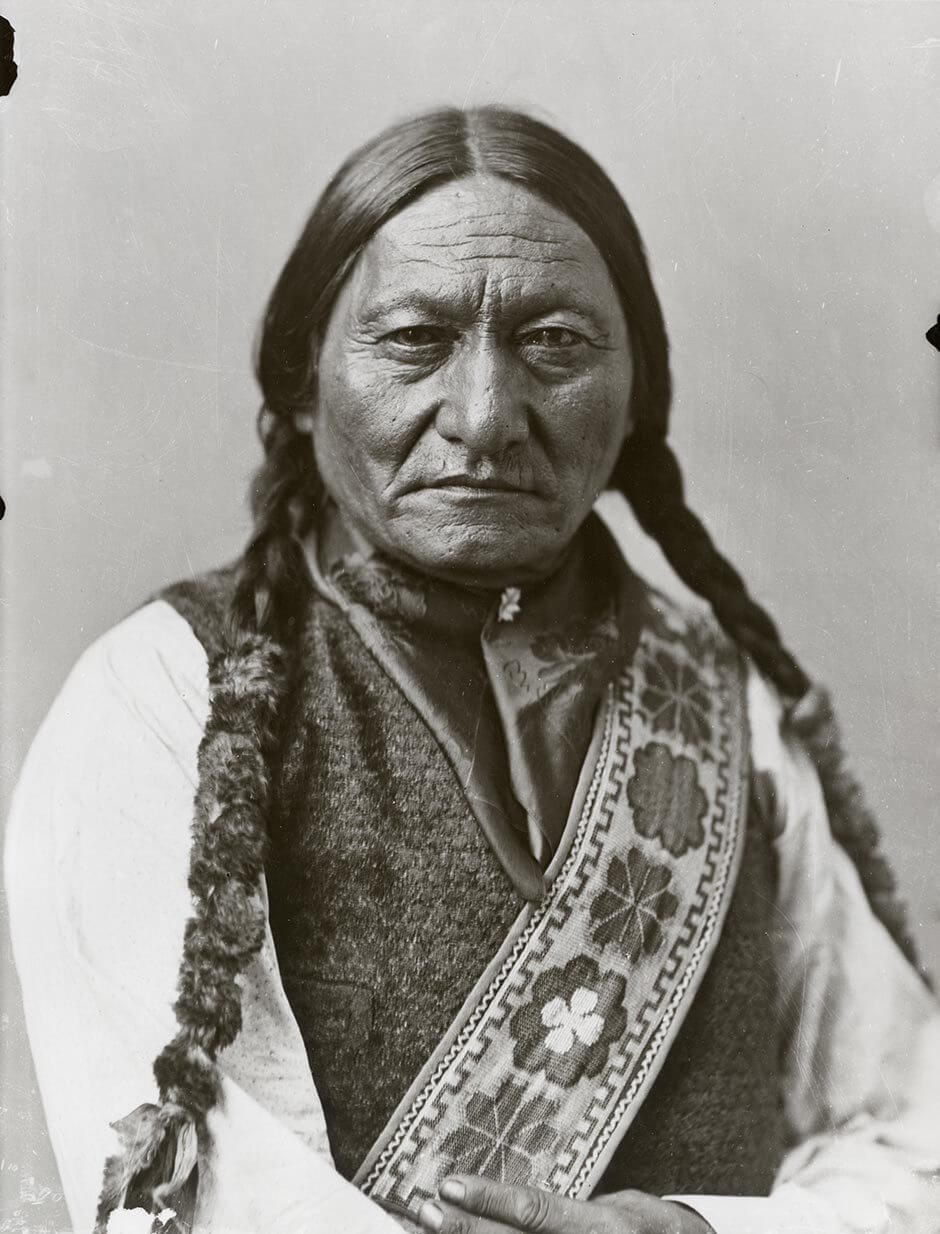
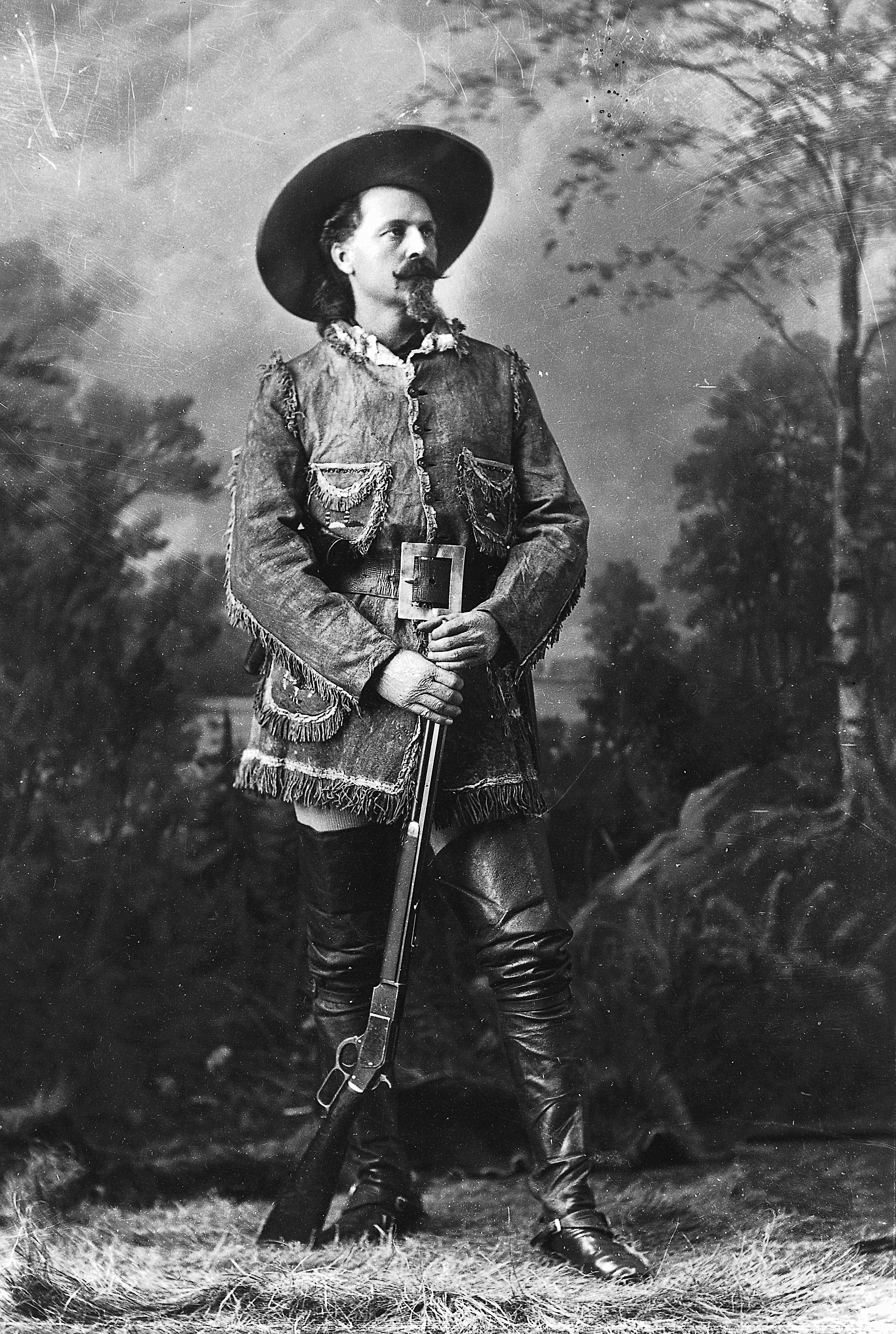
Other portraits taken during the same session: of the Wild West troupe (Note: From left to right: the interpreter William Halsey, Crow Eagle, Sitting Bull, Buffalo Bill, the young sharpshooter Johnny Baker and William H. H. "Adirondack" Murray.) (left), of Sitting Bull (center) and of Buffalo Bill (right)

While in Montreal, the Wild West commissioned a series of new souvenir photographs from the studio William Notman & Son, possibly due to their previous stock having been exhausted. The commission included 45 cabinet size albumen print photographs and two larger ones. The head of the studio, William Notman, was known internationally for his celebrity portraits. According to the art historian Jana L. Bara, Notman likely photographed Sitting Bull and Cody himself: "He was known to give important sitters his personal attention, as it was in his interest to ensure the proper treatment of stars of such calibre and to add them to his ever-growing list of celebrities." The photographs were taken using the gelatin dry plate process. The subjects were placed in front of one of the studio's painted backdrops, which Notman had used in previous sessions. It represented northeast woodland, a setting representative of central Canada; Notman & Son did not own any frontier-themed backdrop. Of the 47 commissioned portraits, eight were of Sitting Bull and Cody together. The remaining portraits were divided up as follows: 22 of Sitting Bull alone, eight of Cody alone, seven of Crow Eagle (another Native American performer in the troupe) and two group portraits. At least one of the group portraits features, in addition to troupe members, the American naturalist William H. H. "Adirondack" Murray, who then operated a restaurant in Montreal. Of the Notman photographs, 21 are currently unaccounted for, including two dual portraits of Sitting Bull and Cody.

== Distribution ==
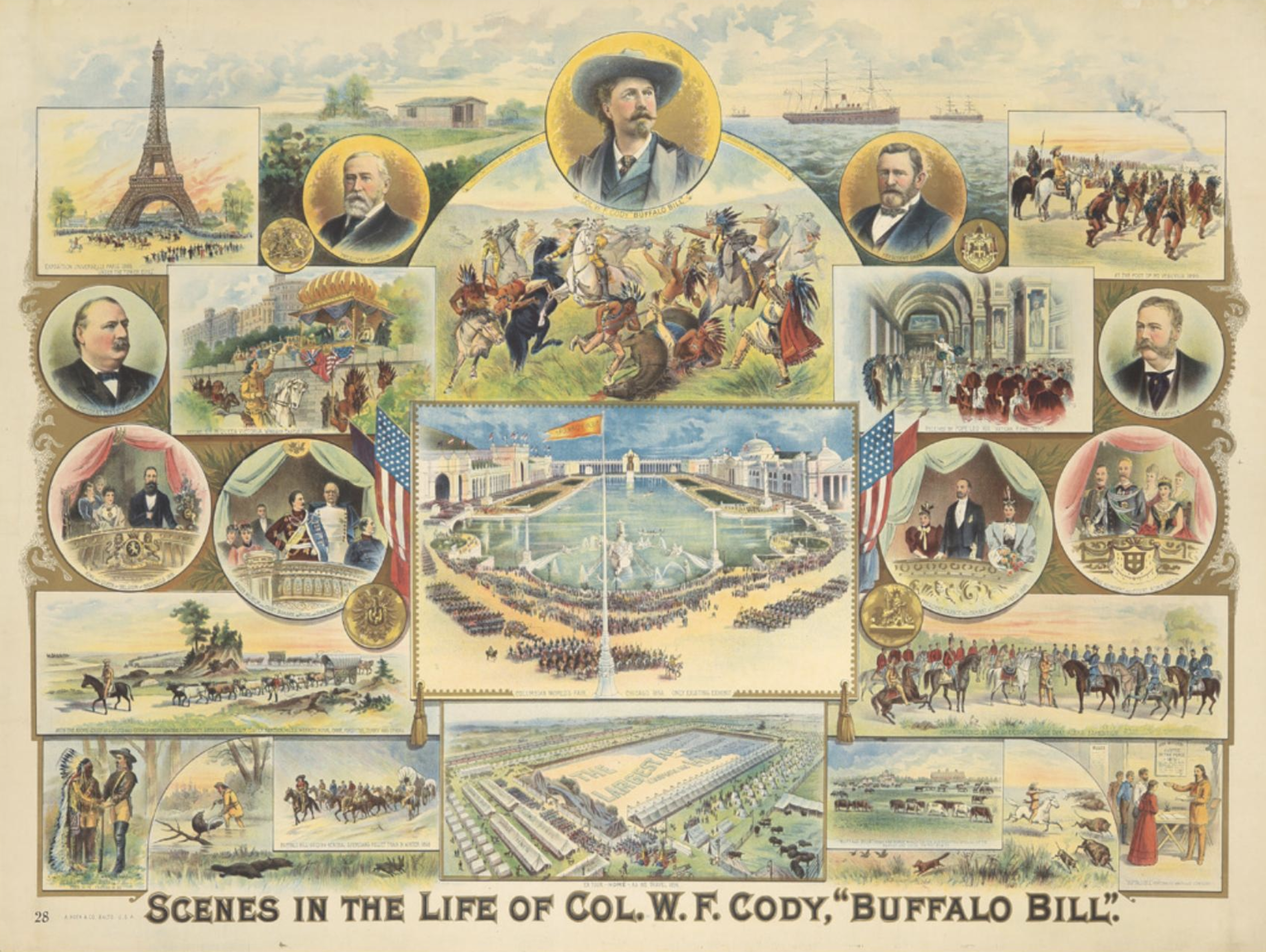
Pastiche poster from 1895, with a drawn reproduction of one of Notman's portraits in the lower left corner

Notman's photographs were turned into cabinet cards and widely sold, distributed and copied. The most widely reproduced photograph of the series was a dual portrait of Sitting Bull and Cody, showing the latter pointing to an imagined horizon. Even after the 1885 season, the only one in which Sitting Bull participated, (Note: James McLaughlin, the Indian agent in charge of the Standing Rock Agency, never allowed Sitting Bull to tour with the Wild West again.) it continued to be reproduced in promotional material. While its title on cabinet cards read Sitting Bull and Buffalo Bill, it was frequently published with the caption "Enemies in '76, Friends in '85", in reference to its subjects' opposing allegiances during the Great Sioux War. For the 1893 show program, the caption was slightly altered to "Foes in '76, Friends in '85". In June 1897, the photograph was copyrighted by the American photographer David Francis Barry, who is known for his portraits of Native Americans.

== Description ==
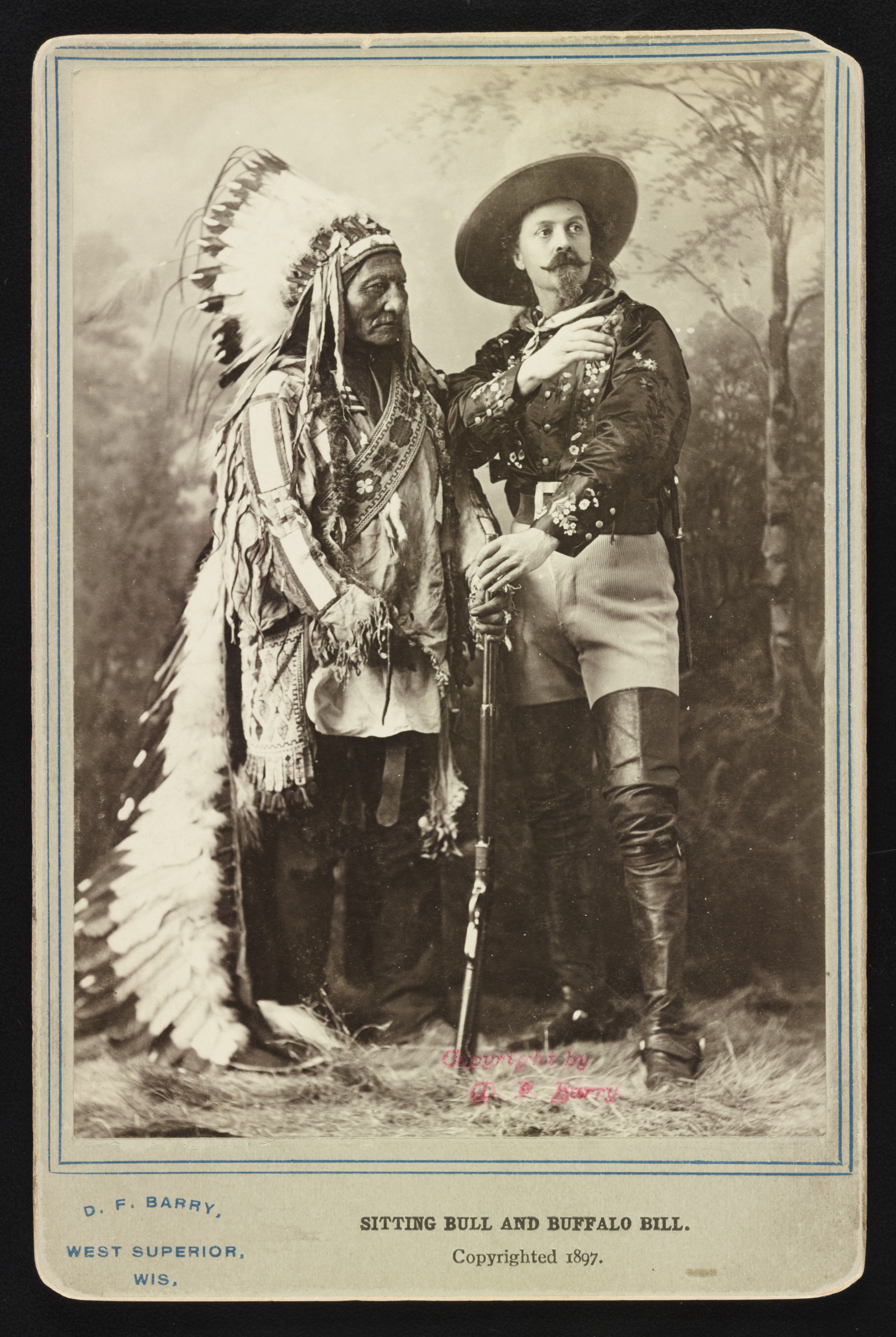
Print on a cabinet card

The dual portraits of Sitting Bull and Cody are set up in front of a painted backdrop representing northeast woodland, populated by birch trees. The subjects stand on a grasslike rug; Sitting Bull on the left, Cody on the right. In the "Enemies in '76, Friends in '85" photograph, they jointly hold a Winchester rifle (Model 1873) by the barrel, which is pointed upward. Cody's other hand hovers at his chest, pointing to an imagined horizon on the right side of the frame. His left foot steps out and his face is upturned and bathed in light. His expression, according to Jana L. Bara, conveys "visionary optimism". Sitting Bull's face is impassive. He is in three-quarters profile, turned slightly toward Cody. His eyes, which are in shadow, gaze in the general direction of Cody's finger. His right hand is hidden in the fringes of his jacket. Contrary to Cody, he appears motionless. In another pose, they shake hands.

Sitting Bull and Buffalo Bill are dressed archetypically: one as a "Plains Indian", the other as a frontiersman. These outfits are their show clothes. (Note: Wild West shows played an important role in establishing the figure of the "Plains chief", like Sitting Bull in Buffalo Bill's Wild West, as the archetypal "Indian" in popular culture. Sitting Bull's ordinary dress, according to interviews from the time period, was more hybrid and Europeanized.) Sitting Bull's head is adorned with a floor-length eagle-feather headdress, and he wears a fringed leather shirt and loose, dark trousers. The shirt was not his own and had likely been made by a member of the Crow tribe. Sitting Bull's braids are draped in otter fur hair wraps. His outfit also includes a beaded bandolier bag and an embroidered sash across his chest. Cody wears a satin shirt embroidered with flowers, riding pants, thigh-high boots and a Stetson hat. His wide leather belt holds a knife. Both he and Sitting Bull wear different sets of clothing in other portraits.

=== Analysis ===
The Innu cultural figure André Dudemaine described "Enemies in '76, Friends in '85" as an intentionally theatrical image in which "one plays along, the other does not". He referred to Buffalo Bill, who "gladly strikes a pose, exaggerating it just a tad", in contrast to Sitting Bull's "motionless stance" and his eyes, which "find a way to signal that they are not looking where they are being told to". Dudemaine interpreted Buffalo Bill as "substituting Custer", with his similar moustache and goatee, and wrote that Sitting Bull portrays himself as "a proud fighter capable of valiantly resisting the assaults of the conqueror". He argued that "the conqueror", like the photographer, was being taunted by Sitting Bull's "untameable interiority". On the other hand, the American studies scholar Joy Kasson wrote that the "balance of power seems to tip toward Cody", who "seems active and masterful, pointing the way to the acquiescent warrior". Jana L. Bara saw "a semblance of cooperation and joint purpose" in the photograph.

== Legacy ==
Sitting Bull and Buffalo Bill helped popularize the archetype of the "Cowboys and Indians", which, according to Jana L. Bara, "was instrumental in the fabrication of the popular idea of the Wild West. This cliché, reinforced through the perceived veracity and realism of photography, became one of the representative images of North American iconology throughout the world." The anthropologist Linda Scarangella McNenly viewed the series as one of the "earliest representations of the foe-to-friend discourse in relation to Wild West shows", a discourse which, she wrote, "signaled to the public the successful civilizing of Native peoples, as well as their changing relationship with the white settler community". On the same subject, Joy Kasson wrote that "the 'friendship' offered in this photograph —and in Wild West performances— honored American Indian dignity only at the expense of surrender to white dominance and control."

André Dudemaine wrote of the "Enemies in '76, Friends in '85" portrait that it was a "mythical photograph" and "an icon of American popular culture". The author Deanne Stillman wrote that it was "a hallmark of the Wild West", while the historian Jean-François Nadeau said that it was "the most famous photograph of the Western legend". Notman's portraits of Sitting Bull are among the last to have been taken of him before he was killed in 1890 by Indian tribal police at the Standing Rock Indian Reservation. After his death, a painting made by his secretary and friend Caroline Weldon, based on one of the Notman photographs, was found in his cabin. It had been damaged in the struggle and was allegedly among his prized possessions.

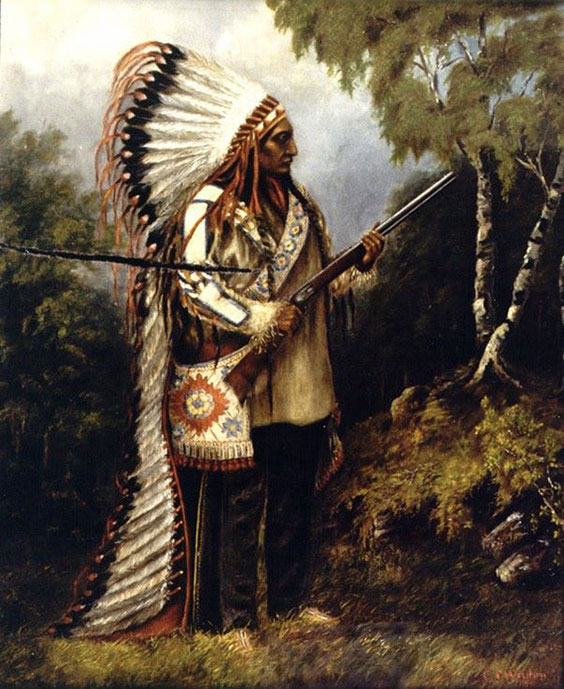
Painting by Caroline Weldon, based on one of the Notman photographs

== See also ==
- Buffalo Bill and the Indians, or Sitting Bull's History Lesson – 1976 film by Robert Altman which satirizes Buffalo Bill's relationship to Sitting Bull on Buffalo Bill's Wild West
