= William Notman =

Scottish-Canadian photographer and businessman (1826–1891)

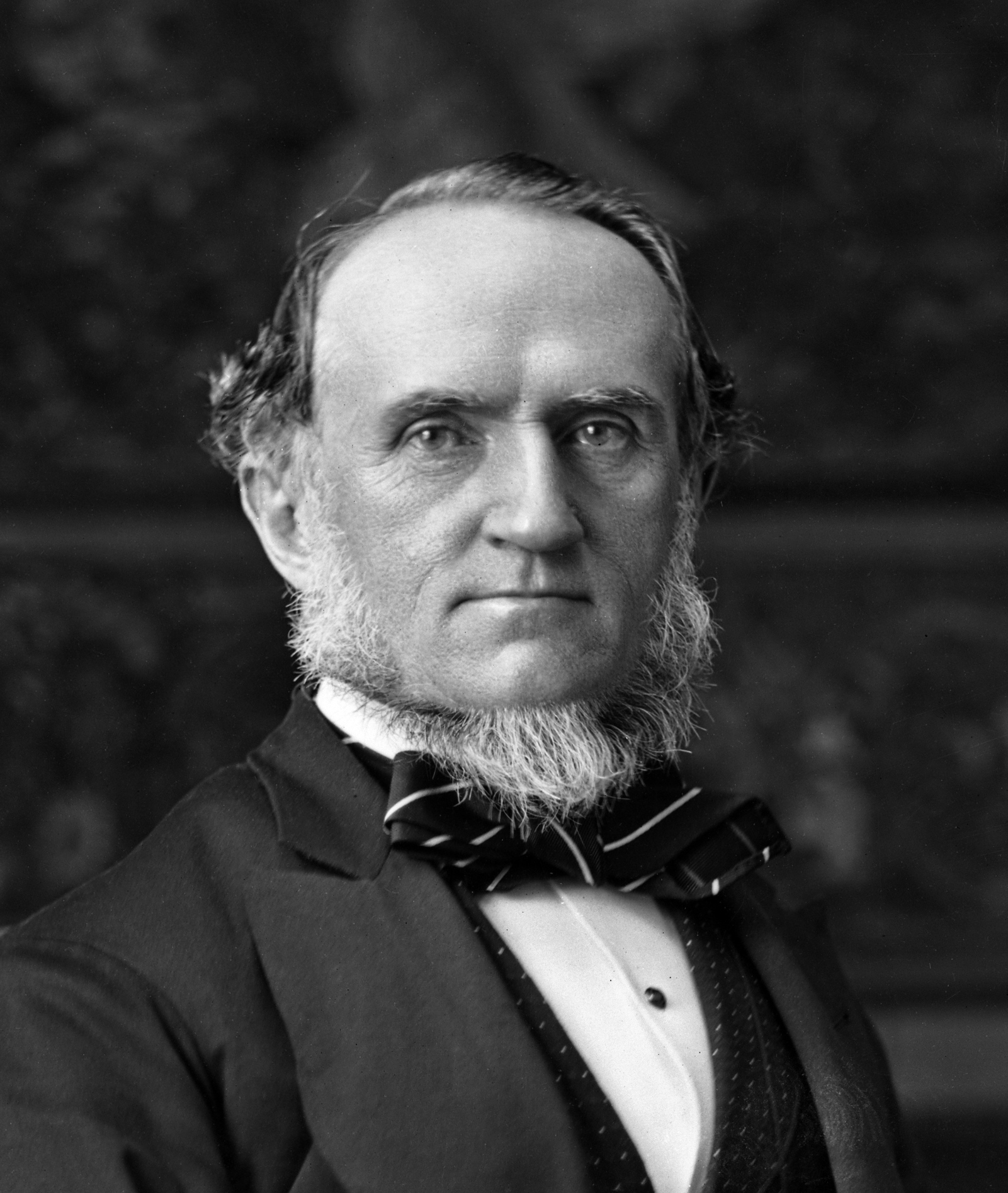
- Notman in his studio, 1876
- Born: 8 March 1826; Paisley, Scotland
- Died: 25 November 1891 (aged 65); Montreal, Quebec, Canada
- Occupations: Photographer, businessman

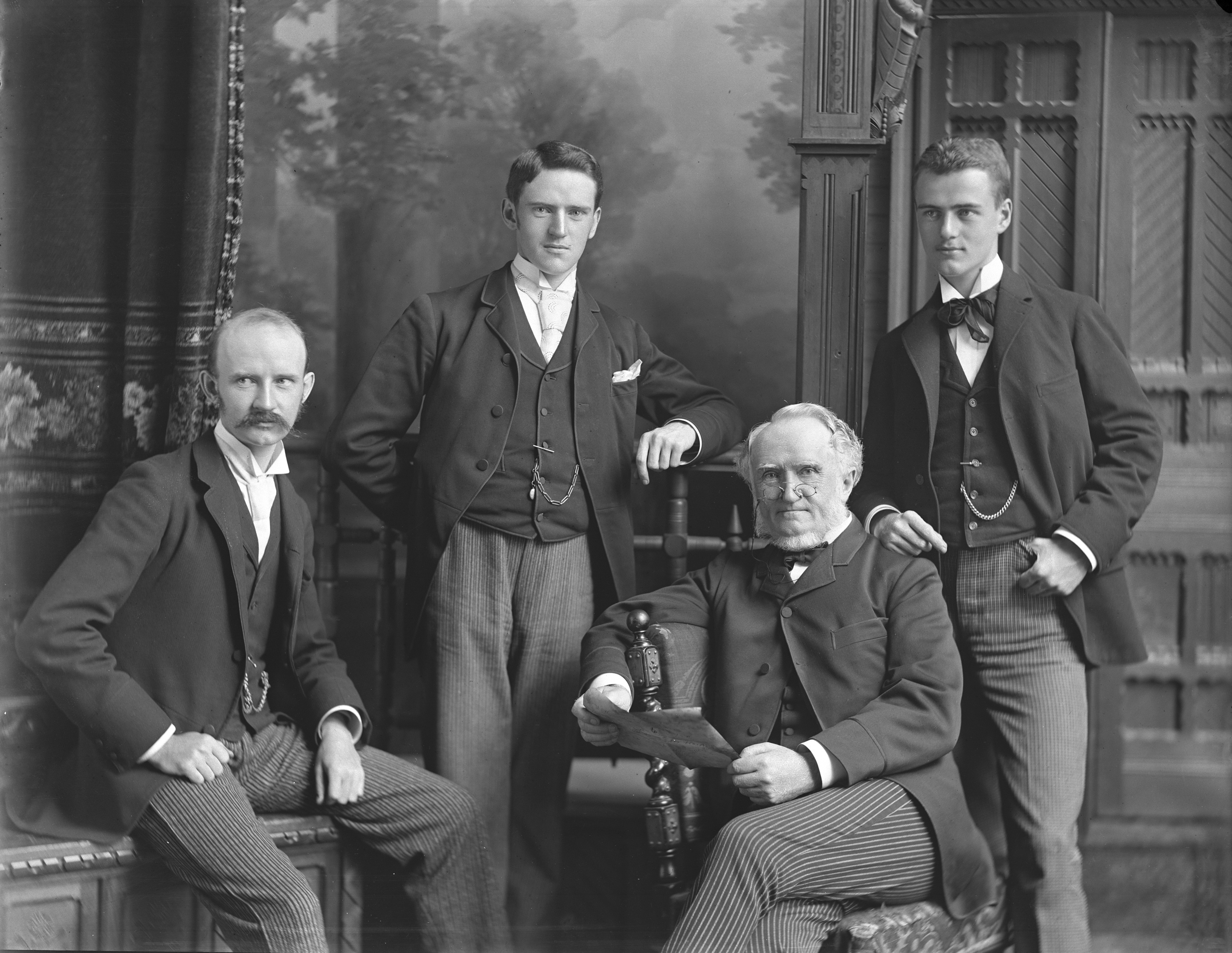
William Notman and his sons William Mcf., Charles, and George. Taken in his studio in 1890.

William Notman (8 March 1826 – 25 November 1891) was a Scottish-Canadian photographer and businessman. The Notman House in Montreal was his home from 1876 until his death in 1891, and it has since been named after him. Notman was the first photographer in Canada to achieve international recognition.

== Biography ==
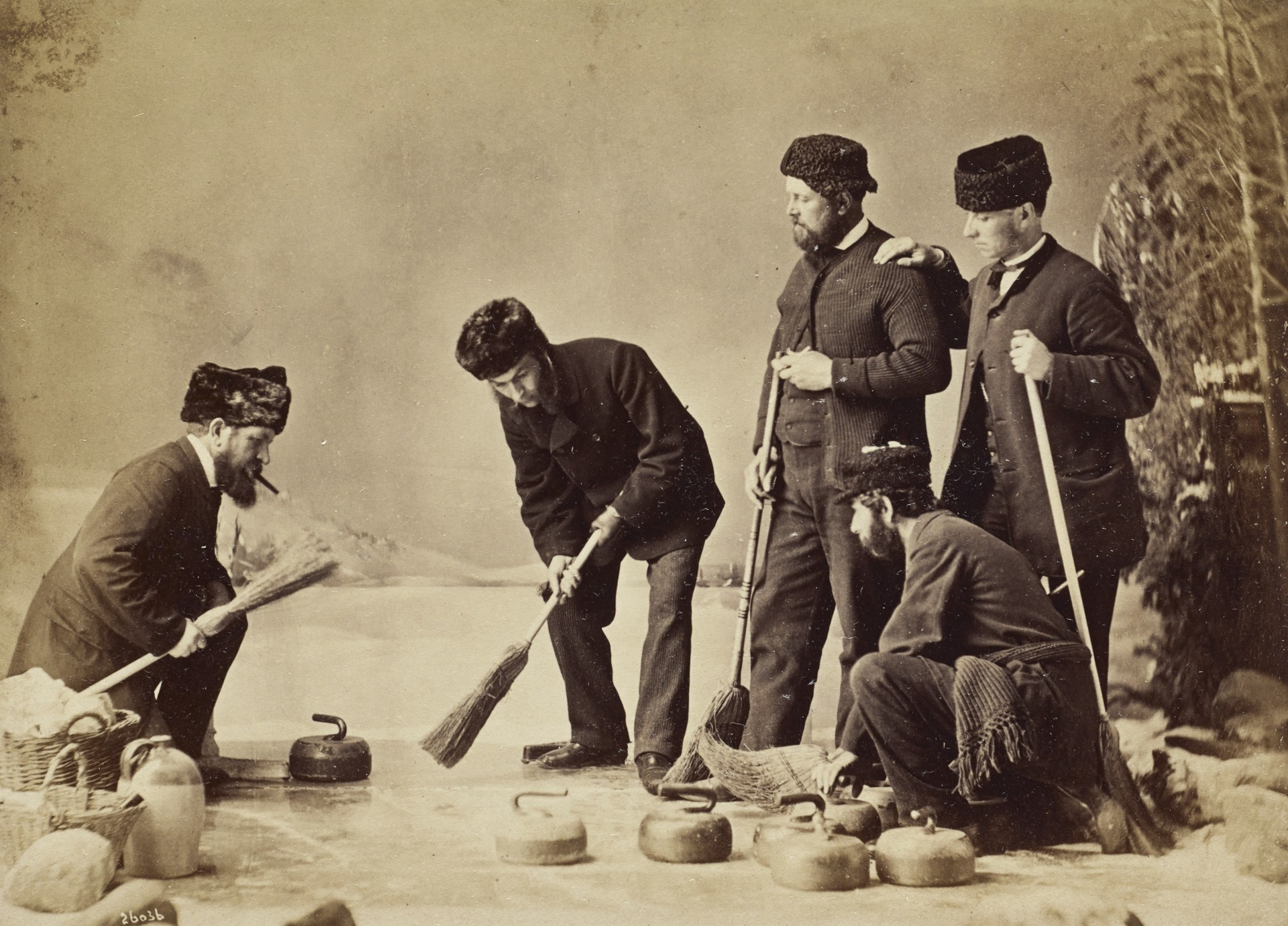
Five men curling (albumen print), The National Galleries of Scotland

Notman was born in Paisley, Scotland, in 1826. He received a decent education, which included lessons in painting and drawing. He moved to Montreal in the summer of 1856. An amateur photographer, he quickly established a flourishing professional photography studio on Bleury Street, a location close to Montreal's central commercial district, where he attracted clients who were members of the political and business elite.

His first important commission was the documentation of the construction of the Victoria Bridge across the St. Lawrence River. The bridge opened with great fanfare in 1860, attended by the Prince of Wales and Notman's camera. The gift to the prince of a maple box containing Notman's photographs of the construction of the bridge and scenes of Canada East and Canada West so pleased Queen Victoria that, according to family tradition, she named him "Photographer to the Queen."

Notman's status and business grew over the next three decades. He established branches throughout Canada and the United States, including seasonal branches at Yale and Harvard universities to cater to the student trade. Notman was also an active member of the Montreal artistic community; he collaborated with other artists such as Alexander Henderson to sponsor and host art exhibitions in his studio. The studio also provided training for aspiring photographers and painters.

Notman was highly regarded by his colleagues for his innovative photography, and held patents for some of the techniques he developed to recreate winter within the studio walls. He could simulate the presence of ice and snow in the studio, replicate fire using magnesium flares, and create naturalistic photographs using an innovative composite technique. His professional renown and financial success may largely be attributed to his winter scenes. He won medals at exhibitions in Montreal, London, Paris, and Australia. Notman's celebrity was also bolstered by his portraits of famous subjects such as one of Sitting Bull (Sioux name Tatanka Iyotake) and Buffalo Bill (born William Frederick Cody).

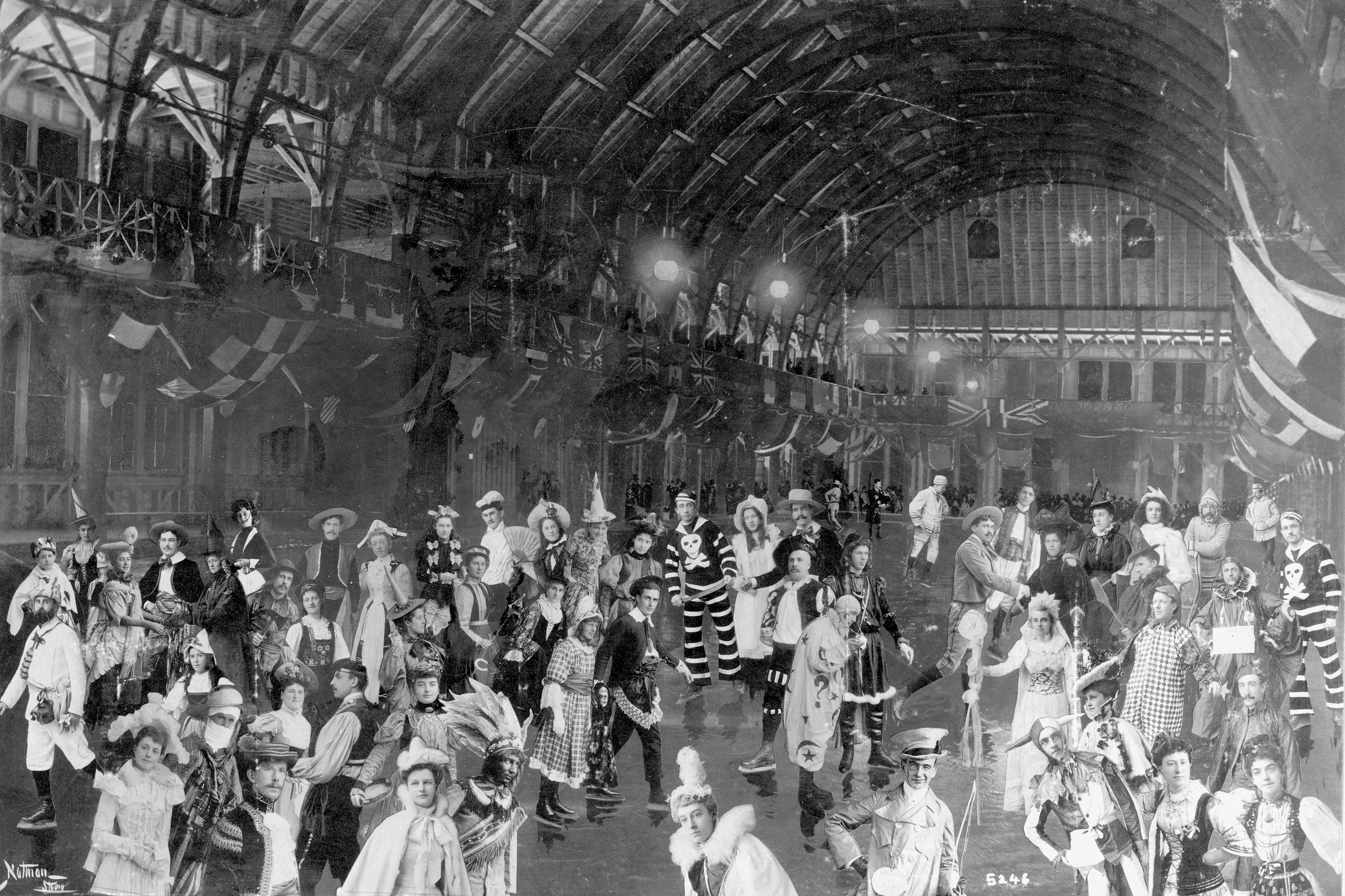
Composite Photograph of Carnival, South End Exhibition Rink, Halifax, Nova Scotia, Canada, February 1899. The carefully prepared composite photograph was a Notman specialty

Photography during the mid-19th century was not the simple process it later became. The typical tourist generally did not carry a camera and much of the Notman studio's images were taken with the tourist's needs in mind. Visitors would look through Notman's picture books and chose views, to buy individually mounted or perhaps made up into an album, and have a portrait taken as well. Street scenes in the burgeoning cities of Canada, the magnificence of modern transportation by rail and steam, expansive landscapes and the natural wonders, were all in demand either as 8" x 10" print, or in the popular stereographic form, and were duly recorded by the many staff photographers working for the Notman studio.

He was a regular contributor to the photographic journal Philadelphia Photographer and in partnership with its editor, Edward Wilson, formed the Centennial Photographic Company for the Centennial Exhibition in Philadelphia, held in honour of the 100th anniversary of the United States in 1876. He won the only gold medal to be awarded by the British judges and the portrait identification card required for entrance to the grounds was the ancestor of today's various photo-ID cards.

When William Notman died suddenly in November 1891 after a short bout of pneumonia, management of the studio Wm Notman & Son was left to his son William McFarlane Notman, an experienced photographer in his own right, who with his brothers, had accompanied the itinerant settlement known as "End of Track" for the Canadian Pacific Railway and documented the completion of the railway in Western Canada.

== Legacy ==
At Notman's death, his eldest son and partner, William McFarlane Notman, inherited the company. When William McFarlane Notman died of cancer in 1913, his younger brother Charles assumed responsibility. In 1935, Charles retired and sold the studio to the Associated Screen News, In 1957, the Notman Collection was purchased by McGill University. The 200,000 negatives, 43 Index Books, 200 Picture Books and assorted memorabilia were transferred to the McCord Museum of Canadian History.

The Notman Photographic Archives was created with the addition of the McCord Museum's existing photographic holdings to the Notman Collection, and the Notman Collection served as the kernel for an extensive Canadian photography department, covering Canada from Newfoundland to Victoria, the Great Lakes to the Arctic, from 1841 to 1935.

His residence from 1876 until his death, Notman House in Montreal was added to the Répertoire du patrimoine culturel du Québec historic registry on 8 December 1979.

== Gallery ==
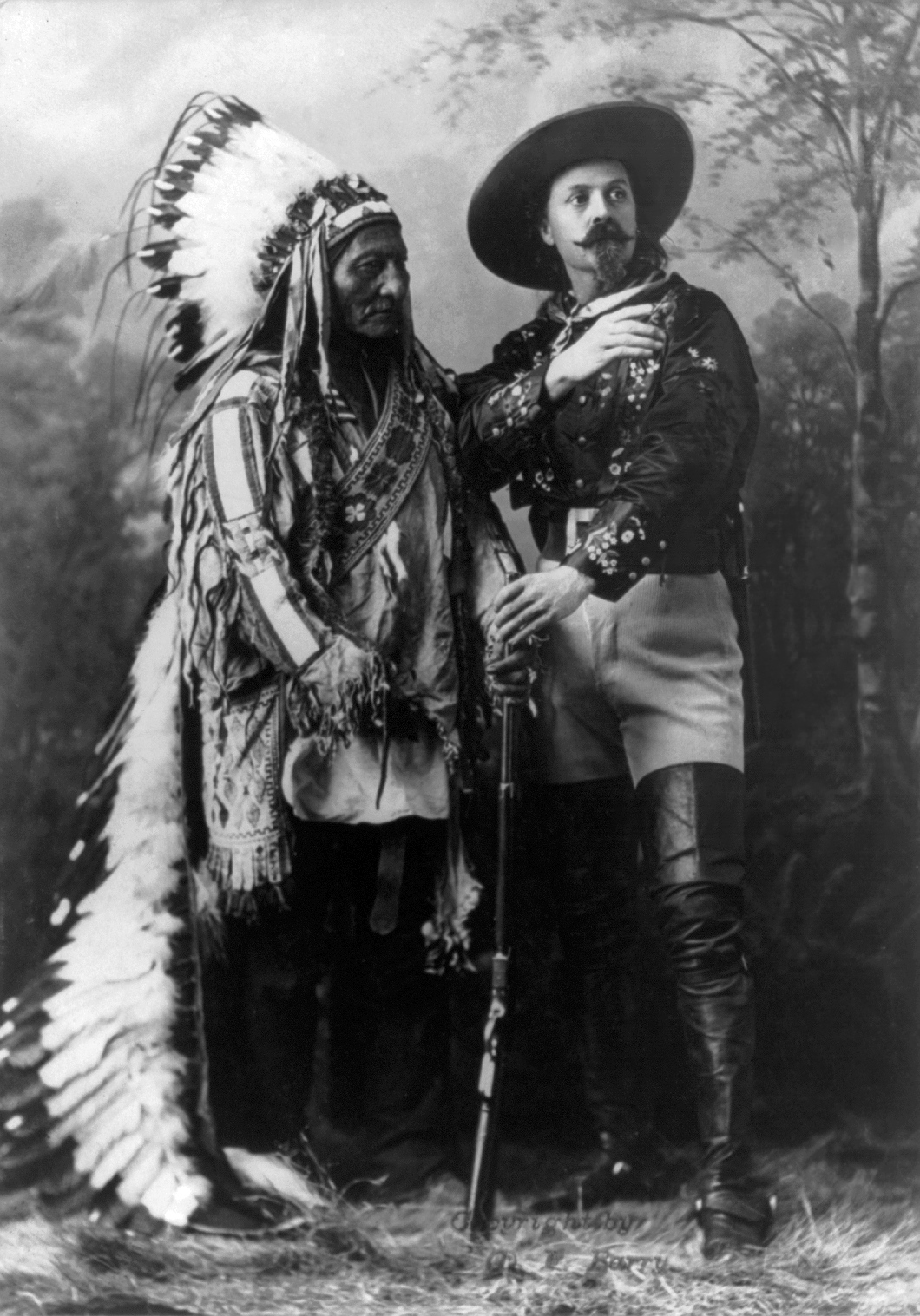
Sitting Bull and Buffalo Bill (1885), by Notman

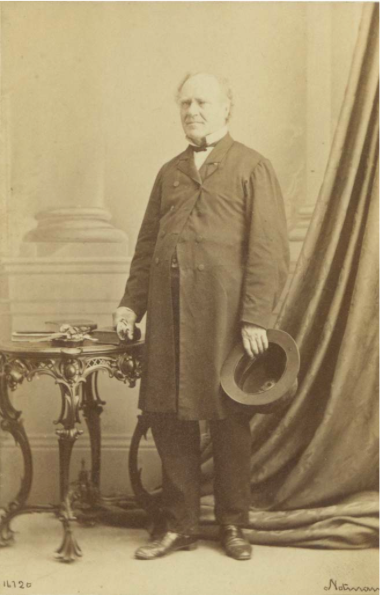
Canadian politician Joseph Howe by William Notman

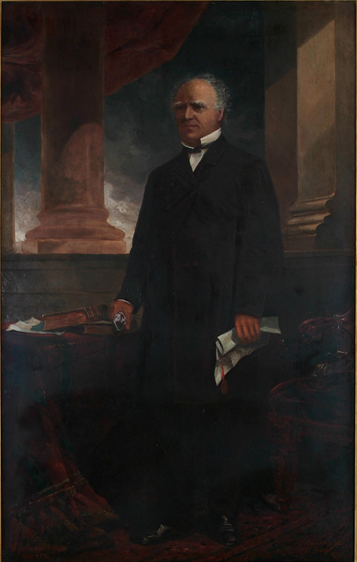
Joseph Howe by Henry Sandham, Province House (Nova Scotia), from photo by Notman

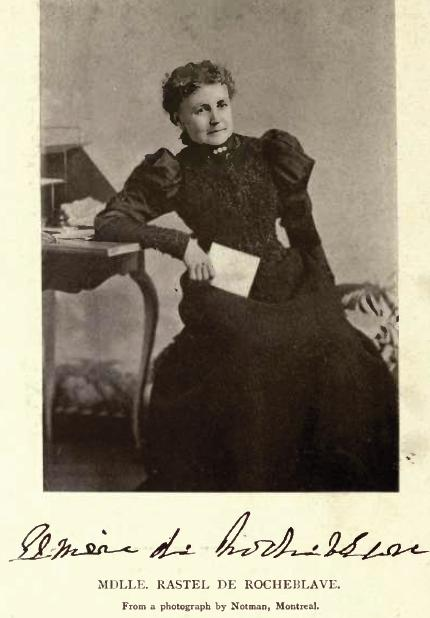
Elmira Rastel de Rocheblave by Notman

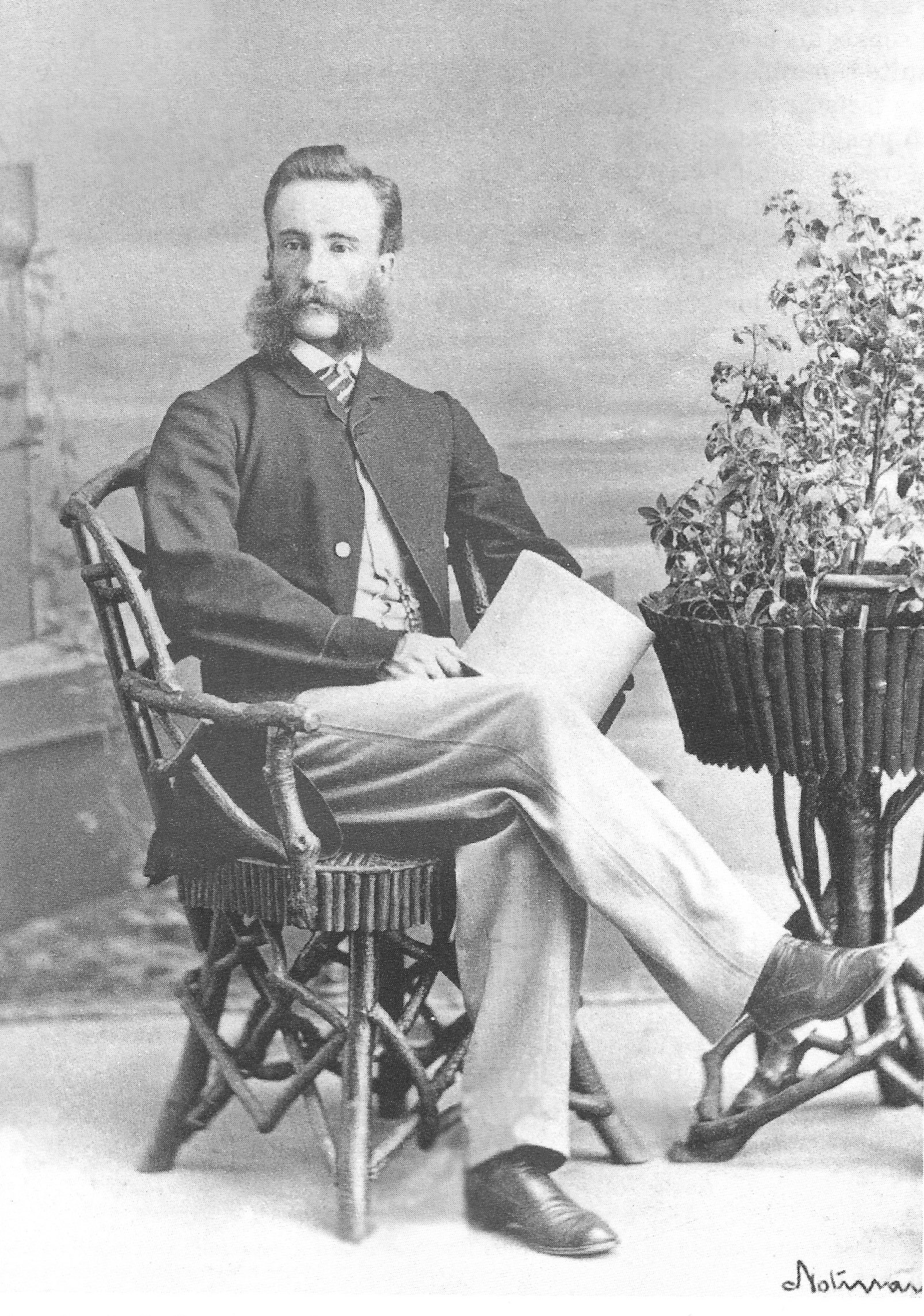
William Henry Jeffrey, 1865, by William Notman.

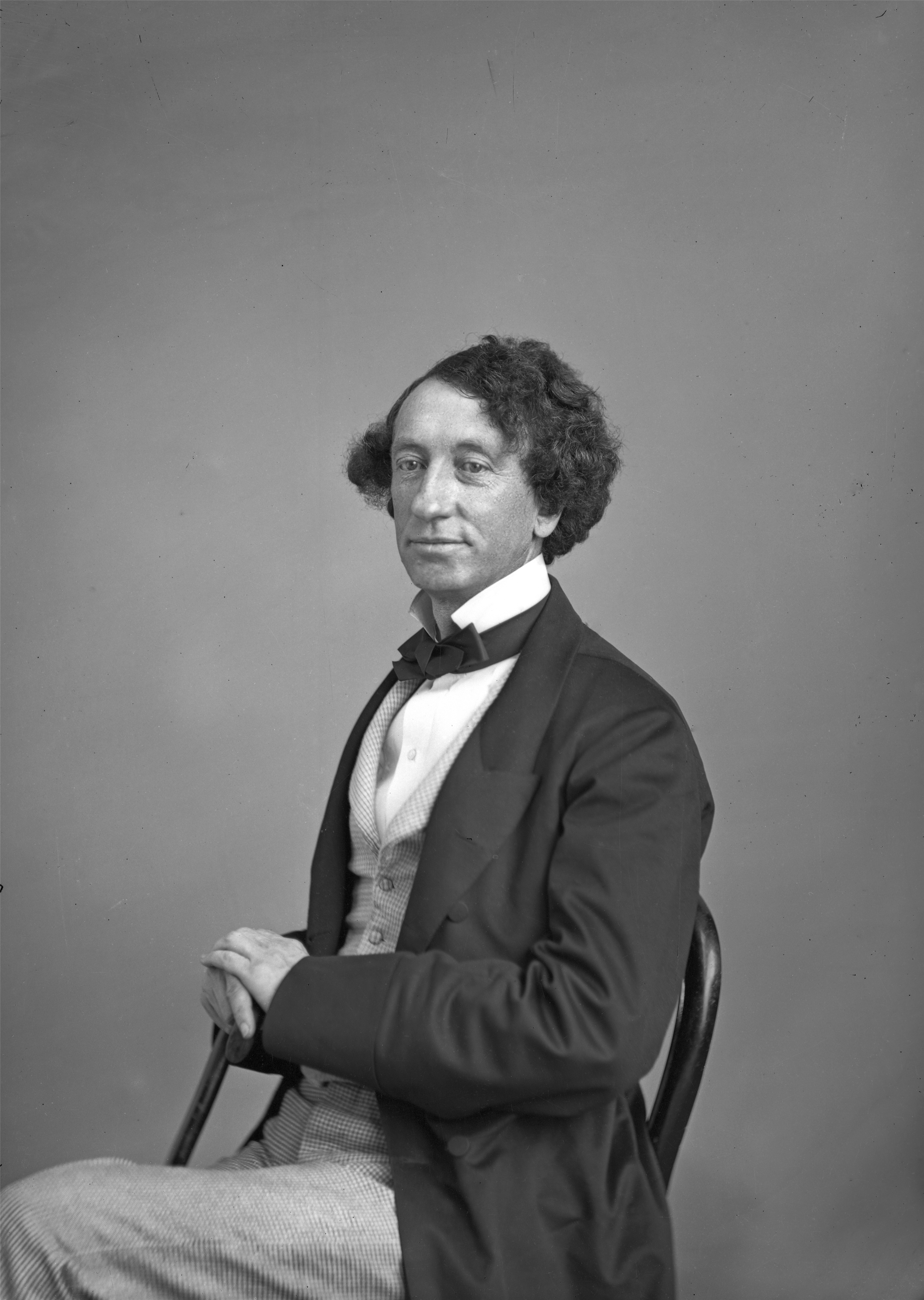
Sir John A. Macdonald, 1863, first prime minister of Canada.

Railway magnate John Ryan, 1865, by William Notman.

== See also ==
- McCord Stewart Museum
- John A. Macdonald
- John Ryan (railway magnate)
- Lower Canada
- Onondaga people
- Scots-Quebecers
- William James Topley
- William Henry Jeffrey
