= Painted photography backdrops =

Feature of early photography studios

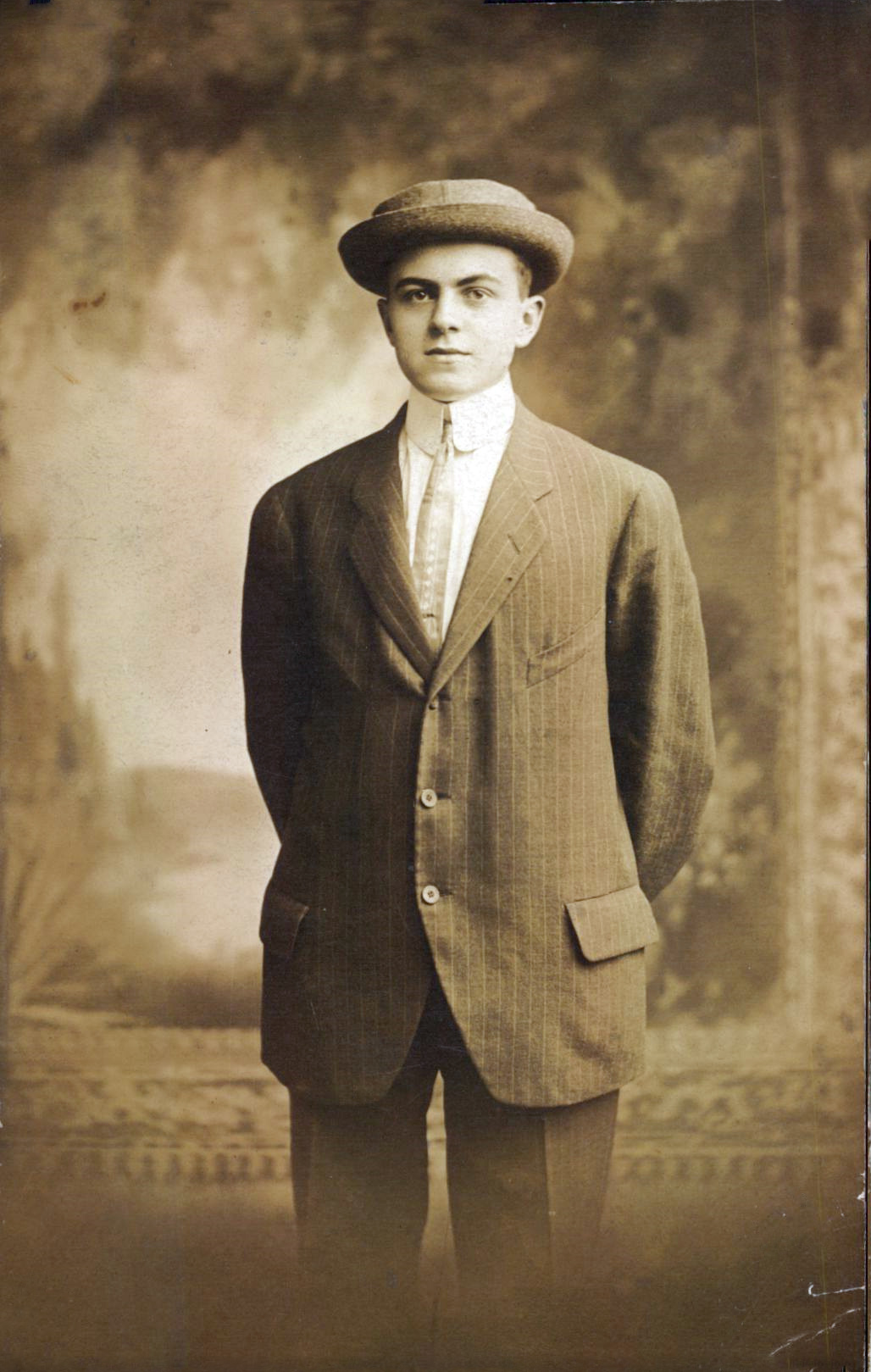
Newark, New Jersey, 1912

From roughly 1860 to 1920 painted photography backdrops was a standard feature of early photography studios. Generally of rustic or quasi-classical design, but sometimes presenting a bourgeoisie trompe-l'œil, they eventually fell out of fashion with the advent of the Brownie and Kodak cameras which brought photography to the masses with concurrent changes to public sensibility. Inasmuch as they were produced for six decades by local artisans, they can provide important clues to the provenance of old family photographs for genealogical research, and their staged influence lives on in "old-timey" photography sets. Furthermore, they are of some interest to specialized collectors of the history of photography.

== Gallery ==
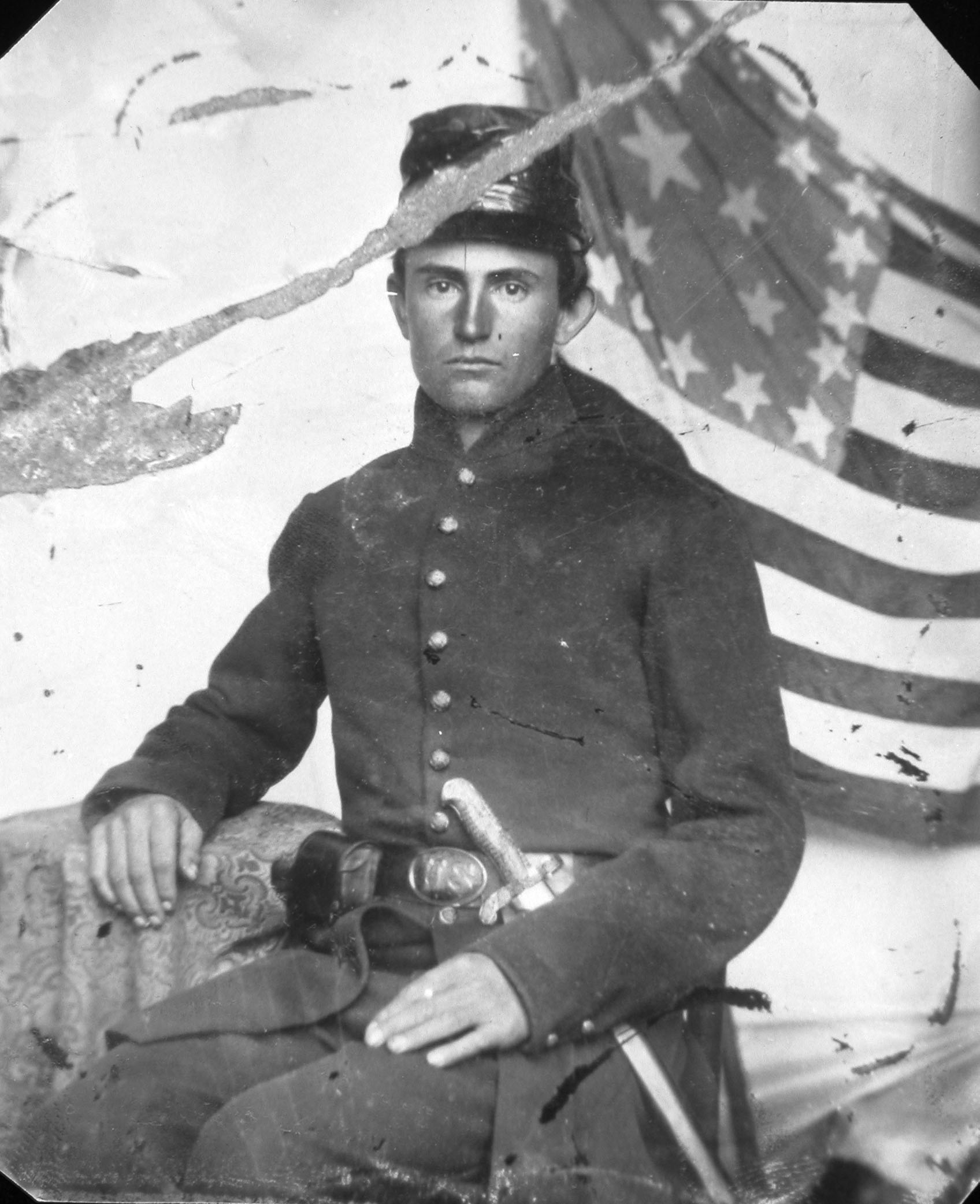
Illinois, 1862

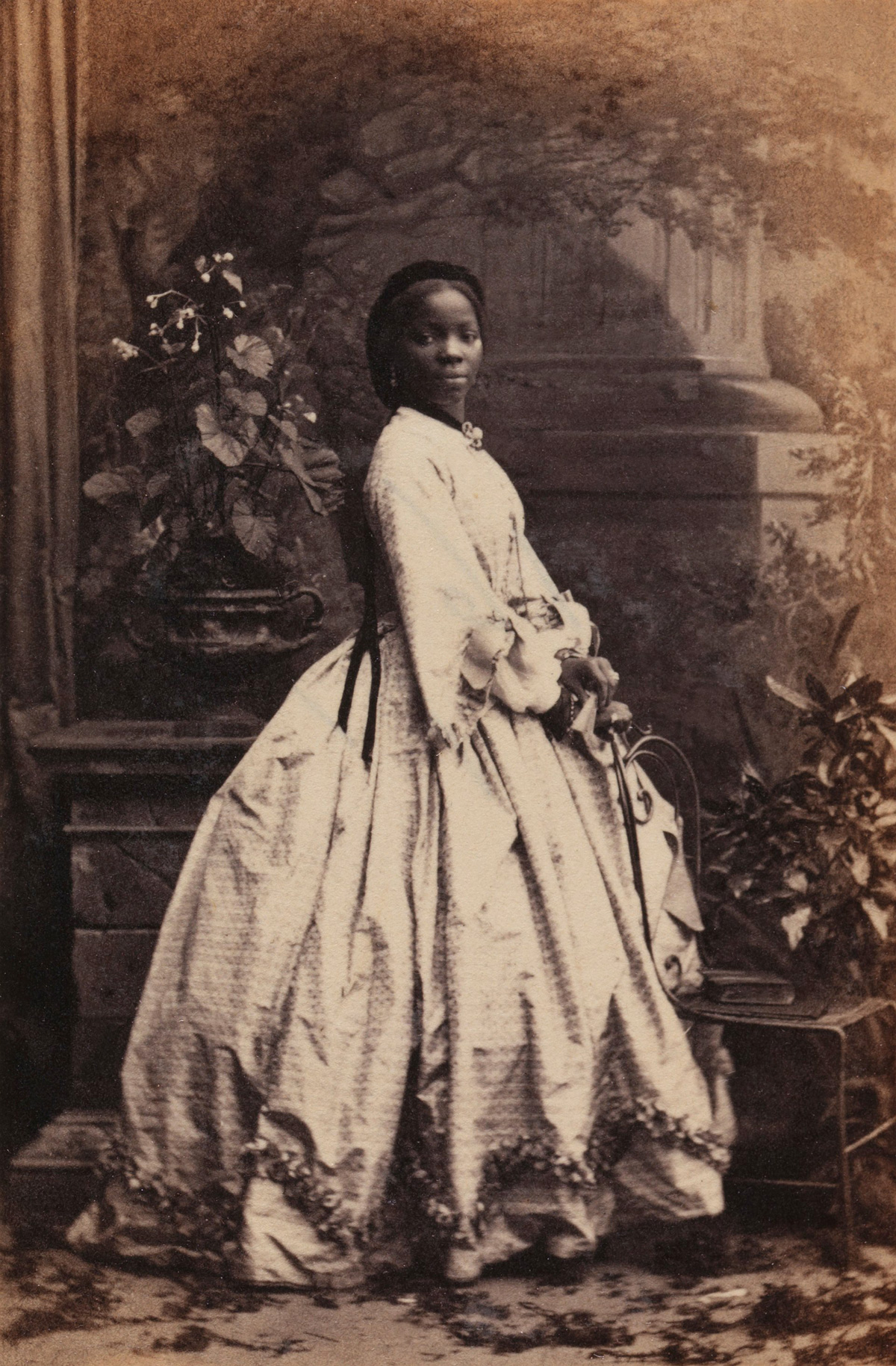
Sarah Forbes Bonetta photographed by Camille Silvy, Great Britain, 1862

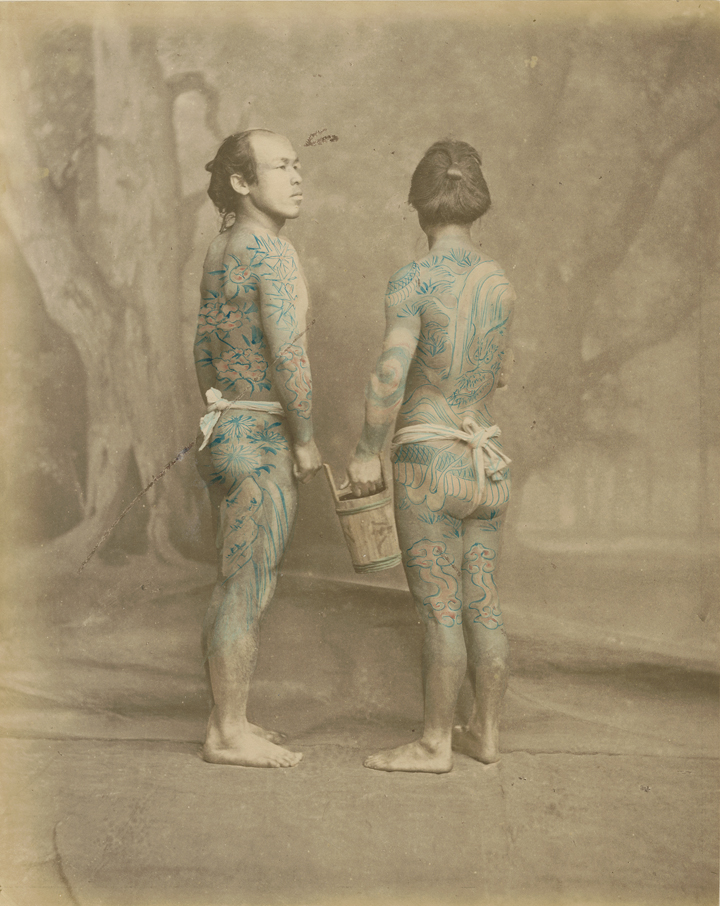
Japanese men in 1870 with irezumi wearing fundoshi

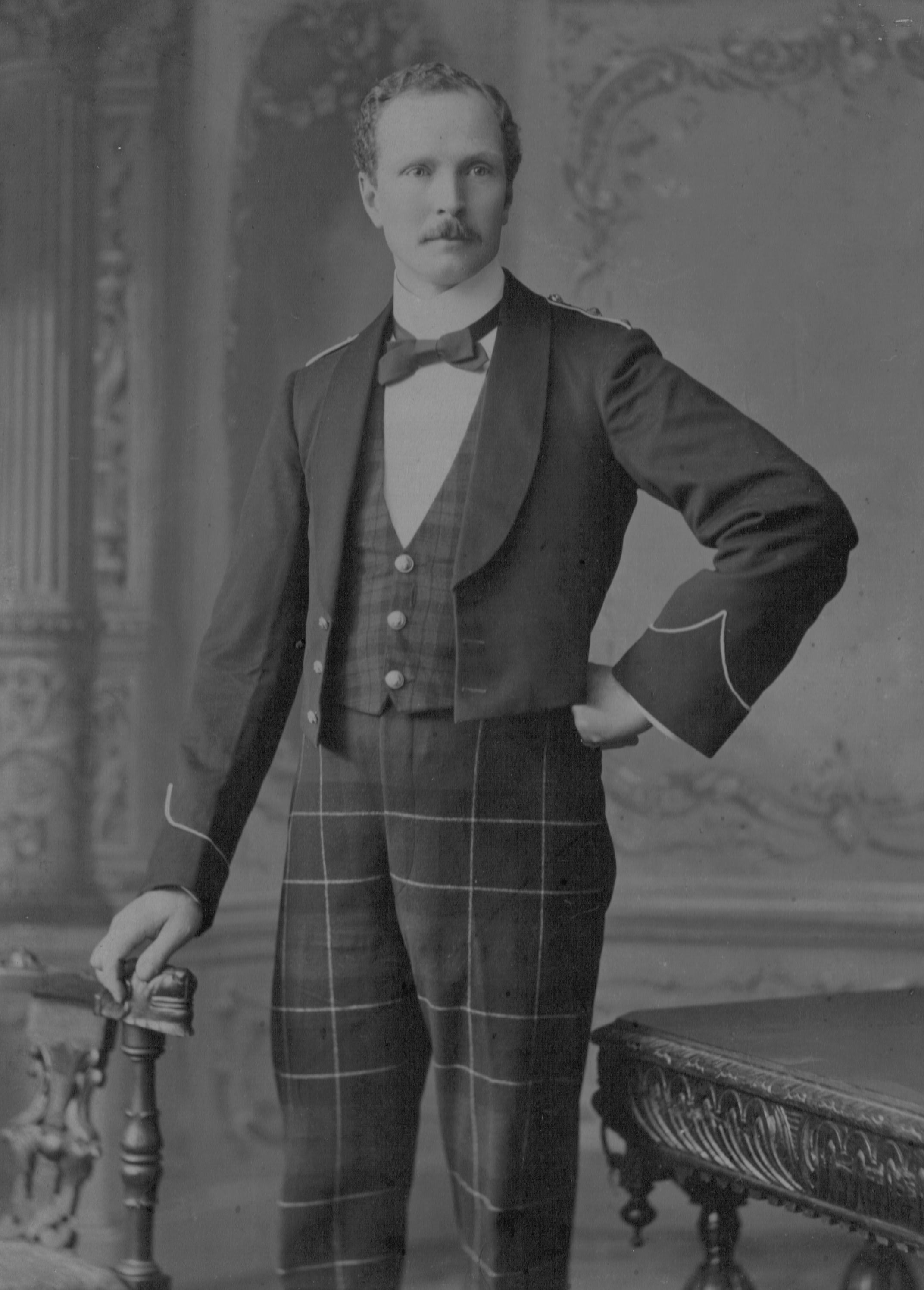
Scotland, 1875

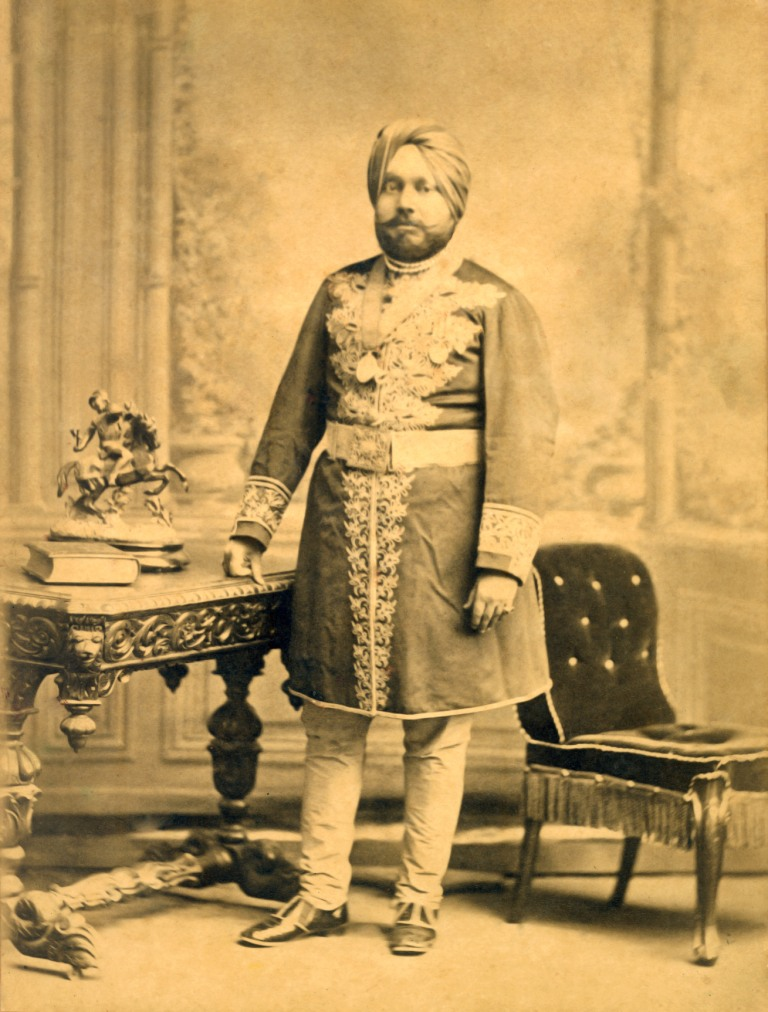
India, before 1877

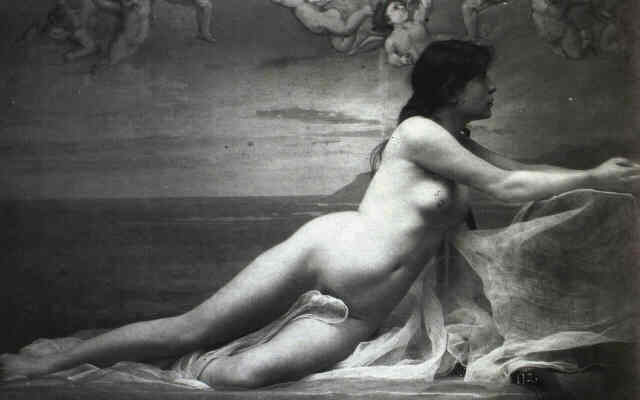
France, 1870–1879

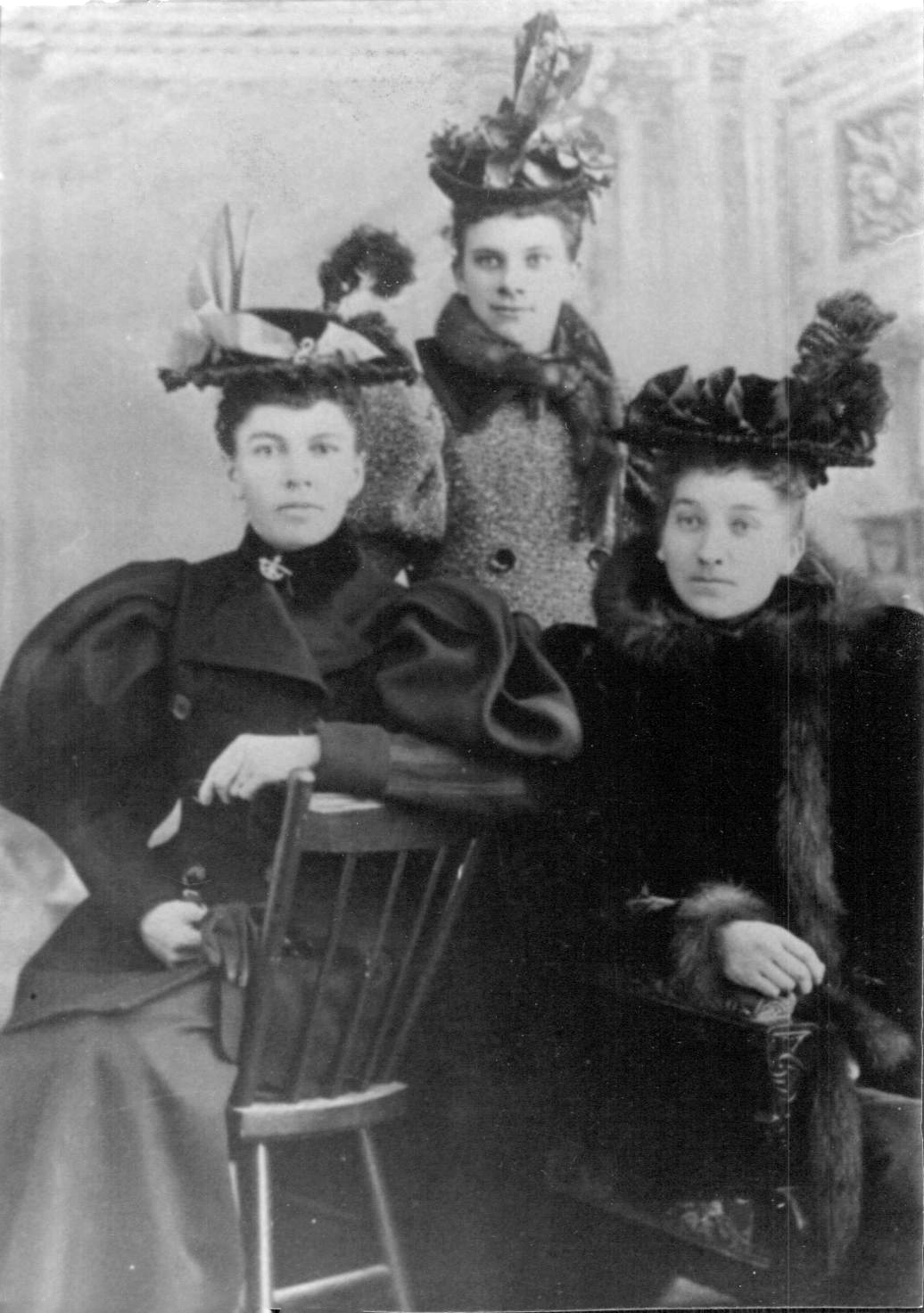
Berlin (now Kitchener), Ontario, Canada 1878

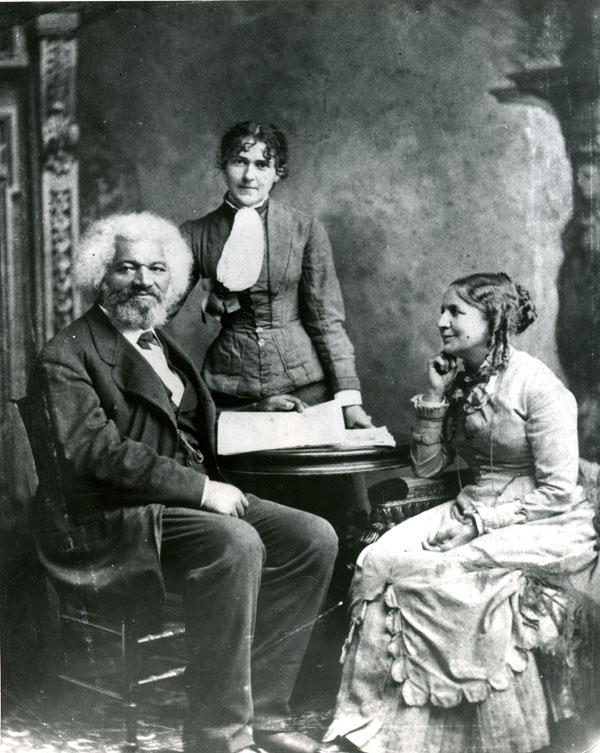
Frederick Douglass with his second wife Helen Pitts Douglass and her sister (standing), c. 1884

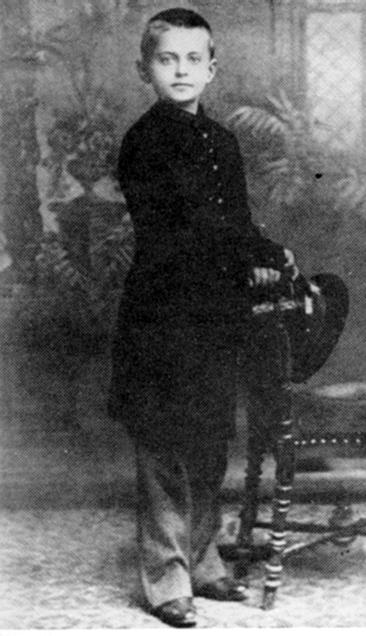
Leon Trotsky, 1888, Russia

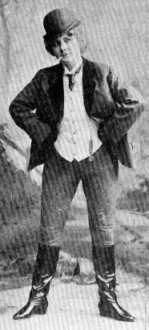
One of the Barrison sisters, Berlin, 1903

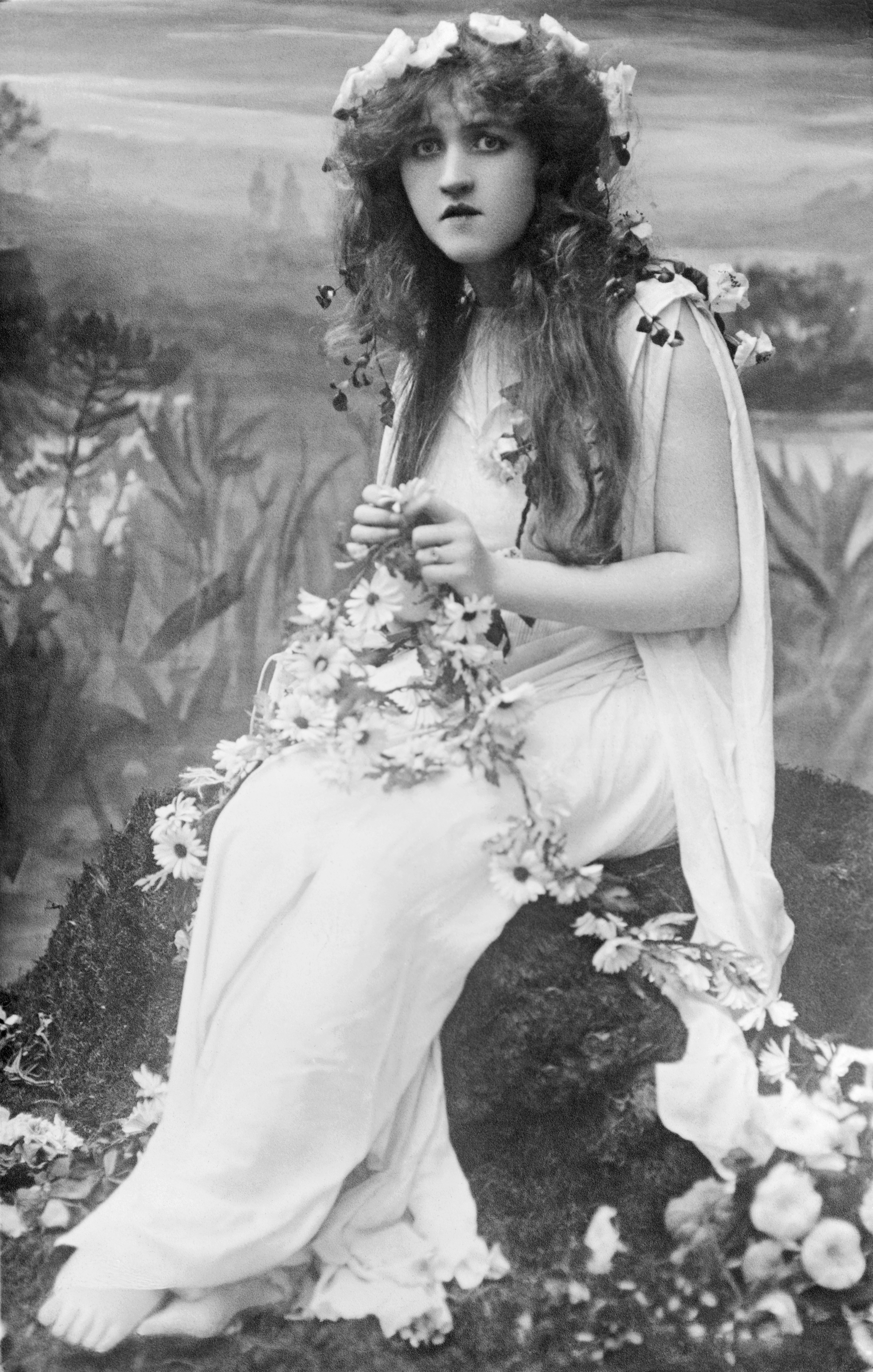
Mignon Nevada as Ophelia in Ambroise Thomas's opera, Hamlet, c. 1910

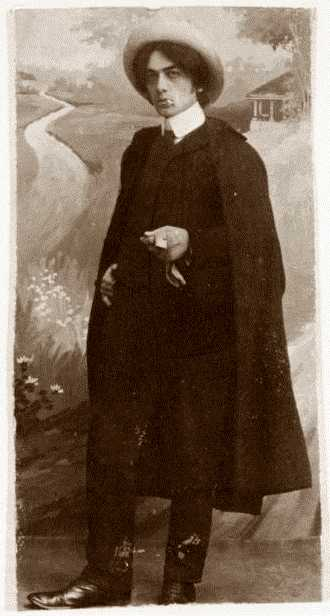
Johannes Holzmann, 1914, Europe

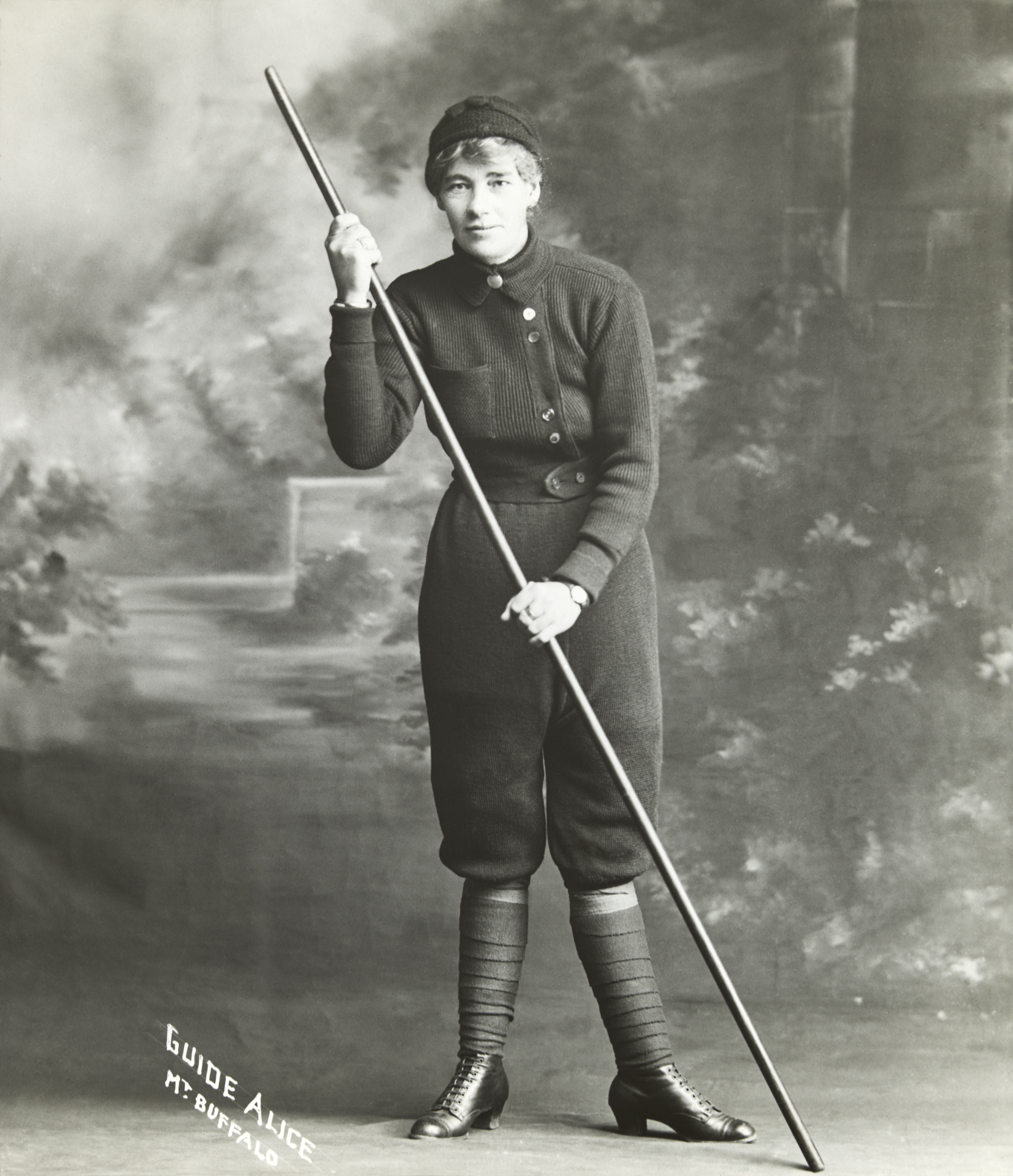
Guide Alice, Victoria, Australia, c. 1900–30
