= Buffalo City Hall =

Skyscraper and municipal building in Buffalo, New York

- U.S. National Register of Historic Places
- New York State Register of Historic Places
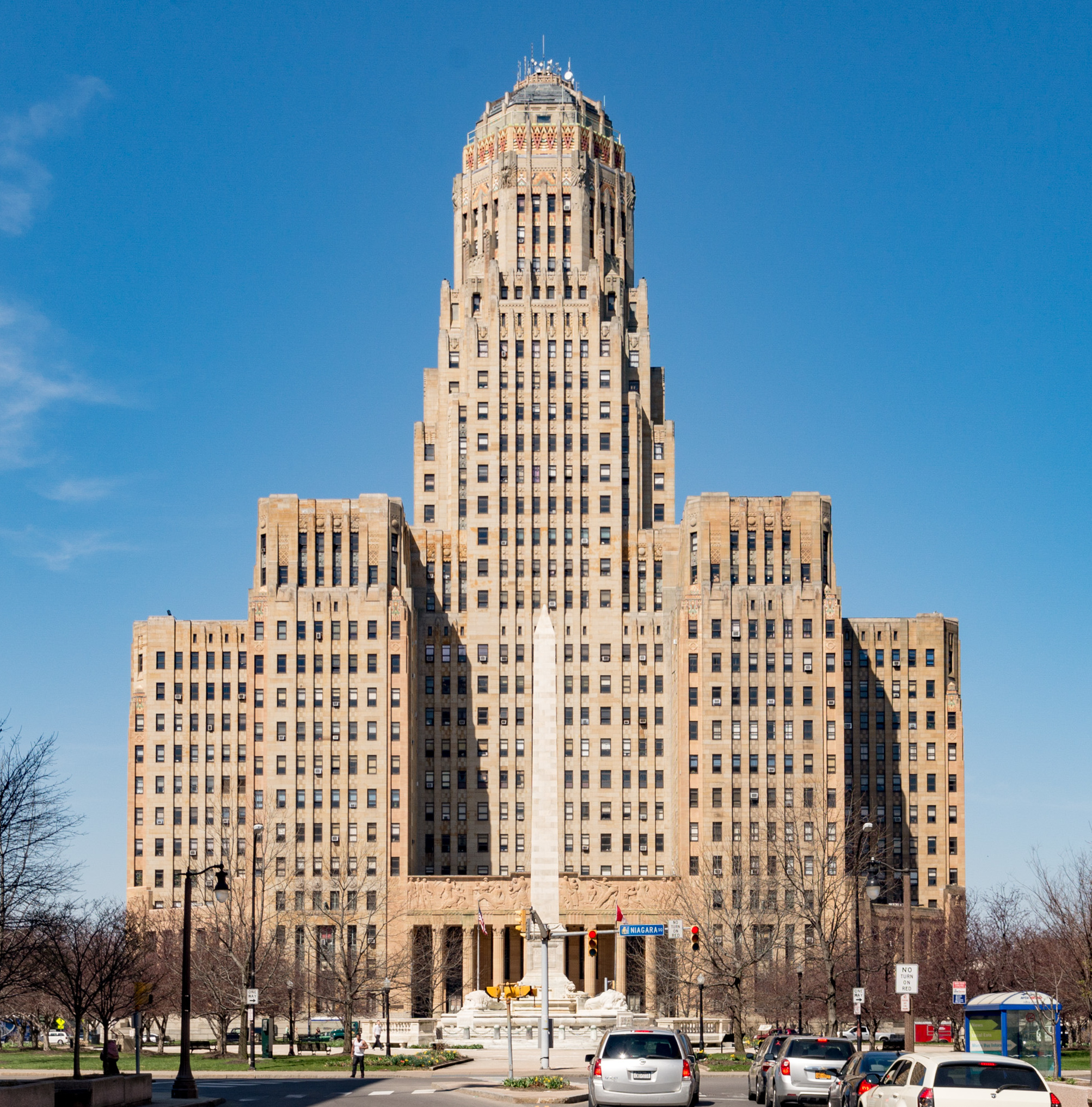
- Buffalo's City Hall
- Location: 65 Niagara Square, Buffalo, NY
- Coordinates: 42°53′11.73″N 78°52′45.49″W
- Area: less than one acre
- Built: 1930; 96 years ago
- Architects: Dietel, Wade & Jones
- Architectural style: Art Deco
- NRHP reference No.: 98001611
- NYSRHP No.: 02940.002974

Significant dates
- Added to NRHP: January 15, 1999
- Designated NYSRHP: December 7, 1998

Buffalo City Hall is the seat for municipal government in the City of Buffalo, New York. Located at 65 Niagara Square, the 32-story Art Deco skyscraper was completed in 1931 by Dietel, Wade & Jones.

The 398-foot-tall (121.3 m) building is one of the largest and tallest municipal buildings in the United States and is also one of the tallest buildings in Western New York. It was designed by architects George J. Dietel and John Wade. The friezes were sculpted by Albert Stewart and the sculpture executed by Rene Paul Chambellan. The foyer features a bronze tablet honoring Mayor Charles E. Roesch, created in 1937 by regional sculptor William Ehrich.

Buffalo City Hall was listed on the National Register of Historic Places in 1999. It is located within the Joseph Ellicott Historic District.

== History ==
=== Previous buildings ===
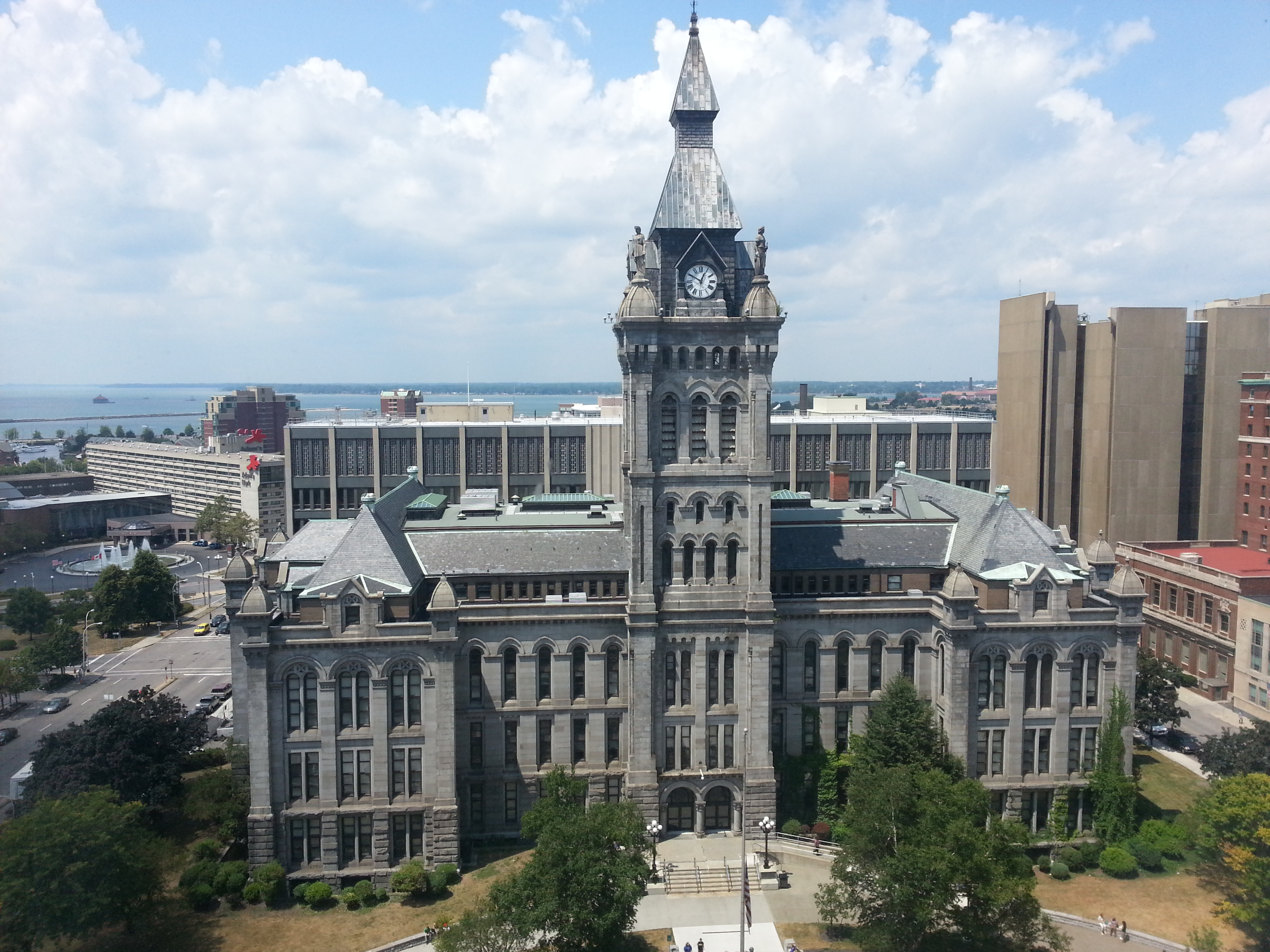
The 1875 Buffalo County and City Hall

In 1851, the city bought the property at the northwest corner of Church and Franklin streets in Buffalo to be used for the Mayor's office and other city offices. On this site, and constructed between 1871 and 1875, the city built a monumental granite structure designed by Rochester architect Andrew Jackson Warner (1833–1910). The building, now known as the Old County Hall, has four floors and a large, seven-story clock tower. It held offices for both the City of Buffalo and Erie County.

In 1920, the Buffalo Common Council decided, in light of the fact that the population of the city had quadrupled since the construction of County and City Hall forty-five years earlier, that a new building was needed to house the city government of Buffalo. Niagara Square was chosen as it is one of the central components of Joseph Ellicott's original plan of 1804, laid out for the City of Buffalo. From this location, one can see the waterways of Lake Erie and the shores of Ontario in Canada as well as the rest of downtown Buffalo. On September 16, 1929, construction of the new City Hall began and the building was ultimately completed on November 10, 1931 with the dedication taking place the following summer, on July 1, 1932, commemorating the city's Centennial celebration.

When the new City Hall opened and the city offices moved to the present building, the former 1875 County and City Hall became Erie County court offices. It is also the home of the Erie County Clerk's office, where important county records are kept. The former county and city hall was listed on the National Register of Historic Places in 1976.

=== Construction ===
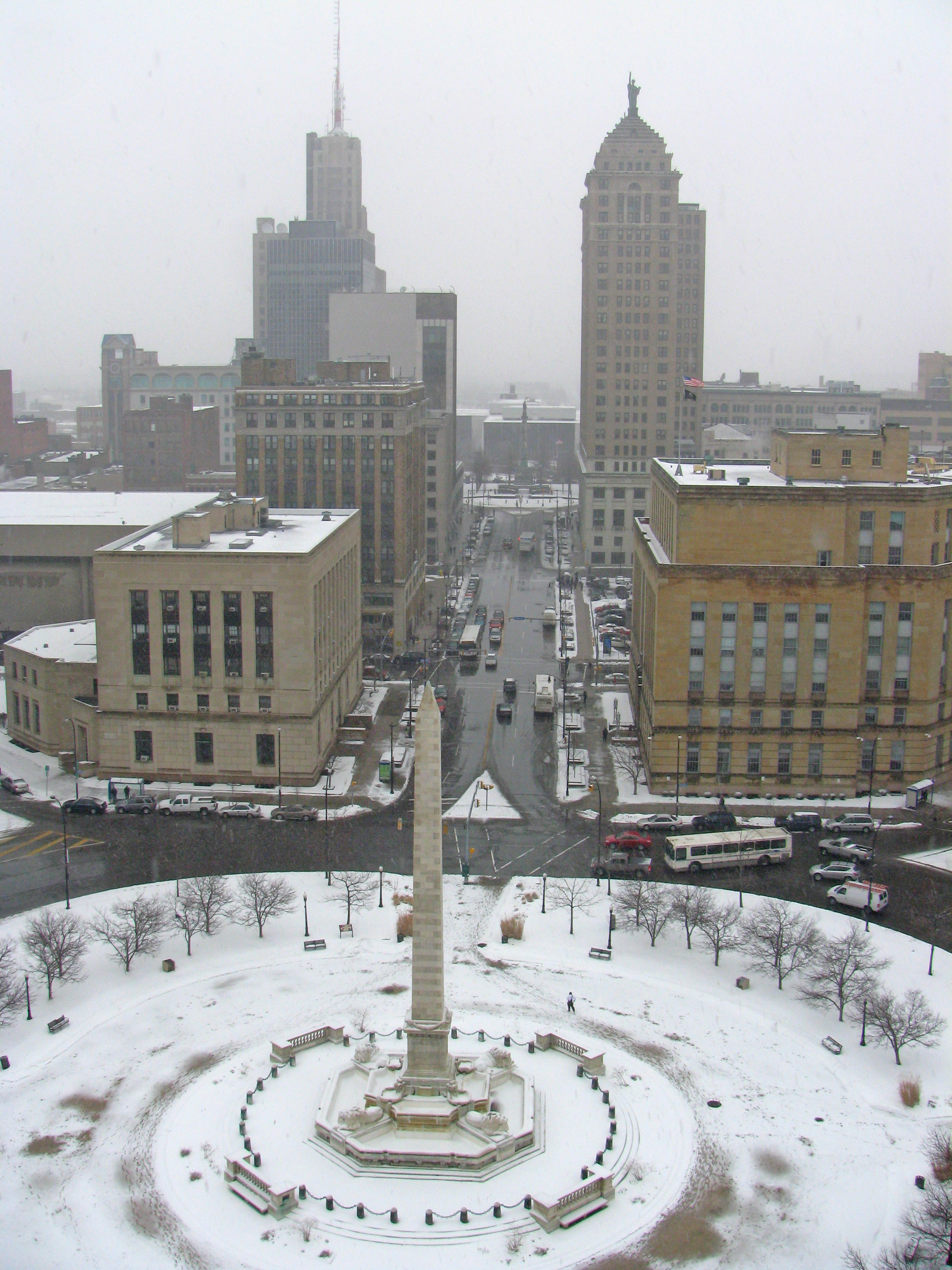
View of Niagara Square in the foreground and Lafayette Square in the background from Buffalo City Hall during a snow flurry

City Hall was built by the John W. Cowper Company, the same firm who built the Statler Hotel and the Buffalo Athletic Club, also on Niagara Square. The cost of building City Hall was $6,851,546.85 ($128 million in 2025 dollars) including the architect's fees, making it one of the costliest city halls in the country.

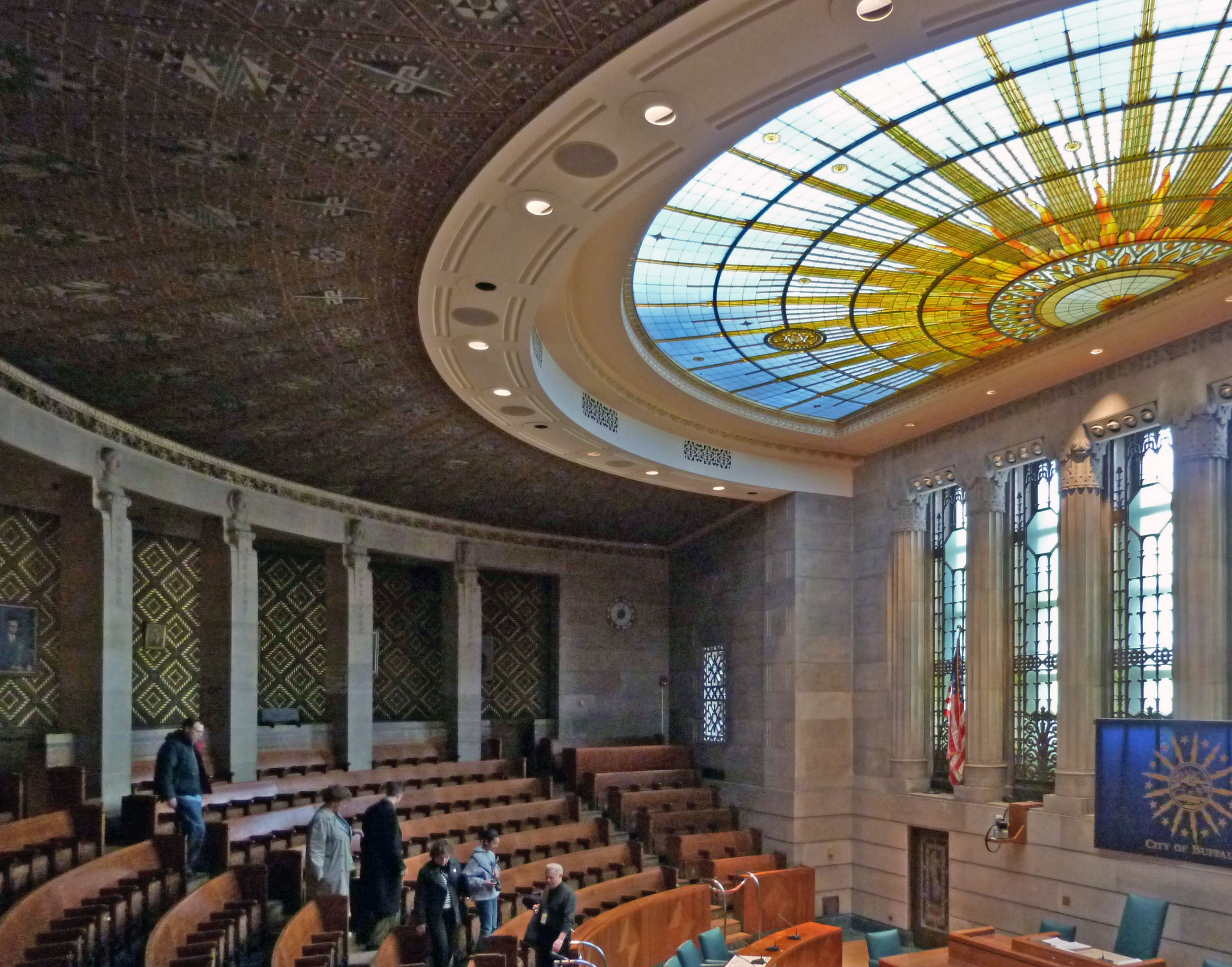
City Council chambers

City Hall has 32 stories, 26 of which offer usable office space. The total floor area is 566,313 square feet (52,612 m^{2}) and the footprint of the site on Niagara Square is 71,700 square feet (6,661 m^{2}). There are 1,520 windows from the first to the 25th floor. A practical design feature is that all of them open inward, making window washers unnecessary. There are eight elevators to the 13th floor and four to the 25th floor. Curtis Elevator Company furnished the first elevators, with additional elevators supplied later by Otis Elevator Company.

There are 5,000 electrical outlets, 5,400 electrical switches and 21 motor driven ventilation fans. Approximately 110 miles (180 km) of copper wire weighing 43 tons, and 47 miles (76 km) or 180 tons of conduit pipe, serve the building, as well as 26 miles (42 km) or five car loads of underfoot conduit. There are either 138 or 143 clocks (counts vary) regulated by a master clock in the basement and 37 fire alarm stations distributed throughout the building.

It was originally equipped with 375 telephones and a master switchboard. External illumination was provided from dusk to midnight by 369 flood lights with an average candlepower of 350.

=== Architecture and design ===
Along with the contemporaneous Buffalo Central Terminal (1929), City Hall is regarded as one of the two most prominent examples of Art Deco architecture in Buffalo. Both buildings employ setback massing and feature Indigenous American decorative motifs.

==== Architect selection ====
The project to design a new city hall was initially led by architect John Wade, who proposed a 25-story tower emphasizing verticality and modern office efficiency. City officials rejected the proposal for exceeding budget constraints and lacking sufficient administrative space. Wade subsequently partnered with George J. Dietel, a Buffalo architect experienced in public buildings, and New York consultant Sullivan W. Jones, who specialized in tall structures. The resulting firm, Dietel, Wade & Jones, produced the finalized 32-story Art Deco design. The project was approved without a formal open competition, reflecting a preference for local talent and iterative refinement.

When asked to describe the building's style, architect John Wade referred to it simply as "Americanesque, 1927," and at other times called it Babylonian. Like other tall buildings of its era, the design incorporated setbacks as the building rose, in conformance with emerging zoning practices intended to admit light and air to the street below.

==== Exterior ====
The exterior is faced with Ohio sandstone and gray Minnesota limestone, above a base of gray granite. Near the top of the building are three-dimensional chevrons of polychrome terra cotta. Below these are bands of terra cotta with American Indian motifs; the band is interrupted at the corners by large stone eagles.

The entrance colonnade and frieze feature extensive sculptural ornamentation. The friezes were sculpted by Albert Stewart and the sculpture executed by Rene Paul Chambellan. The shafts of the entrance columns are shaped as large octagonal nuts with rivet heads, while the lintel molding is styled to depict a saw, portraying the power of Buffalo's industry. Above the main entrance, sandstone relief panels depict the hardship of the American pioneer: a woman harvesting, a man hunting deer, a woman weaving a basket, and a man constructing a log cabin.

The figures on the Elmwood Avenue side of the building represent nine significant events in the development of Buffalo's history, including the surveying of the city, the building of the Erie Canal, and the opening of the previous City Hall in 1876. Among the lunettes over the entrance, the Construction lunette is notable for including a small figure working on a model of City Hall—a depiction of architect John Wade himself.

Four bronze doorways at the entrance originally featured Iroquois symbols but were later removed to make way for revolving doors.

==== Interior ====
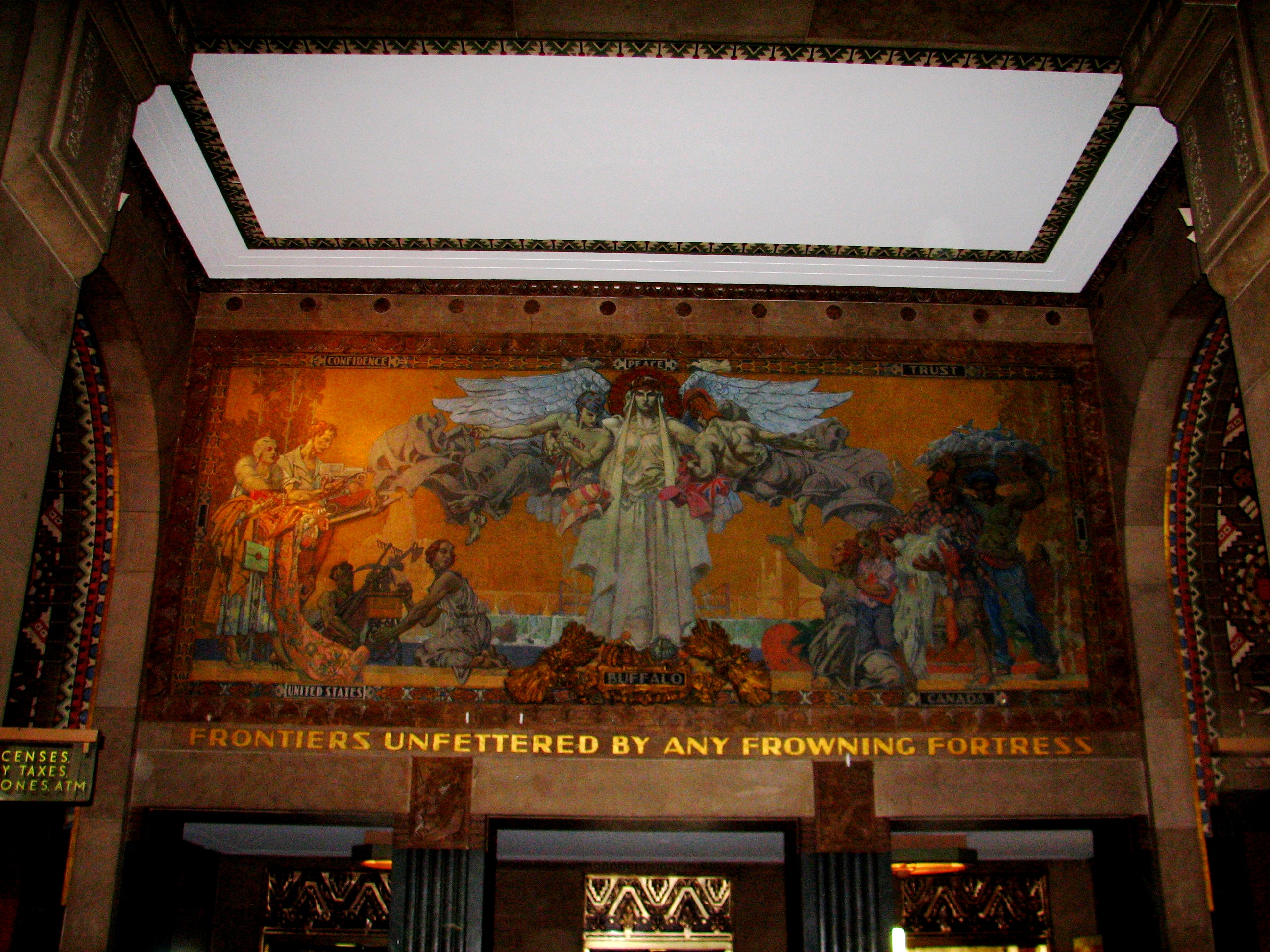
William de Leftwich Dodge mural in the main entrance hall

The main lobby features a high domed ceiling with brightly colored tiles arranged in a pattern inspired by an American Indian chief's headdress, with the sun depicted at the center. Four statues in the lobby represent the characteristics of good citizenship: Virtue, Diligence, Service, and Fidelity. The ceiling vault was executed by Rafael Guastavino.

Four corridors extend from the lobby, each containing colorful murals by William de Leftwich Dodge depicting Buffalo's industries. The large painting at the front of the main lobby, entitled "Frontiers Unfettered by Any Frowning Fortress," depicts Buffalo as an international gateway to Canada, with a central female figure representing peace between the two nations.

The 13th-floor Common Council Chamber features a large art glass sunburst skylight. The chamber is ringed by twelve pillars, the crowns of which depict civic virtues. The pillars were originally intended to hold busts of prominent Buffalonians, but the Council could not agree on who should be represented, and architect Wade intervened to substitute the virtues instead.

Bronze statues of former presidents Grover Cleveland and Millard Fillmore—both with strong ties to Buffalo—stand outside the building. The statues were sculpted by Bryant Baker.

==== Observation deck ====
An observation deck on the 28th floor, approximately 360 feet (110 m) above street level, provides panoramic views of the city, Lake Erie, and on clear days, the mists of Niagara Falls. Elevators serve the building to the 25th floor; the remaining three floors to the observation deck are accessible only by stairs. The observation deck and a one-hour guided tour of the building are offered free of charge on weekdays.

=== Mechanical systems ===
City Hall was designed and built with a non-powered air-conditioning system, taking advantage of strong prevailing winds from Lake Erie. Large vents were placed on the west side of the building to catch wind, which would then travel down ducts to beneath the basement, to be cooled by the ground. This cooled air was then vented throughout the building. Winds off the lake were usually strong enough to power air through this system.

=== Renovations ===
In 2002, the 13th-floor Common Council Chamber underwent a major restoration designed by HHL Architects. The project addressed damage to the decorative glass ceiling and hand-painted masonry decorations. Lighting and sound systems were upgraded, cork floors on the stairs were replaced, stone was cleaned, and wooden seating for spectators was added.

In the summer of 2006, Buffalo City Hall started undergoing renovations from the 13th floor all the way to the top as the flood lights were replaced; three years later, it was the south wing that started undergoing renovations of its own. Renovations were completed by 2009.

== In popular culture ==
In February 2020, director Guillermo del Toro filmed scenes at City Hall and Niagara Square for his 2021 neo-noir film Nightmare Alley, starring Bradley Cooper and Cate Blanchett. The building's Art Deco lobby and hallways stood in for a 1940s setting; del Toro praised the architecture, saying "This building is 1932, it's perfect for the movie and it is also still 1932." It was del Toro's second time filming in Buffalo, following Crimson Peak in 2015.

In the American television series Avenue 5, Buffalo City Hall is the new White House.

=== Folklore ===
In 2018, an urban legend emerged, claiming that a fire broke out at City Hall at an unspecified time in the 19th or 20th centuries and all of the records that were housed in there at the time had been destroyed. Local historians later debunked the claim as false.

== Gallery ==
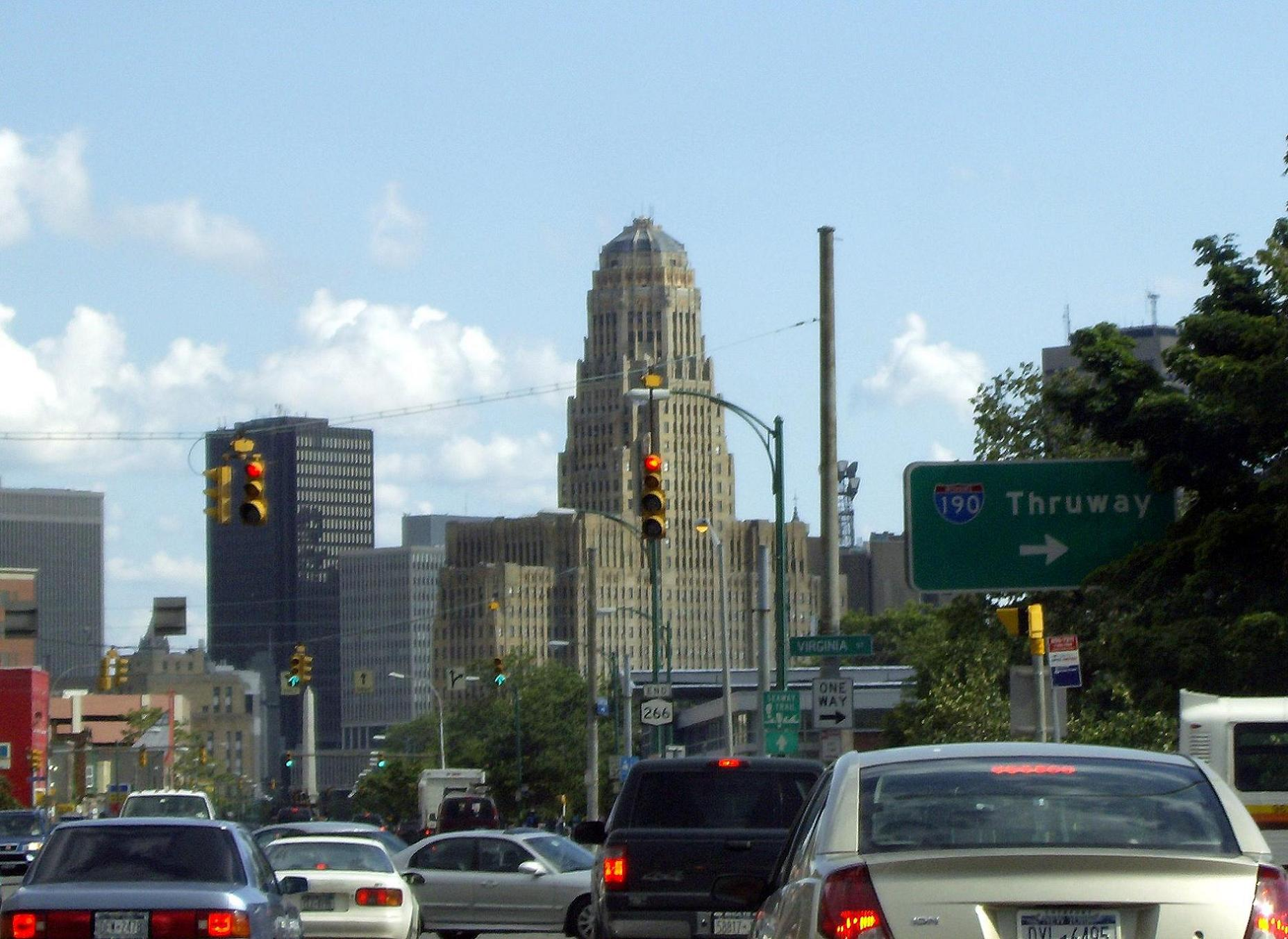
City Hall viewed from afar

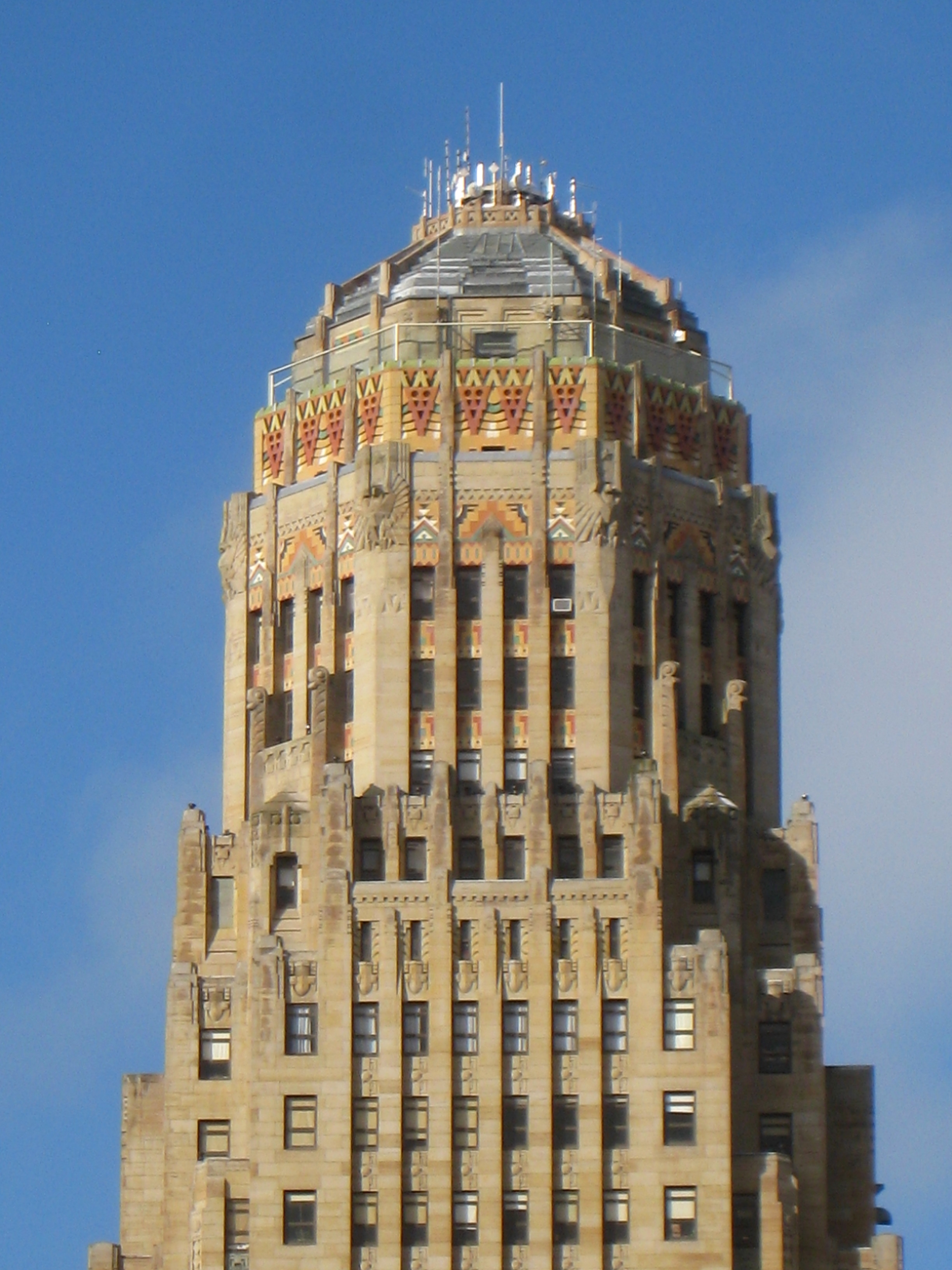
View of upper floors Art Deco details

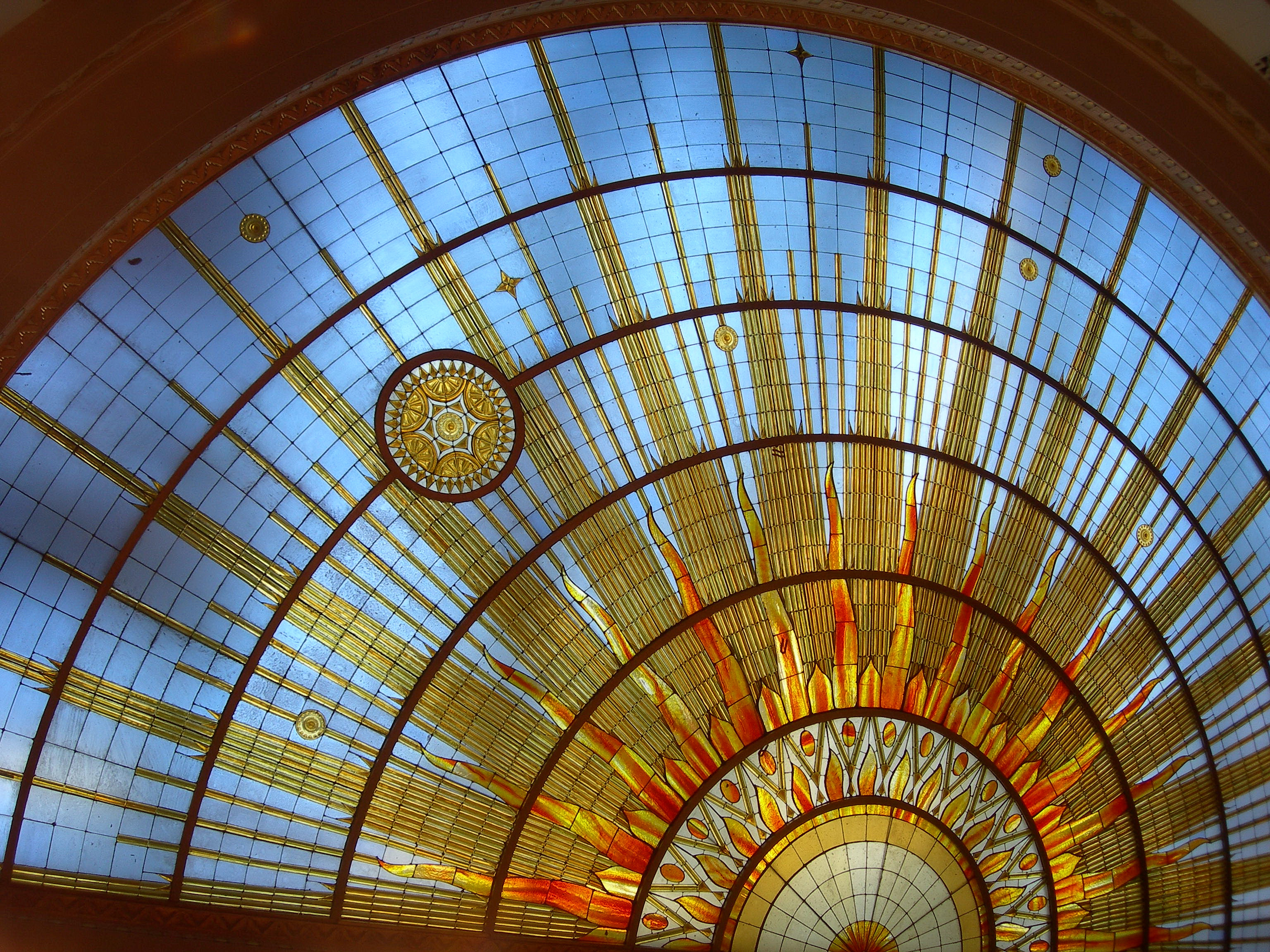
Detail of the council chamber's stained glass

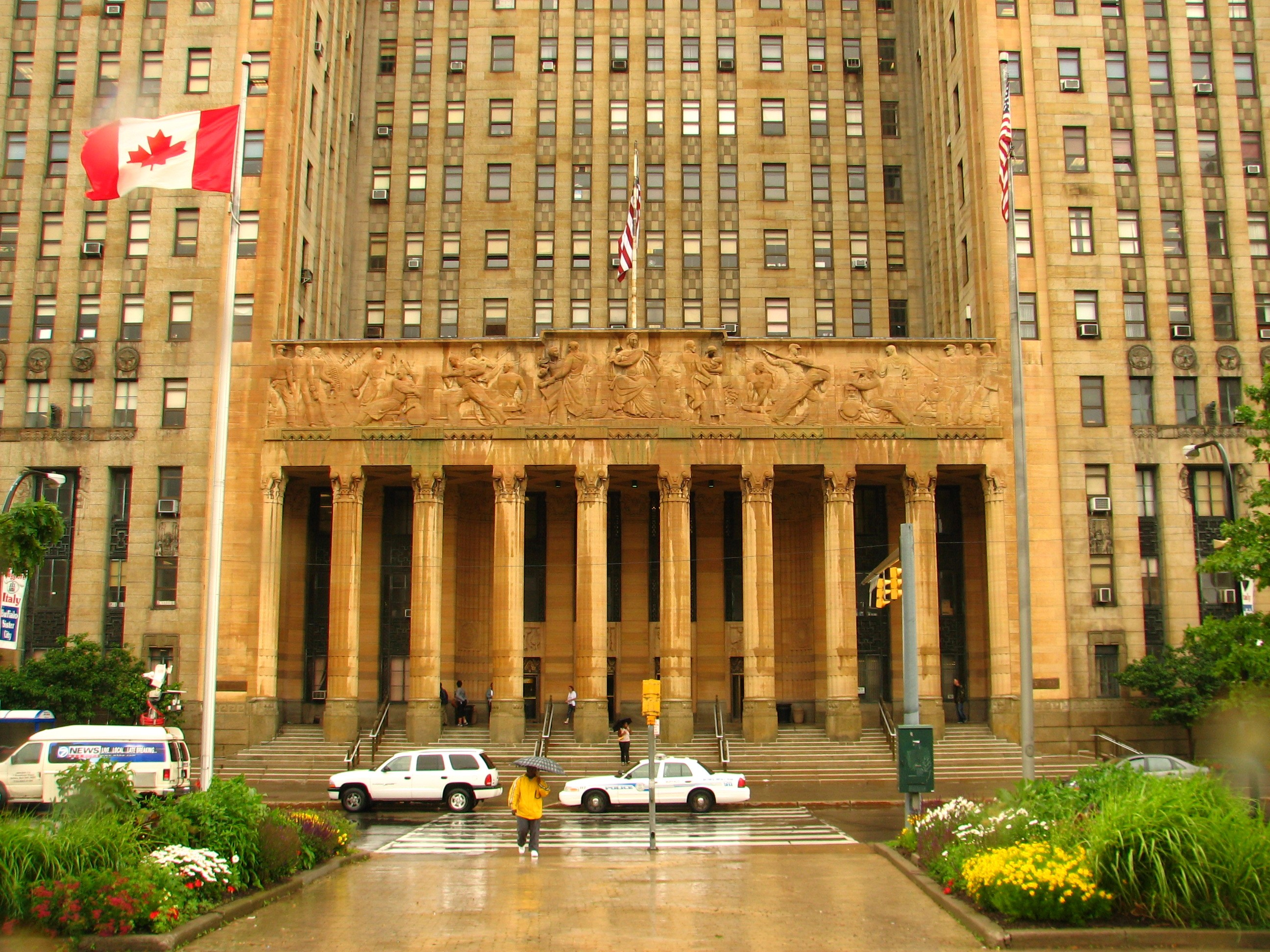
Relief sculptures over front entrance

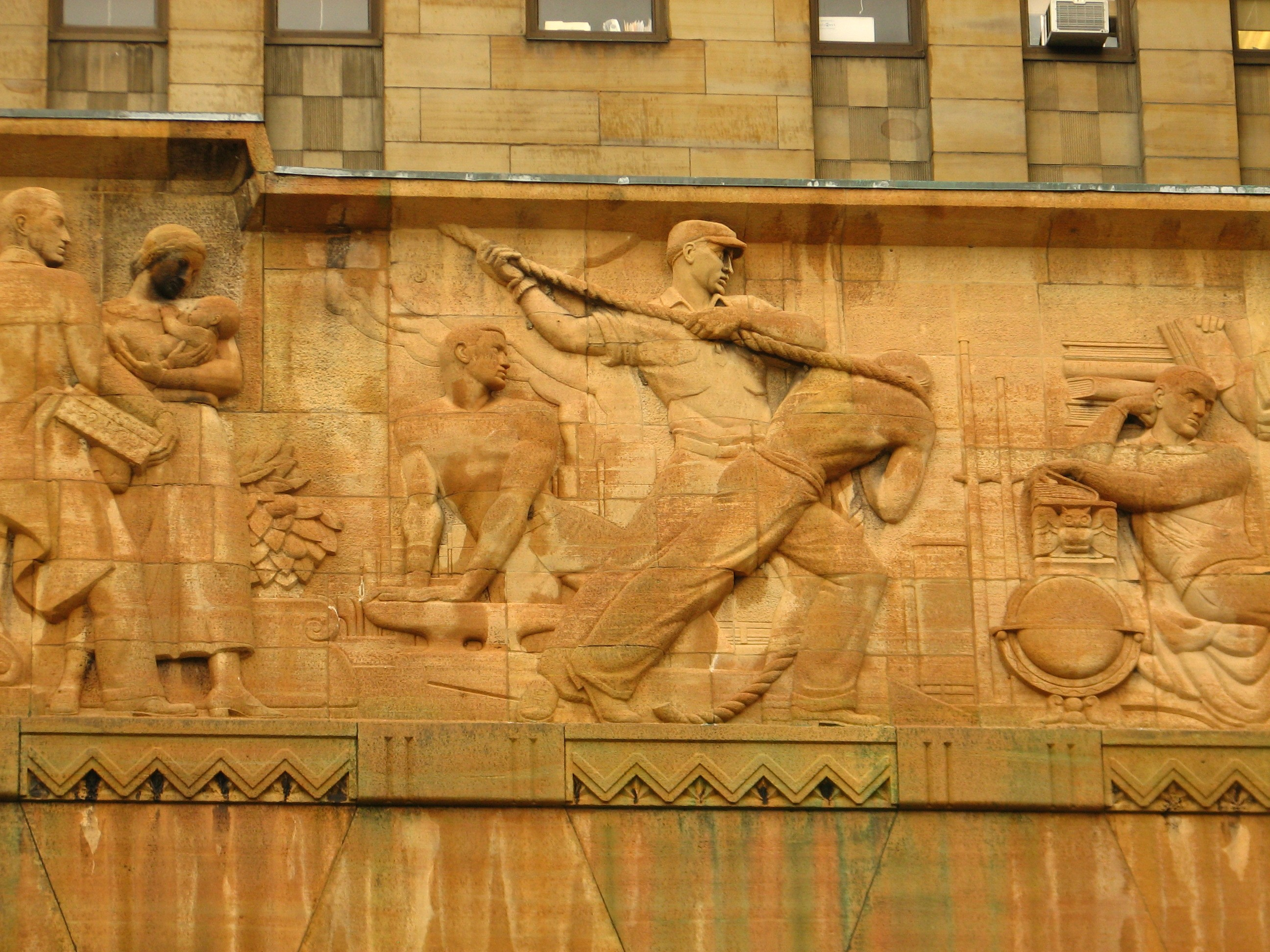
Detail of entrance relief sculptures

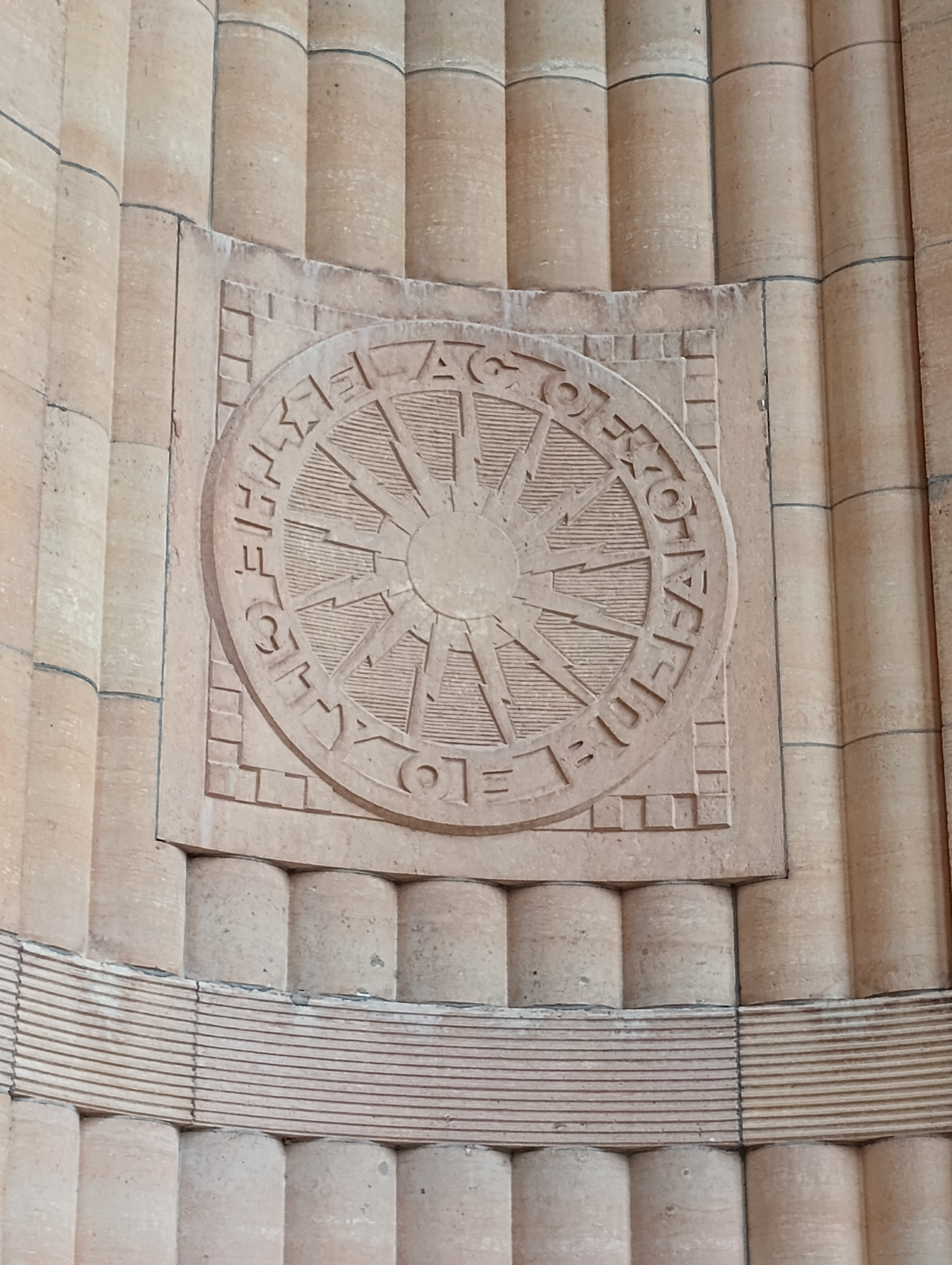
Relief of the flag of Buffalo next to the main entrance

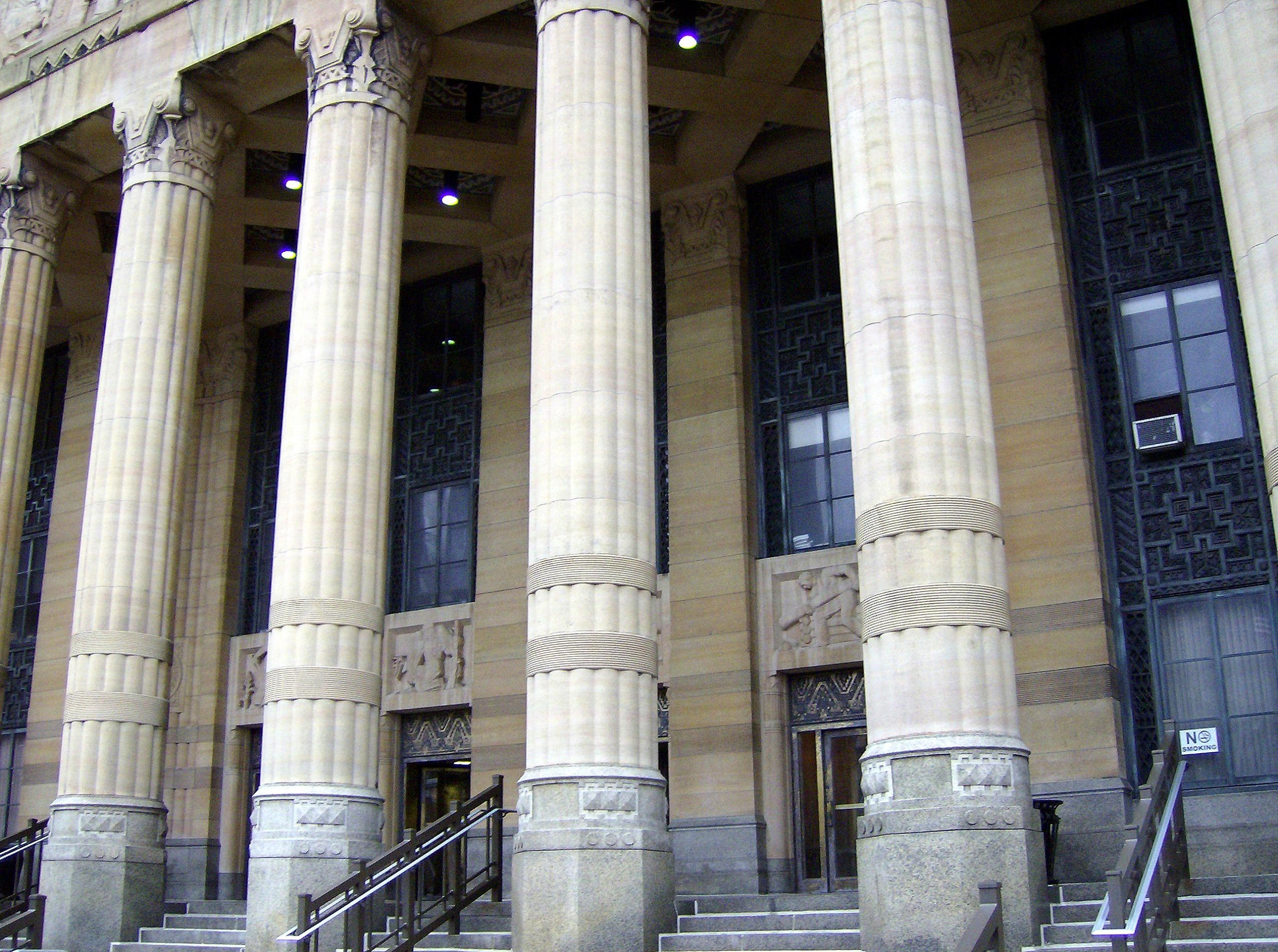
Pillars at entrance with relief sculpture

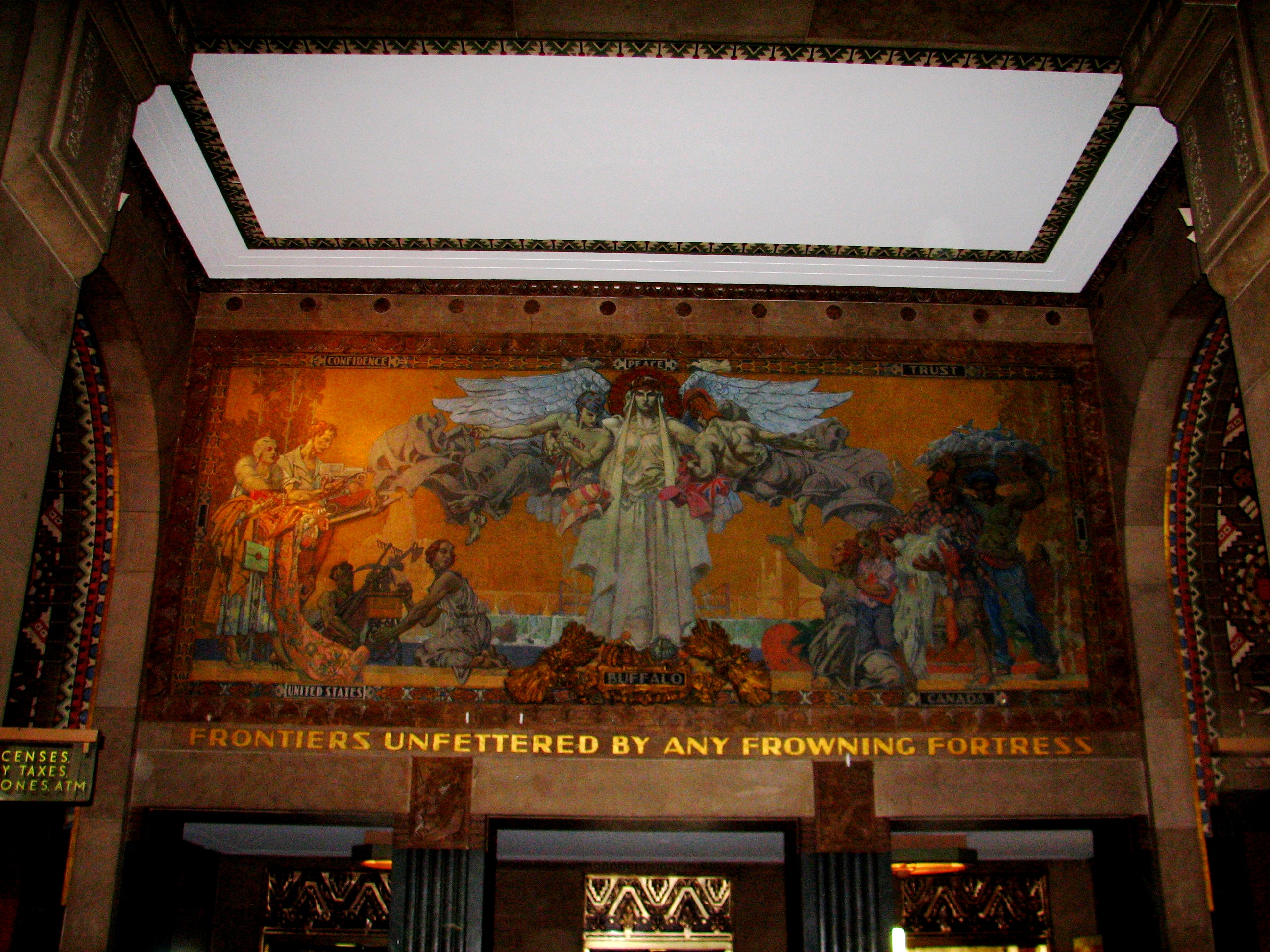
William de Leftwich Dodge mural in east side of main entrance hall

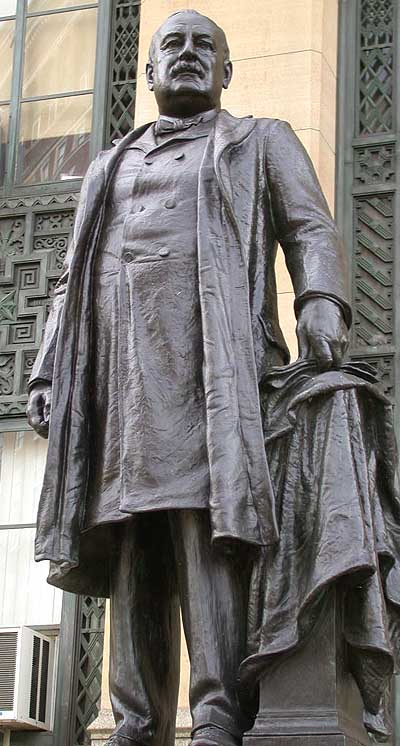
Statue of Grover Cleveland

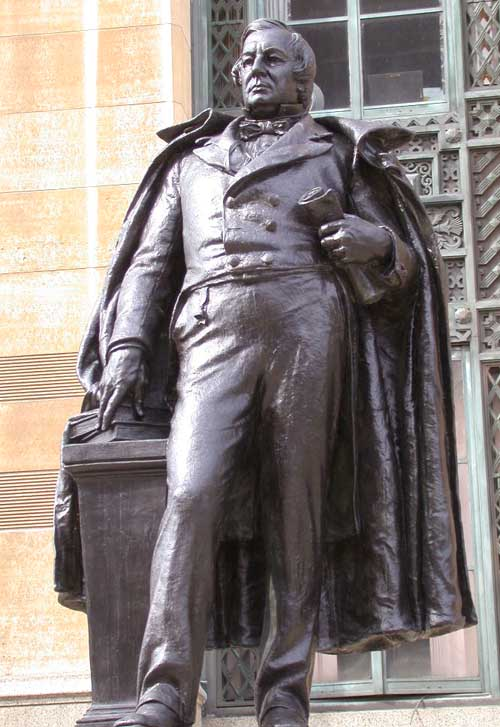
Statue of Millard Fillmore

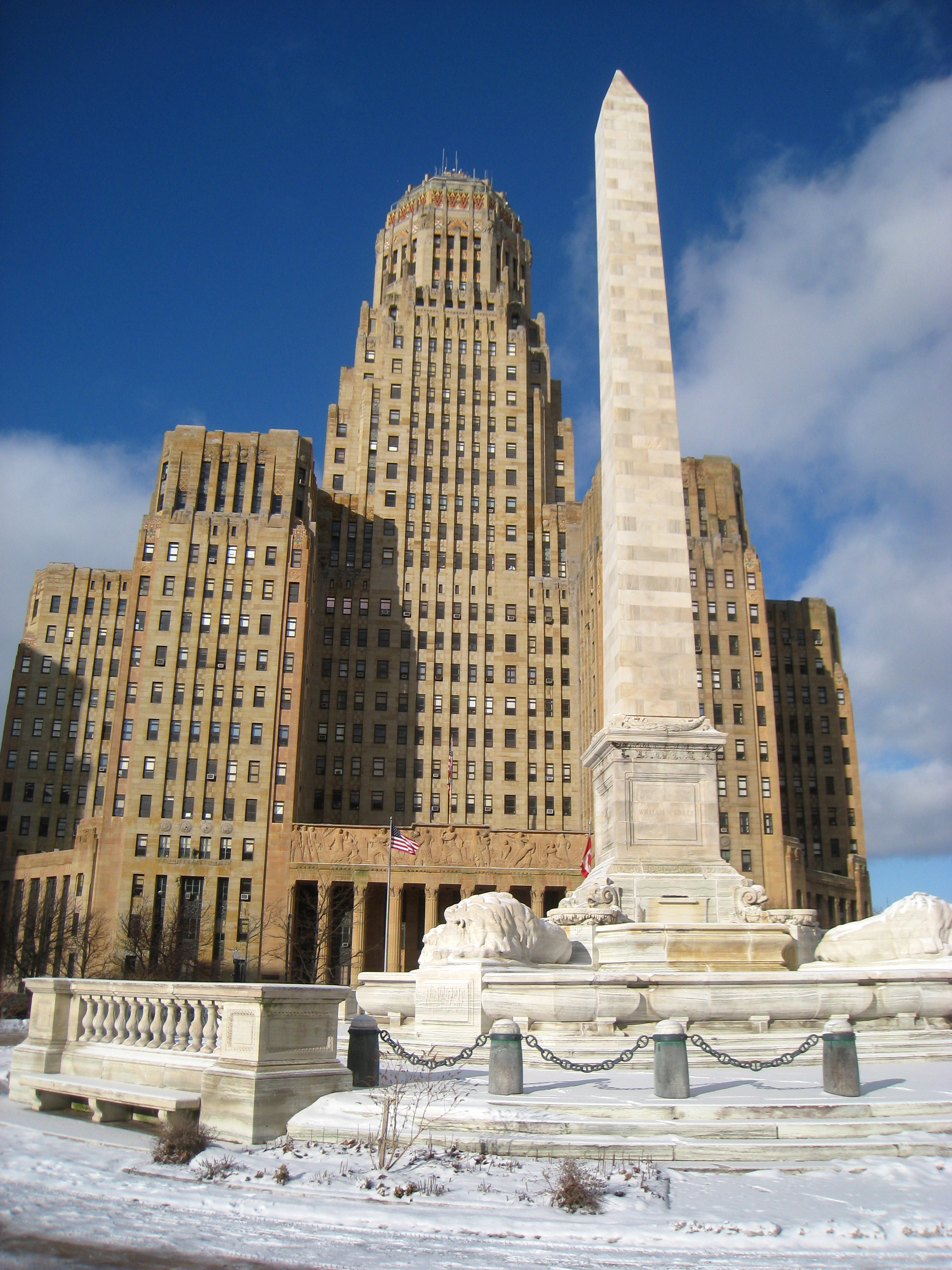
William McKinley Monument

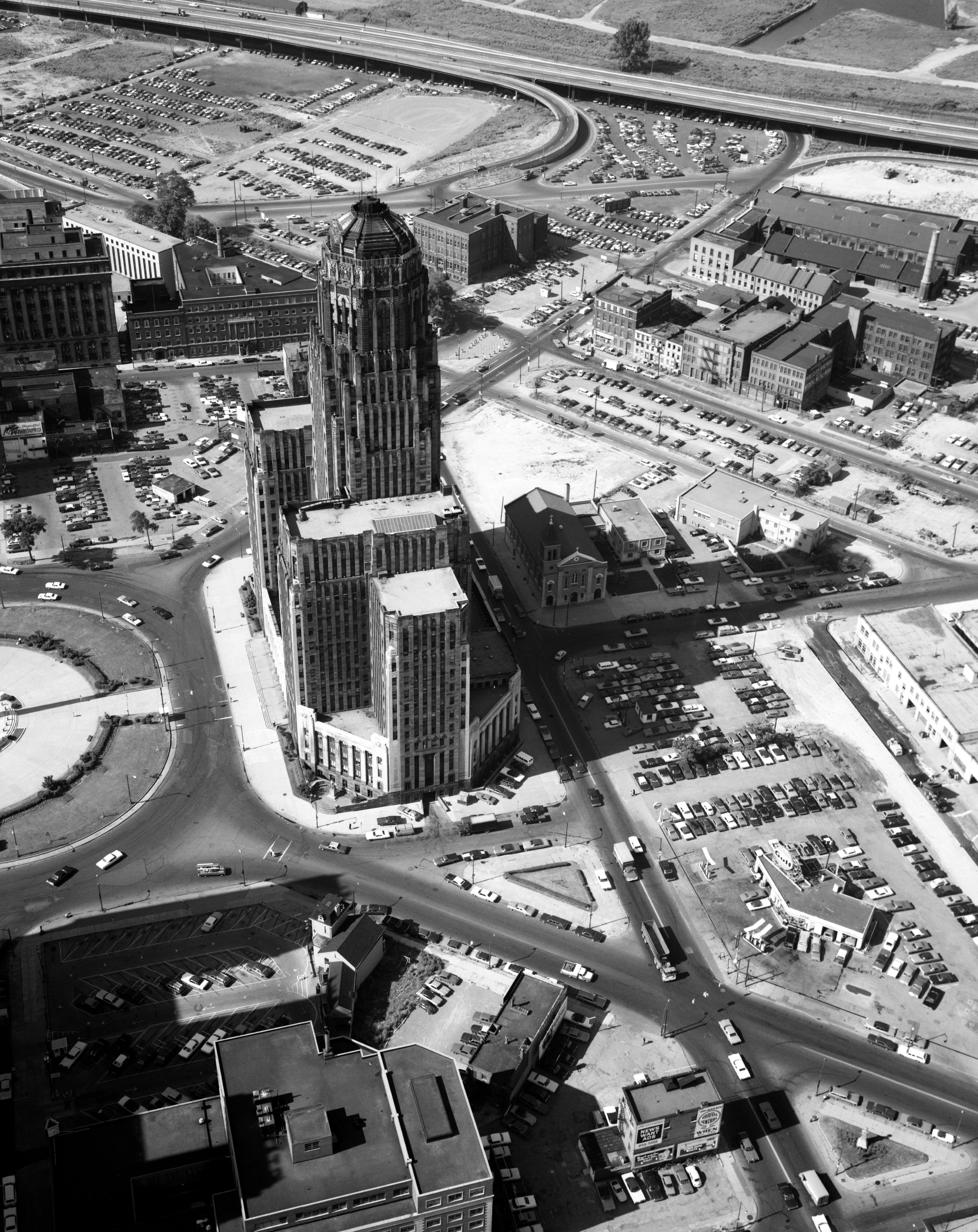
Aerial view, 1971

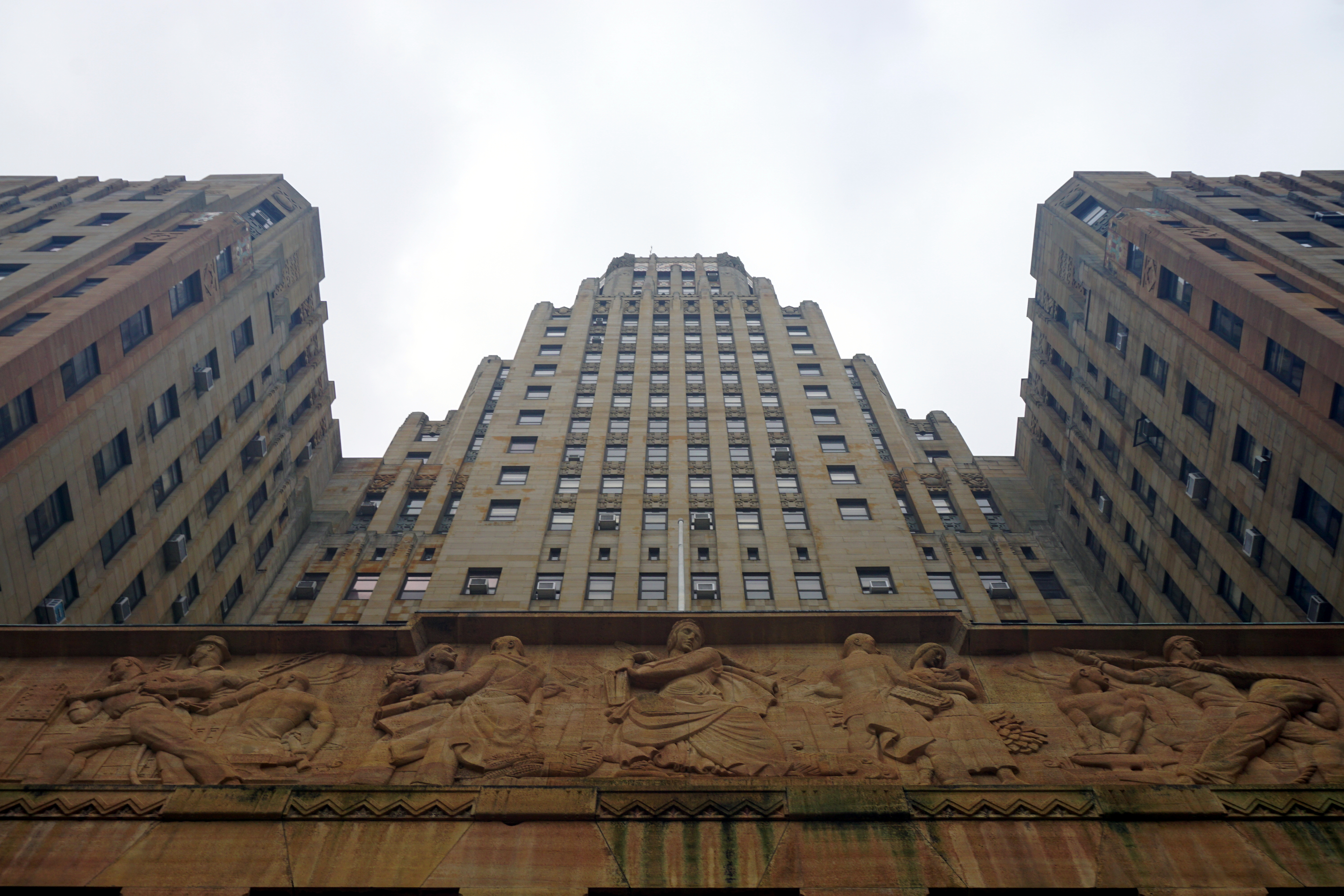
View from main entrance, looking up

== See also ==
- List of tallest buildings in Buffalo, New York
