= Pioneer Woman =

Sculpture by Bryant Baker in Ponca City, Oklahoma

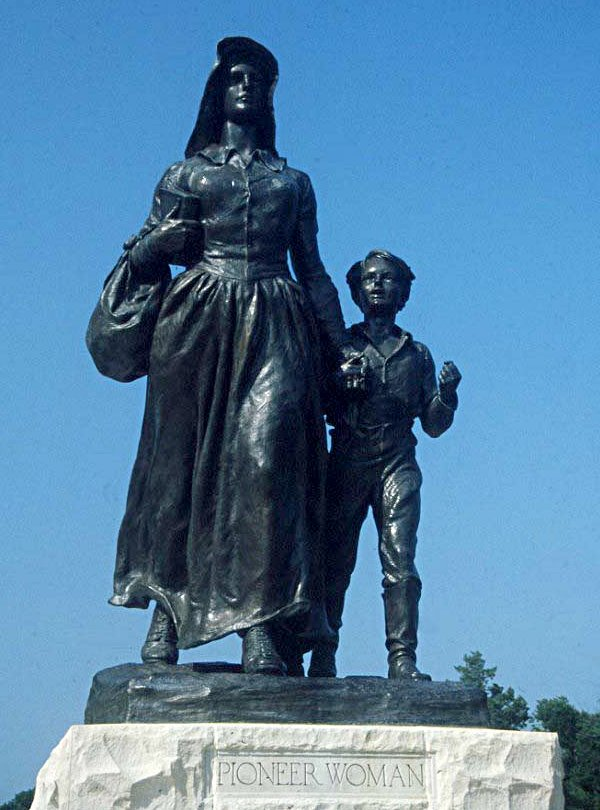
- Artist: Bryant Baker
- Year: 1930
- Type: Bronze statue
- Location: Ponca City, Oklahoma
- Pioneer Woman Statue
- U.S. National Register of Historic Places
- Location within Oklahoma Location within the United States
- Coordinates: 36°42′36″N 97°3′55″W
- NRHP reference No.: 78002238
- Added to NRHP: August 31, 1978

The Pioneer Woman monument is a bronze sculpture in Ponca City, Oklahoma, designed by Bryant Baker and dedicated on April 22, 1930. The statue is of a sunbonneted woman leading a child by the hand. It was donated to the State of Oklahoma by millionaire oilman E. W. Marland. He commissioned models from twelve well-known sculptors and financed a nationwide tour to get feedback from art critics and the general public in order to decide which model to use for the final statue.

== Design and construction ==
Around 1925 Marland sketched out an ambitious sculptural program to sculptor Jo Davidson involving numerous statues based on the theme of the settling of the American West and attempted to persuade Davidson to take it on. When Davidson declined Marland replies that he could pay for it, prompting Davidson to come back with "I don't doubt it for a minute, but I don't see myself working for you for the rest of my life." Marland ultimately convinced Davidson to go to Ponca City, Marland's then home town, and create three statues for him: one of Marland and one of each of Marland's adopted children, Lydie and George.

While Davidson was producing his three Marland statues E.W. told him of another project that he has in mind, "E.W.'s most cherished dream." Davidson writes, " It was to be a twenty-five foot figure, which he planned to put up on a hill where it could be seen for miles ... E.W. brought his friends to see what I was doing. He acted as if he was the sculptor, and in conversation would say that he was doing the figure - that I was his hands."

=== The models ===
At that point Marland sent out invitations to many of America's leading sculptors, offering them each a $10,000 honorarium to produce a roughly 3 feet (0.9 m) tall bronze model for the statue. He further proposed that the models tour the United States and that the American public vote as to which of the models would be erected in Ponca City. Several sculptors, Daniel Chester French, George Grey Barnard and Paul Manship turned Marland down, also declining were the only two women invited, Gertrude Vanderbilt Whitney and Anna Hyatt Huntington, leaving him with an even dozen artists, all males. The artists who submitted models were Bryant Baker, A, Stirling Calder, Jo Davidson, James Earle Fraser, John Gregory, F. Lynn Jenkins, Mario Korbel, Arthur Lee, Hermon Atkins MacNeil, Maurice Sterne, Mahonri Young, and Wheeler Williams. The models were to tour America and everyone who visited the sites where they were exhibited was allowed to vote for their favorite.

Marland's original idea was to have a woman in pioneer dress accompanied by a child, and so he provided a sunbonnet to each sculptor. While the artists were not limited to these ideas, nine of the twelve models included a sunbonnet and all save for Jo Davidson's included a child. Both Davidson and Calder visited Oklahoma to gain further inspiration.

Mahonri Young's biographer Thomas Toone relates that Young produced not only the required three foot tall statuette, but also a plaster version of the entire Pioneer Memorial as he envisioned it, replete with detailed bas-reliefs of western scenes around the base of a massive pedestal and platform, on top of which the pioneer woman "holds her child in the embrace of a Renaissance Madonna." A pair of spirited bison guard the stairs leading up the base. The voting public was not privy to Young's vision and his work showed poorly in the balloting. Young, who described not winning the competition as the worst disappointment in his career, did manage to get some of his ideas out in later works.

Toone also adds that the winning sculptor, Baker Bryant used, "a professional actress as his model, which produced a glamorous figure, representing Western myth more than reality."

There are some questions raised about the winning design by Donald De Lue, at that time Baker Bryant's chief assistant. De Lue's biographer, D. Roger Howlett makes several points about the Pioneer Woman statue.

Wheeler Williams model, enlarged and cast in Liberty, Kansas

"it was especially on the "Pioneer Woman" that De Lue manifest his talent ... ... Baker claimed that the conception and movement of the final monument was developed in an eight-to-ten inch sketch model made by him a few hours after he learned about the competition. De Lue executed the thirty-three inch competition model for the sculpture in 1927, with Baker supervising and completing the face." Baker was also the last sculptor to enter the contest having only one month to prepare his model.

James Earle Fraser based his almost Impressionistic statue on his favorite aunt, Dora, who was herself a pioneer woman. This model is unique among the ones submitted to the competition, and perhaps in the entire world of Pioneer Women Statues, in that the woman, caught breast feeding her child, exposes a bare breast. No stranger to multi-tasking, she still manages to hold on to her rifle while feeding the baby.

Many years after the competition Wheeler Williams' model was re-discovered, enlarged, cast, and now sits in front of the public library in Liberty, Kansas.

=== The tour ===
The submitted bronze models were unveiled at the Reinhardt Galleries in New York on February 26, 1927, where they remained in exhibition until March 19. At a dinner for the twelve finalists the evening before the models were revealed to the public, Marland announced:

Pictures have we in plenty of the stern Pilgrim Fathers and the gallant gentlemen of the friendlier Virginia soil, but we are forced to draw on our imagination somewhat for pictures of the mothers. When these women started West all their earthly possessions could be packed on a horse or in a wagon. What sturdy broods they bore, ever pushing westward, ever making homes on the lands their husbands gained. The toll of life resulting from their hardships left millions of unmarked graves across this continent, graves of women who dies that we might live and love this homeland.

Marland reserved the right to make the final choice for the monument, but he sought input from the public and so these models then began a tour of museums and art galleries across the nation. From its opening at the Reinhardt Galleries, the tour moved on. Stops included Boston, Pittsburgh, Cincinnati, Buffalo, Detroit, Indianapolis, Chicago, Minneapolis, Kansas City, Dallas, Oklahoma City, Fort Worth, and Ponca City. At each location visitors were invited to vote for their three favorite models. In all over 750,000 people viewed the models and over 120,000 votes were placed.

The models were the subject of much discussion at the time, and photographs of them were included in full-page pictorials of both the New York Times and the LA Times. Art critics discussed the merits of one model over another and almost universally lambasting the sunbonnets as "terrible headwear". The models were even the subject of writing assignments for elementary school art classes.

The L.A. Times reported that art critic Helen Appleton Read felt that "no adequate tribute had been paid to the pioneer woman" and that "most of the competitors failed to produce anything monumental".

On December 20, 1927, E. W. Marland's son George announced that Bryant Baker's model was selected as the winner. Baker's model received the most votes in 11 cities and Gregory's was the second most popular, being the favorite in three cities.

When the tour of the models was over, Baker's Pioneer Woman had won first place, out-balloting John Gregory's effort 42,478 to 37,782. "De Lue set to work in 1928 and 1929, modeling it in Baker's Brooklyn studio, working with Jean La Seure, the enlarger. De Lue later remembered: "One day Bryant decided he would work on it, and did some work. I said, 'Look, Bryant, if I were you I'd get the hell out of here, because you're not helping at all,' He said, 'Thank you very much.' and he went."

=== Fundraising and construction ===
The cost of the Pioneer Woman project was approximately $350,000. This included a $10,000 honorarium for each of the twelve finalists plus $100,000 for the winner Bryant Baker. The remainder of the costs were accrued during the tour around the country and arranging the base for the statue. While the vast majority of the project was funded by Marland, his fortunes were on the decline at this time and so he was forced to seek additional funding to complete the project. Some private fundraising helped to defray the final costs and $25,000 was supplied by Lew Wentz, Marland's long-time business rival as well as fellow philanthropist of Ponca City. After much private debate and encouragement, Lew Wentz in 1929 loaned money to Marland enabling him to make final payments for the statue, secured by a real estate mortgage and arranged by a local banker, resulting in Wentz filing a lawsuit in 1936 to collect on the non-performing loan [see Ada Weekly News, 12 March 1936].

Marland had purchased 2,000 acres on which to place the statue. The area where the statue was erected stands just off of U.S. Route 77, a mile northeast of the center of Ponca City.

Baker said the work took years off of his life and he was afraid he would die before completion.

=== Dedication ===
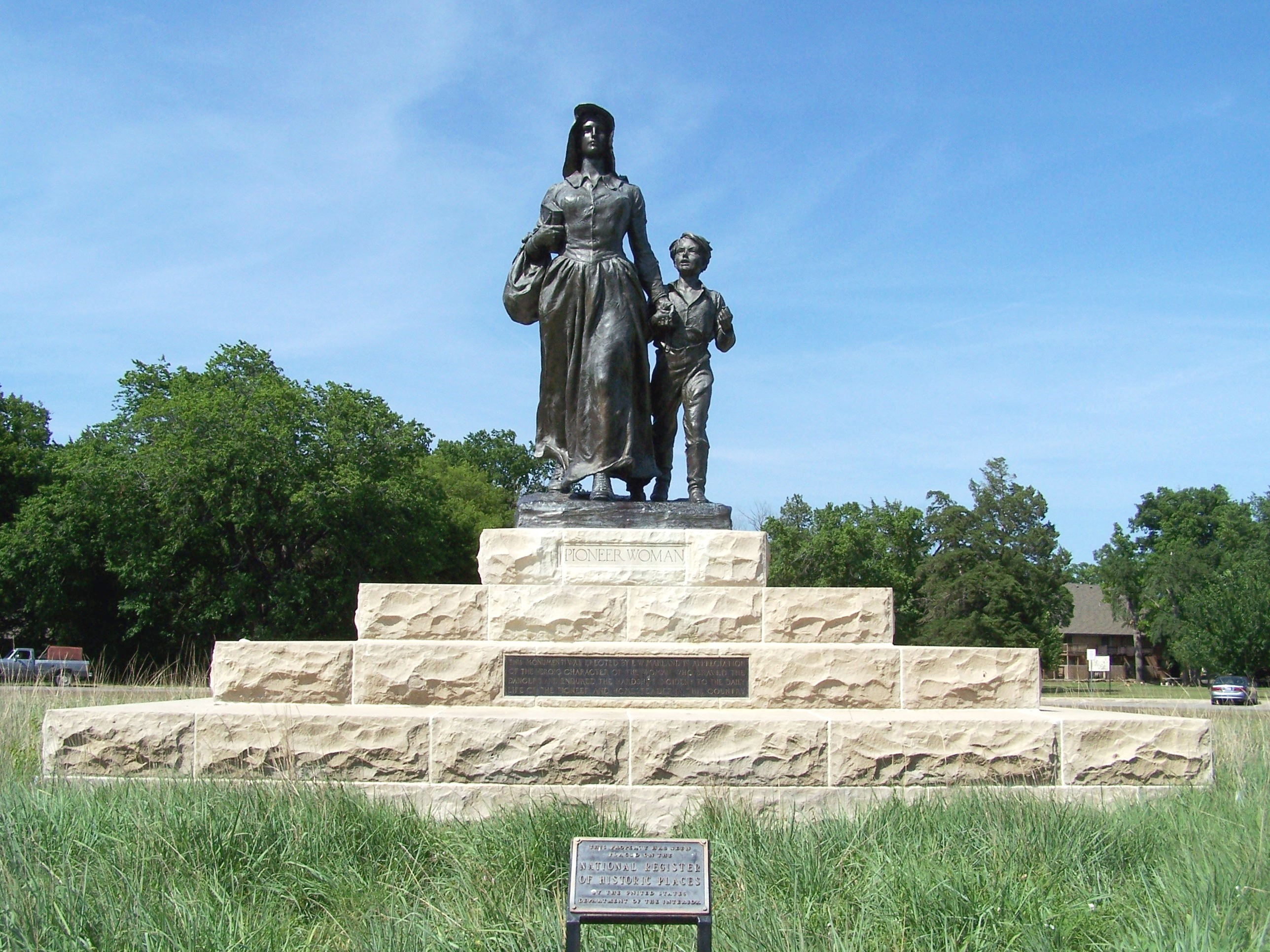
The Pioneer Woman statue and base.

On April 16, 1930, it was announced that the statue would be unveiled on April 22, 1930, on the 41st anniversary of the Land Run of 1889 which opened the Oklahoma Territory to settlers. The day was declared a state holiday by the governor and the celebration in Ponca City included a parade, 19-gun salute. An estimated 40,000 people attended the unveiling.

The dedication itself began at 1:30 pm central time with a nationwide radio address on WJZ by United States President Herbert Hoover broadcasting from the White House. He introduced the native Oklahoman, Secretary of War Patrick J. Hurley who had intended to attend the unveiling in person before his visit was curtailed by illness and so spoke from his home. After the first half-hour the broadcast continued from Ponca City. Other speakers during the 90 minute broadcast were Marland, Baker, Episcopal Bishop of Oklahoma Thomas Casady, Oklahoma Governor William J. Holloway, and Oklahoma humorist, Will Rogers, who closed the unveiling ceremonies.

Mr. Chairman and fellow-citizens gathered at Ponca City:

It is a pleasure both to address a great audience gathered to do honor to the pioneer woman and to support my friend, the Secretary of War, who, to your and my misfortune, cannot yet leave his room from recent illness, from which happily he is on the road to recover.

There are few men of the West of my generation who did not know the pioneer woman in his own mother, and who does not rejoice to know that her part in building that great civilization is to have such beautiful recognition.

It was those women who carried the refinement, the moral character and spiritual force into the West. Not only they bore great burdens of daily toil and the rearing of families, but they were intent that their children should have a chance, that the doors of opportunity should be open to them. It was their insistence which made the schools and the churches.

But it is my duty to introduce a product of the pioneer woman of Oklahoma, who has risen high in the councils of the nation—and high in the esteem of the whole country—the Secretary of War, Patrick J. Hurley.

— Herbert Hoover

In the erection of this monument, we pledge a reverence to the woman who has laid the foundation of the character of our community, State and nation. This tribute to her memory will keep the fundamental principles of her character constantly before the people of Oklahoma. Every citizen who passes this way and looks upon this memorial will be strengthened in the conviction that this State shall be kept worthy of the woman whom this bronze statue commemorates.

...

Woman has never been given her just place in history as a pioneer, an educator, a builder, or as a leader. This is probably due to the fact that most of the pages of history are written by men about men.

Historians have been so busy with the lives of great sons that they have not stopped to immortalize the mothers who produced them. The characters of men are molded by women. We have reached that period in civilization where we are fair enough to accord to woman the honor of the pre-eminent part she has taken in shaping the destinies of mankind.

The woman has held the objectives gained by the man. She has been the bulwark ever standing between civilization and barbarism. The pioneer woman has played her part in the conquest of nature through all the ages.

We cannot evaluate her character without any appreciation of her intelligence. Here was an intelligence that quickly and clearly recognized that the three great pillars of democratic government are religion, education and the home. She trusted in God and was a firm believer in the efficacy of prayer.

— Patrick J. Hurley

=== History since dedication ===
The area surrounding the statue has been designated as Pioneer Woman State Park. In 2002 the Pioneer Woman statue underwent renovations, including the repair of a 4-inch crack in the heel of the boy's left boot. "This is the first professional restoration of the statue since the artist himself directed a cleaning a few years after it was erected," said Kathy Dickson, Historical Society museums director. "Where the mortar is still in place, damage is being caused by the type of mortar. Where it is missing, water is accelerating damage - especially in winter as water penetrates the cracks and expands when temperatures dip below freezing." Pledges of $75,000 were made by private foundations, individual donors, the Northern Oklahoma Development Authority, the city of Ponca City and Conoco to pay for repairs, lighting and landscaping around the statue.

Image of the statue used on a tee-shirt

=== The Pioneer Woman Museum ===
On September 16, 1958, the 65th anniversary of the opening of the Cherokee Outlet which included the land of Ponca City, the state opened the Pioneer Woman Museum, on land adjacent to the monument. An image of the Pioneer Woman statue serves as the de facto logo of the museum. On April 23, 2016, the Oklahoma Historical Society and the Friends of the Pioneer Woman Statue and Museum celebrated the opening of the new entrance and lobby at the Pioneer Woman Museum.

== Access and attributes ==
=== Location and visiting ===
The statue resides on a 5.5 acres (0.022 km^{2}) park.

=== Physical characteristics ===
The bronze statue itself stands 17 feet (5.2 m) tall and weighs 12,000 pounds (5,400 kg). It stands on a pyramidal stepped base of granite blocks which brings the total height of the monument to 40 feet (12 m).

The statue faces to the southwest, symbolising that the majority of the settlers had come from the northeast.

There is a plaque on the first step beneath the statue which reads:

this monument was erected by e. w. marland in appreciation
of the heroic character of the woman who braved the
dangers and endured the hardships incident to the daily
life of the pioneer and homesteader in this country

Image used on cook book cover.

== Depictions ==
The image of the Pioneer Woman has long been a symbol of Ponca City.

In 1941 as part of their 50th anniversary celebrations the General Federation of Women's Clubs presented gold and bronze medals with a bas-relief of the Pioneer Woman to prominent and long-standing members.

The statue is also the official emblem of the four-state Ozark Frontier Trail.

When the State Quarter for Oklahoma was to be issued in 2008, there was a statewide call for proposals to be sent to the Mint for final design work. From the thousands of designs received, five were sent along to the mint. Four of the five submitted designs included the Pioneer Woman. When the professional designs returned from the mint in order for the people of Oklahoma to decide on the final design by voting amongst them, none of the designs included the book which is held under the Pioneer Woman's arm. As this book is often thought to be a Bible, this was viewed as an attempt at censorship by the government and caused a statewide controversy. Eventually the fifth design was selected.

That the book was intended to be the Bible was made clear by Baker in an interview in which he stated, "In trying to symbolize the Pioneer Woman of America I wanted to depict Courage and Faith ... The Bible was a vital factor in building up this country, and it often was the one indispensable book, recording the facts of the family life, of births, marriages and death and often the only reading material available for mothers to teach their children to read and write in those days."

== Derivative works ==
There have been several notable works of sculpture proposed or produced in the years following the unveiling of the Pioneer Woman based on it. The first one was the Kansas Pioneer Woman Memorial. A competition by the Pioneer Women's Memorial association was held and, as in the competition for the Ponca City statue, Bryant Baker was the winner. A Kansas critic at the time pointed out, "There is a striking similarity in the appearance of the two works despite many actual differences." However this version of a Kansas monument was never completed. In 1937 the Pioneer Women's Memorial association presided over the unveiling of the Kansas Pioneer Memorial by Kansas born sculptor Merrell Gage, a work very different from Baker's.

In 1959 a 36' tall fiberglass sculpture by Gordon Shumaker was produced to commemorate the first 100 years of the Minnesota State Fair. It stands in front of the Pioneer Building. Like the Ponca City statue, it depicts a bonneted woman in ankle length dress striding forward, and like its predecessor, she holds a large book/Bible in her right crooked arm as well as carrying a large bundle on the same arm. At 36 feet tall she more closely approaches the monumentality that Marland was originally seeking for his work.

Hardship and Dreams was the title of a sculpture by Dorothy Koelling (1913–2004) unveiled in Wichita, Kansas on June 28, 1994. A newspaper article at that time described the work as being, "inspired by the monumental 'Pioneer Woman' in Ponca City, Okla." Koeling's six foot tall statue depicts the bonneted pioneer woman, carrying a large book/Bible and bundle in her right arm, marching forward with her flatfooted son, whose hand she holds, next to her.

== See also ==
- Marland Mansion
- Madonna of the Trail
