= Statue of Millard Fillmore =

Statue in Buffalo, New York

Millard Fillmore
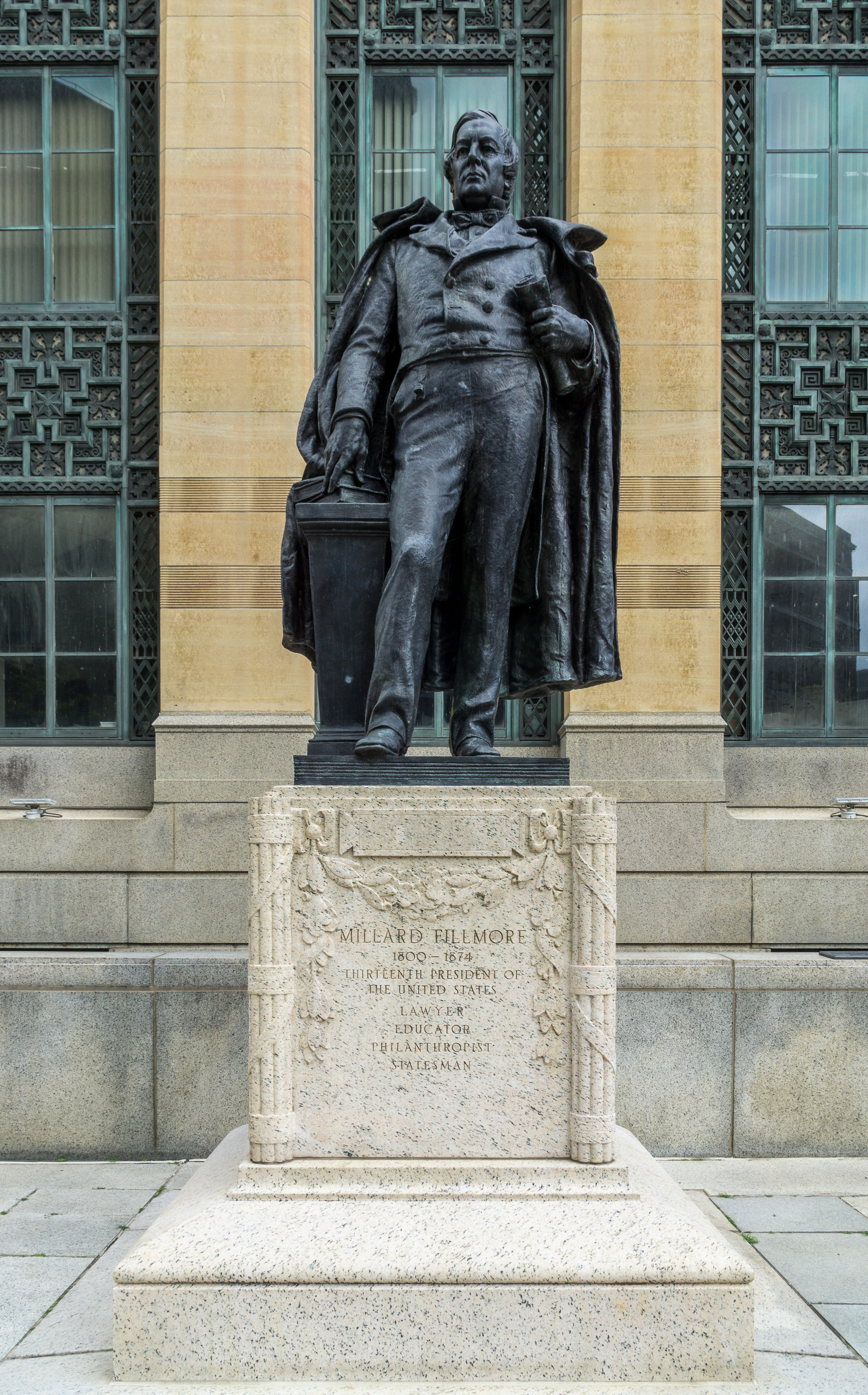
- The statue in 2019
- Interactive map of Millard Fillmore
- Location: Buffalo City Hall, Buffalo, New York, United States
- Coordinates: 42°53′10″N 78°52′45″W
- Designer: Bryant Baker
- Type: Statue
- Material: Bronze; Granite
- Length: 5 feet (1.5 m)
- Width: 5 feet (1.5 m)
- Height: 14 feet 6 inches (4.42 m)
- Completion date: 1930
- Dedicated date: July 1, 1932; 93 years ago
- Dedicated to: Millard Fillmore

Millard Fillmore is a monumental statue in Buffalo, New York, United States. The statue, located outside of Buffalo City Hall, was designed by sculptor Bryant Baker. It honors Millard Fillmore, the 13th president of the United States who lived in Buffalo. It was dedicated on July 1, 1932, in conjunction with a nearby statue of Grover Cleveland, another former president from Buffalo, which was also designed by Bryant Baker.

== History ==
=== Background ===
Millard Fillmore was born in 1800 in the Finger Lakes area of upstate New York. In the 1820s, he moved to the Buffalo metropolitan area and began practicing law. After moving to Buffalo city proper, he began a career in politics, holding positions in the New York State Assembly and the United States Congress, among other offices. In 1849, he became the vice president of the United States under Zachary Taylor and, after Taylor's death in 1850, he became the president. In the 1852 presidential election, the Whig Party decided against nominating Fillmore as their candidate, and as a result, after finishing his term, he returned to Buffalo, where he eventually died in 1874.

As president, Fillmore has a poor or unremarkable reputation amongst the general American public, primarily due to his stance on slavery. Although personally opposed to the institution, as president he signed into law the Fugitive Slave Act of 1850 as part of the larger Compromise of 1850, which mandated that escaped slaves in free states be returned to their owners in slave states. However, in Buffalo, Fillmore enjoyed a large amount of public support due to his actions in the community, as he was a founder of the University at Buffalo and was influential in establishing numerous public institutions in the city, such as several museums and libraries.

=== Erection ===
A public statue honoring Fillmore was part of the original overall plans for the design of Buffalo City Hall. Bryant Baker, a world-renowned sculptor based in New York City, designed the statue, as well as a nearby statue of Grover Cleveland, another president from Buffalo. Both of these statues were crafted in 1930 and dedicated at the same time on July 1, 1932. The Fillmore statue was paid for by a $25,000 (equivalent to $471,000 in 2024) appropriation from the New York State Legislature.

=== Later history ===
In 1992, the statue was surveyed as part of the Save Outdoor Sculpture! initiative.

==== Calls for removal ====
In July 2020, The Spectrum, the student newspaper of the University at Buffalo, published an opinion piece from Professor Robert Silverman of the university's Department of Regional and Urban Planning advocating for the removal of the statue and other public honors to Fillmore. The opinion piece was published following the Buffalo police shoving incident that occurred near the statue amidst the then-ongoing George Floyd protests and argued that Fillmore's legacy included supporting slave patrols and opposing civil rights for freedmen following the American Civil War. This opinion piece followed a 2015 request from the local NAACP chapter in Buffalo asking the city to cease naming things in honor of Fillmore. In response, in 2020, Buffalo Mayor Byron Brown requested the city government to review all of the city's public monuments.

== Design ==
The monument consists of a bronze statue of Fillmore atop a granite pedestal. The statue is roughly 9 feet (2.7 m) tall and occupies a square base with side measurements of 3 ft (0.91 m), while the pedestal is 5 ft 6 in (1.68 m) and has length and width measurements of 5 ft (1.5 m) each. Fillmore stands wearing a Prince Albert coat and a cloak. The bottom front of the statue's bronze bears the sculptor's marks signature and year ("Bryant Baker 1932"), while the pedestal bears the following inscriptions:

MILLARD FILLMORE / 1800-1874 / 13th PRESIDENT OF / THE U.S. / LAWYER / EDUCATOR / PHILANTHROPIST / STATESMAN

— Front

E. PLURIBUS UNUM

— Left

Erected by / the State of New York / to honor an illustrious / citizen of Buffalo

— Rear

Additionally, the right side of the pedestal bears the city's seal.

The statue is situated in a triangular plot outside of the city hall, at the southeast corner to the left of the front entrance. The statue of Cleveland is situated in a triangular plot on the other side of the entrance.

== See also ==
- List of sculptures of presidents of the United States
