= John Gregory (sculptor) =

American sculptor (1879–1958)

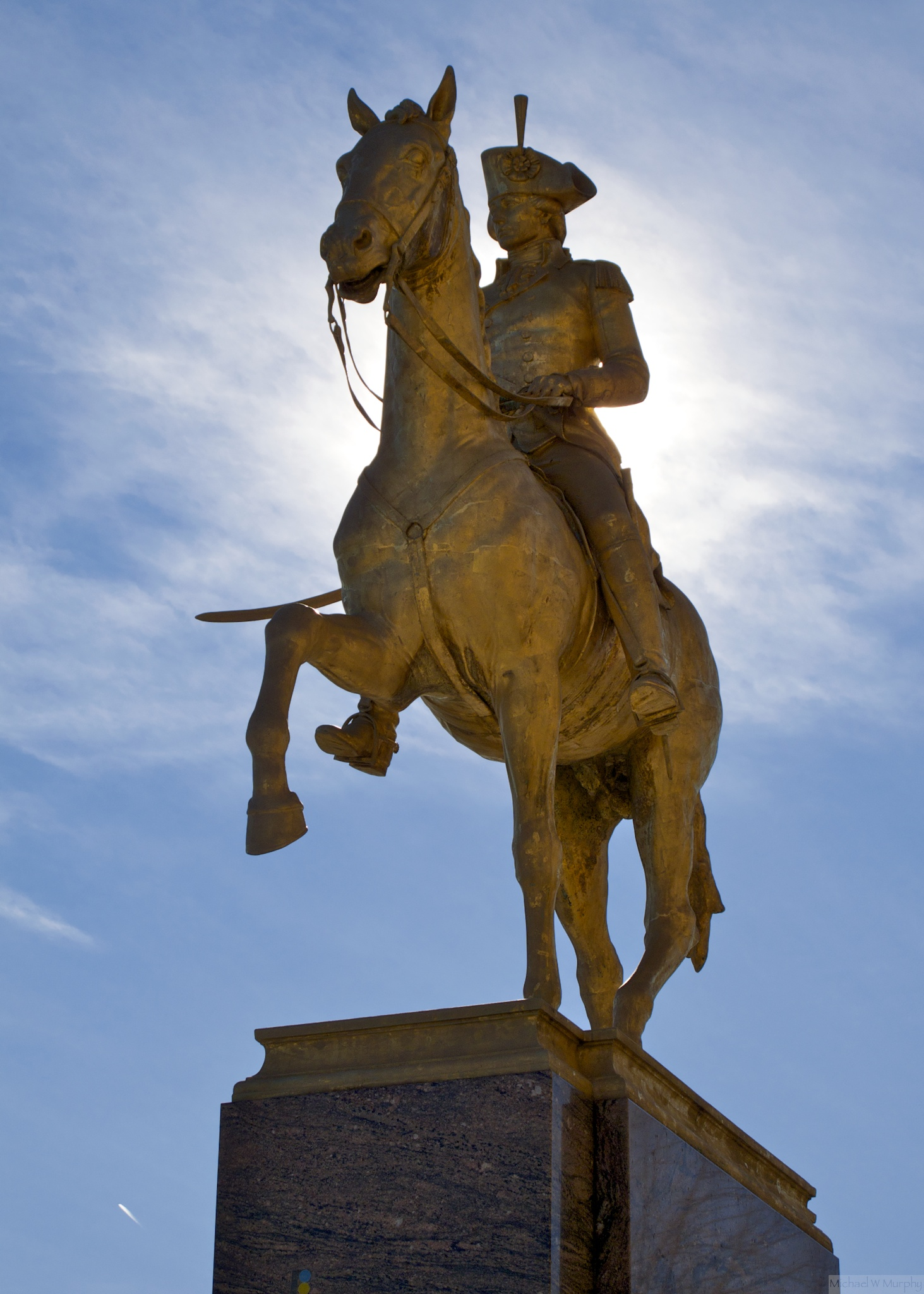
Anthony Wayne (1937), Philadelphia Museum of Art.

John Clements Gregory (May 17, 1879 – 1958) was an American sculptor.

== Life ==
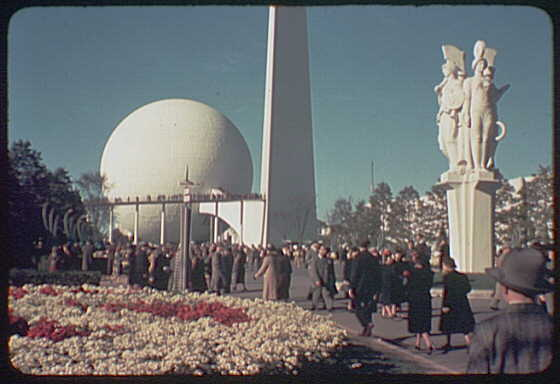
Gregory's Four Victories of Peace (right) at the 1939 New York World's Fair

Gregory was born in London, England. When he was about 12 years old his family immigrated to the United States where he began his sculptural studies at the Art Students League in New York City. He continued these at both the École des Beaux-Arts in Paris and at the American Academy in Rome. At various times he studied with J. Massey Rhind, George Grey Barnard, Hermon MacNeil, Gutzon Borglum, Herbert Adams, and Antonin Mercié. He became a United States citizen in 1912 and during the First World War served in the camouflage section of the U.S. Navy.

He was one of a dozen sculptors invited to compete in the Pioneer Woman statue competition in 1927, which he failed to win. In 1927 he was elected into the National Academy of Design as an Associate member and became a full Academician in 1934.

In 1932 Gregory produced 9 marble bas reliefs for Paul Cret's Folger Shakespeare Library in Washington, D.C. Each panel depicted a scene from a different play by Shakespeare.

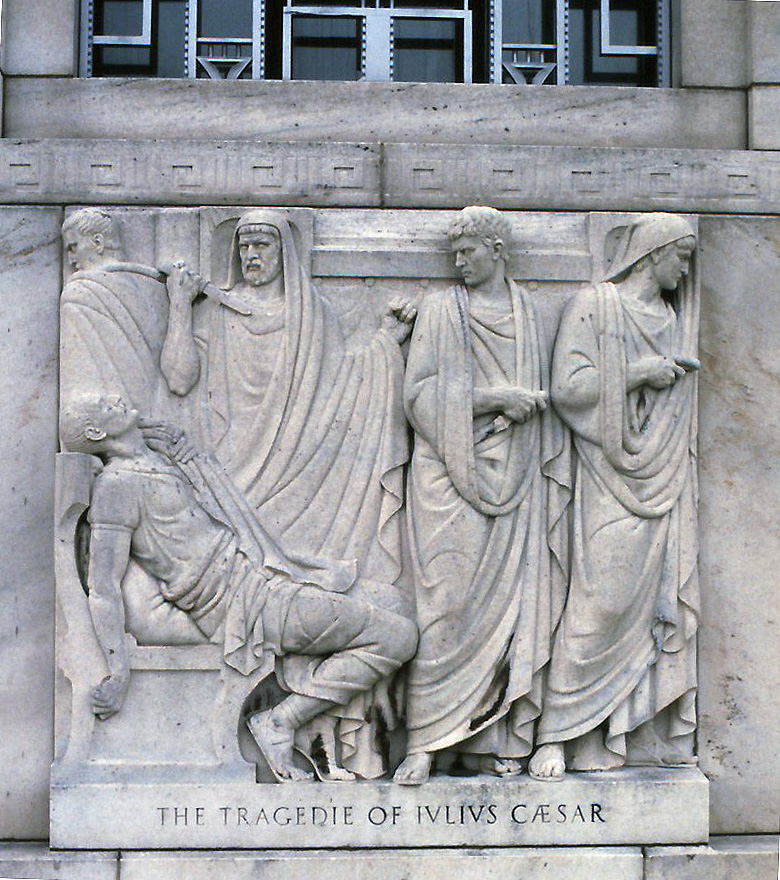
Julius Caesar

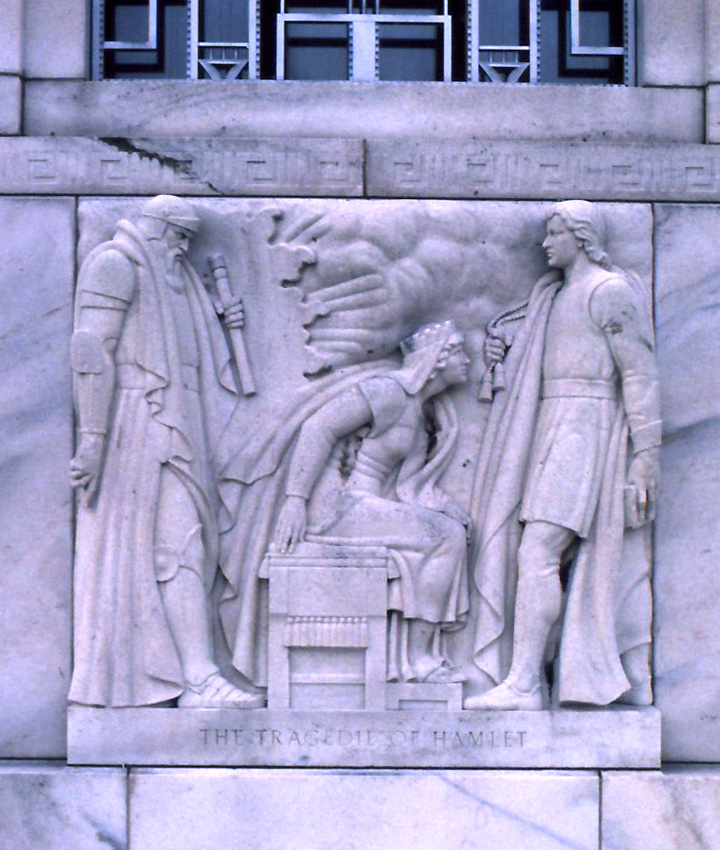
Hamlet

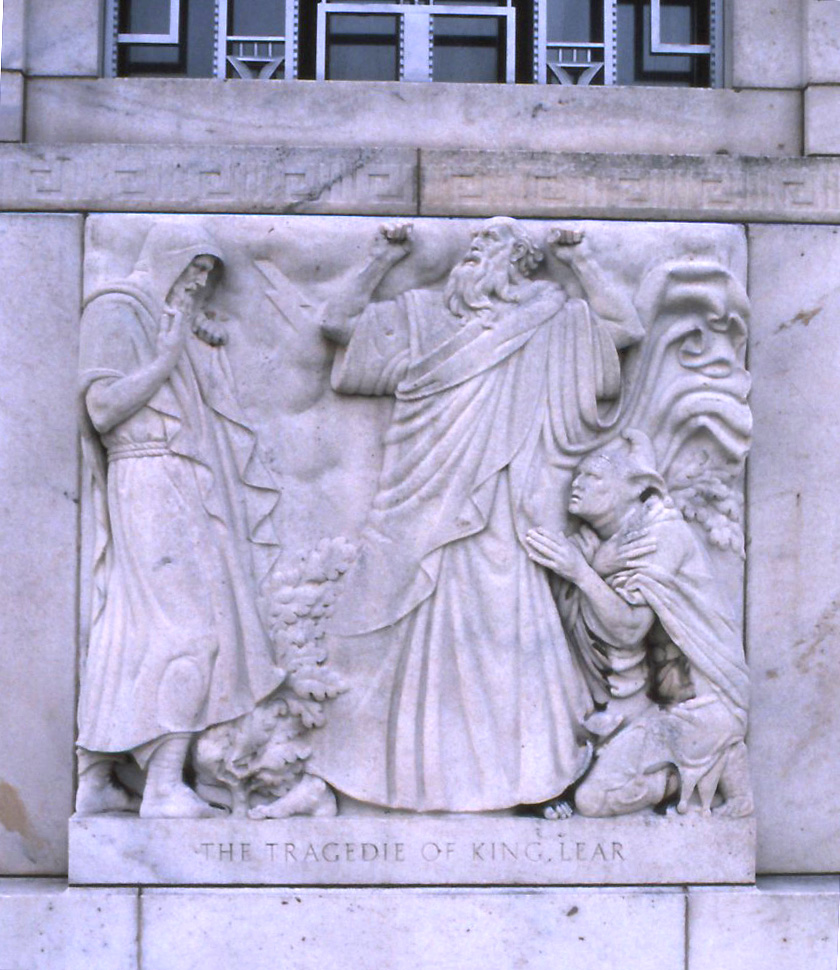
King Lear

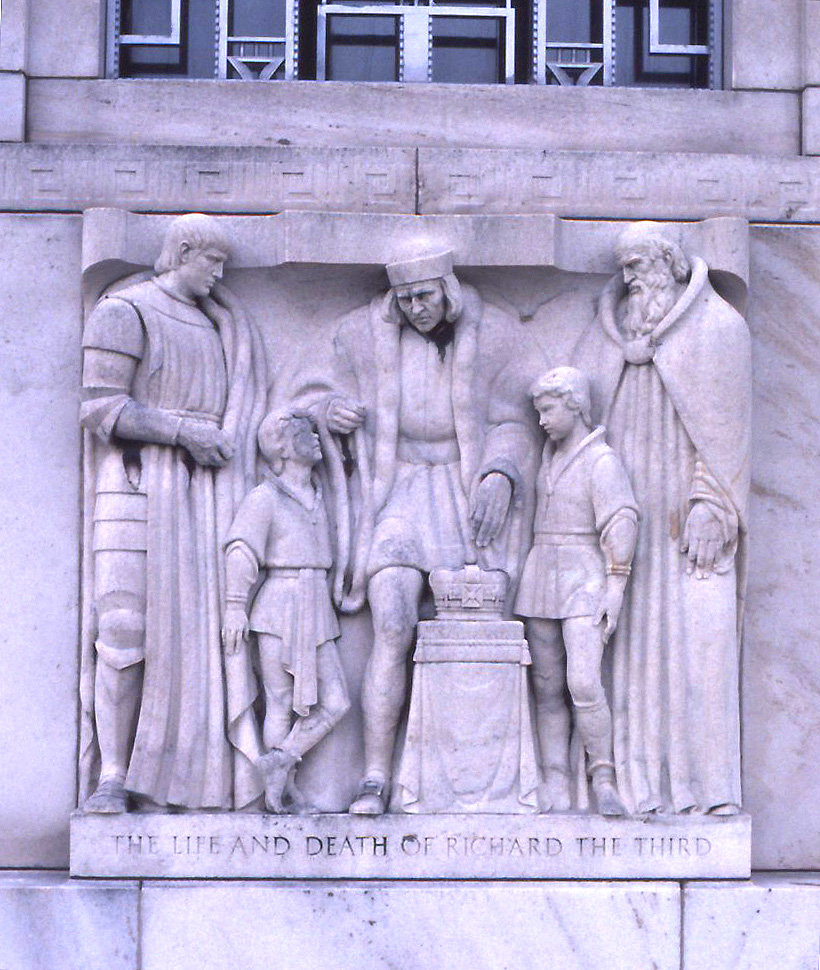
Richard III

In 1937, he completed a gilded bronze equestrian statue of Anthony Wayne for the Philadelphia Museum of Art.

Gregory is well known for his architectural sculpture. Examples include bas relief panels on the structure and sarcophagus of the Huntington Mausoleum by architect John Russell Pope at The Huntington Library in San Marino, California; and the larger-than-life panels, Columbia and Urban Life, on either side of the steps in John Marshall Park, Judiciary Square, Washington, D.C.

Gregory was a member of the National Sculpture Society, the American Federation of Arts, and the Beaux-Arts Institute of Design.
