= Bryant Baker =

British-born American sculptor (1881–1970)

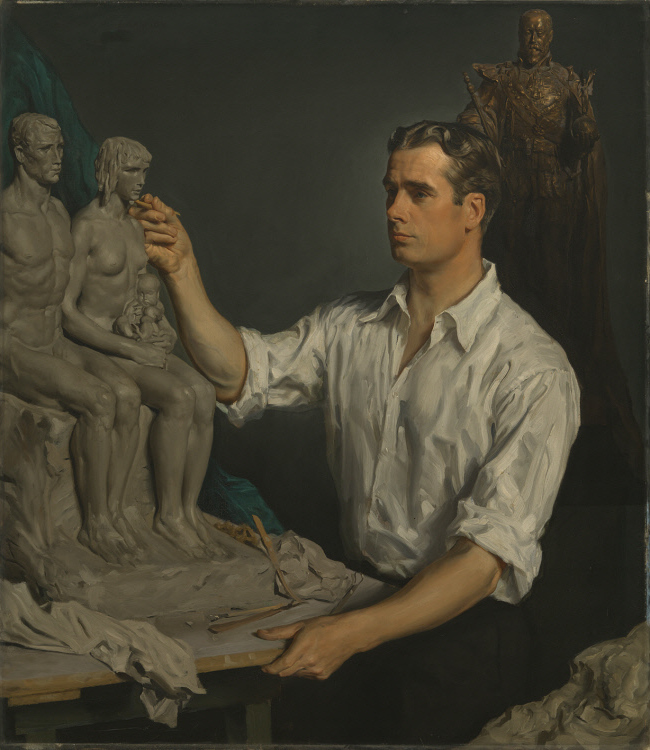
- Portrait by Sidney Edward Dickinson, 1925
- Born: Percy Bryant Baker; July 8, 1881; London, England, U.K.
- Died: March 29, 1970 (aged 88); New York, New York, U.S.
- Education: City and Guild Technical Institute; Royal Academy of Arts
- Known for: Sculpture
- Notable work: Pioneer Woman; L'Apres-Midi d'un Faune; George Washington, Mason

Percy Bryant Baker (July 8, 1881 – March 29, 1970) better known as Bryant Baker, was a British-born American sculptor. He sculpted a number of busts of famous Americans (including five presidents). In 1910, Queen Alexandra of the United Kingdom commissioned him to create a bust of King Edward VII.

== Life and career ==
Baker was born on July 8, 1881, in London, United Kingdom, to John Baker, a sculptor. His father and his sculptor grandfather both worked on wood and stone carvings at Westminster Abbey. His brother was Robert P. Baker, also a sculptor of note. He became an apprentice sculptor under his father, and carved Gothic statues for Beverley Minster and decorative elements for the Victoria and Albert Museum. He studied art and sculpting at the City and Guild Technical Institute and later at the Royal Academy of Arts. He graduated from the latter in 1910.

In 1910, Queen Alexandra commissioned him to sculpt a bust of Edward VII. She was so impressed with his work, that she then commissioned him to design a life-size statue of Edward VII, and later a bust in marble of the nine-year-old Prince Olaf of Norway.

In 1916, Baker emigrated to the United States, where he enlisted in the United States Army. He served during World War I in Army hospitals, crafting artificial limbs and face masks for wounded soldiers. He created a bust of John J. Pershing in 1921 and a bust of Arthur Weimar Thompson, both for the Nebraska Hall of Fame. He became a U.S. citizen in 1923.

In 1928, millionaire Oklahoma oilman E. W. Marland sponsored a $100,000 competition to create a statue honoring pioneering women of the American Old West. Baker won the design competition, and in 1930 his 27-foot (8.2 m) high, 12,000 pounds (5,400 kg) statue, Pioneer Woman, was unveiled in Ponca City, Oklahoma. It became his best-known work. In 1957, Baker was elected into the National Academy of Design as an Associate member, and became a full member in 1959.

Baker never married. In his final years, Baker lived in The Gainsborough high-rise apartment building at 222 West 59th Street in New York City. He died of unspecified causes at St. Barnabas Hospital in The Bronx on March 29, 1970. He was cremated, and his ashes interred at St. Peter's Church in Fordcombe, Kent, England.

Shortly after his death, the contents of his New York studio were purchased and moved to the E. W. Marland Mansion in Ponca City. The mansion is now known as the Ponca City Cultural Center, and Baker's studio and copies of many of his works are on display there.

Baker was a Freemason, and belonged to the Constitutional Lodge No. 294 at Beverley, Yorkshire, England.

== Notable works ==
- Pioneer Woman, 1930, Ponca City, Oklahoma, 27 feet (8.2 m) tall
- Portrait plaque of Stephen Tyng Mather, 1930, with castings in dozens of U.S. National Park Service areas
- Grover Cleveland, 1932, Buffalo, New York, monumental sized
- Millard Fillmore, 1932, Buffalo, New York, monumental sized
- L'Apres-Midi d'un Faune, 1934, Brookgreen Gardens, Murrells Inlet, South Carolina
- John M. Clayton, 1934, National Statuary Hall Collection, Washington D.C. (for Delaware)
- Caesar Rodney, 1934, National Statuary Hall Collection, Washington D.C. (for Delaware)
- Abraham Lincoln Statue, 1935, Delaware Park, Buffalo, New York
- Bust of Cordell Hull, 1943, OAS Aztec Garden, Washington, D.C. (see also: List of public art in Ward 2)
- William Borah, 1947, National Statuary Hall Collection, Washington D.C. (for Idaho)
- Illustrious Brother George Washington, 1949, George Washington Masonic National Memorial, Alexandria, Virginia
- William C. Gorgas, 1954, Mobile County Health Department, Mobile, AL
- Charles Penrose, 1956, formerly in the Newcomen Society of the United States
- Bust of Sir Winston Churchill, 1958, National Portrait Gallery, Smithsonian Institution
- Bust of Herbert Hoover - Université libre de Bruxelles - Archives, patrimoine, réserve précieuse

According to the Smithsonian Institution, several copies of Baker's works can be found at the Ponca City Cultural Center in Ponca City, Oklahoma.

=== Gallery ===
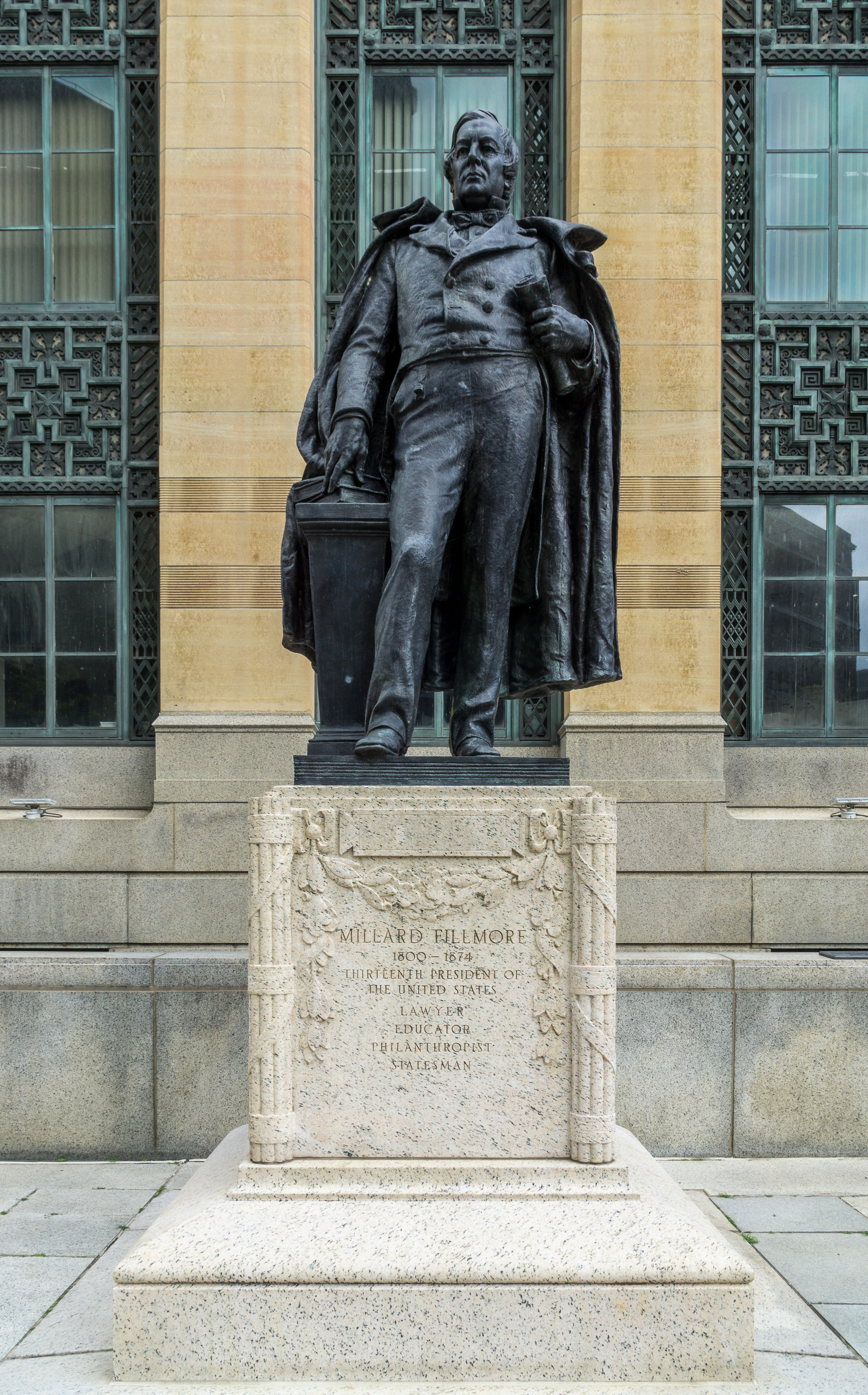
Millard Fillmore, Buffalo City Hall, Buffalo, New York, 1930

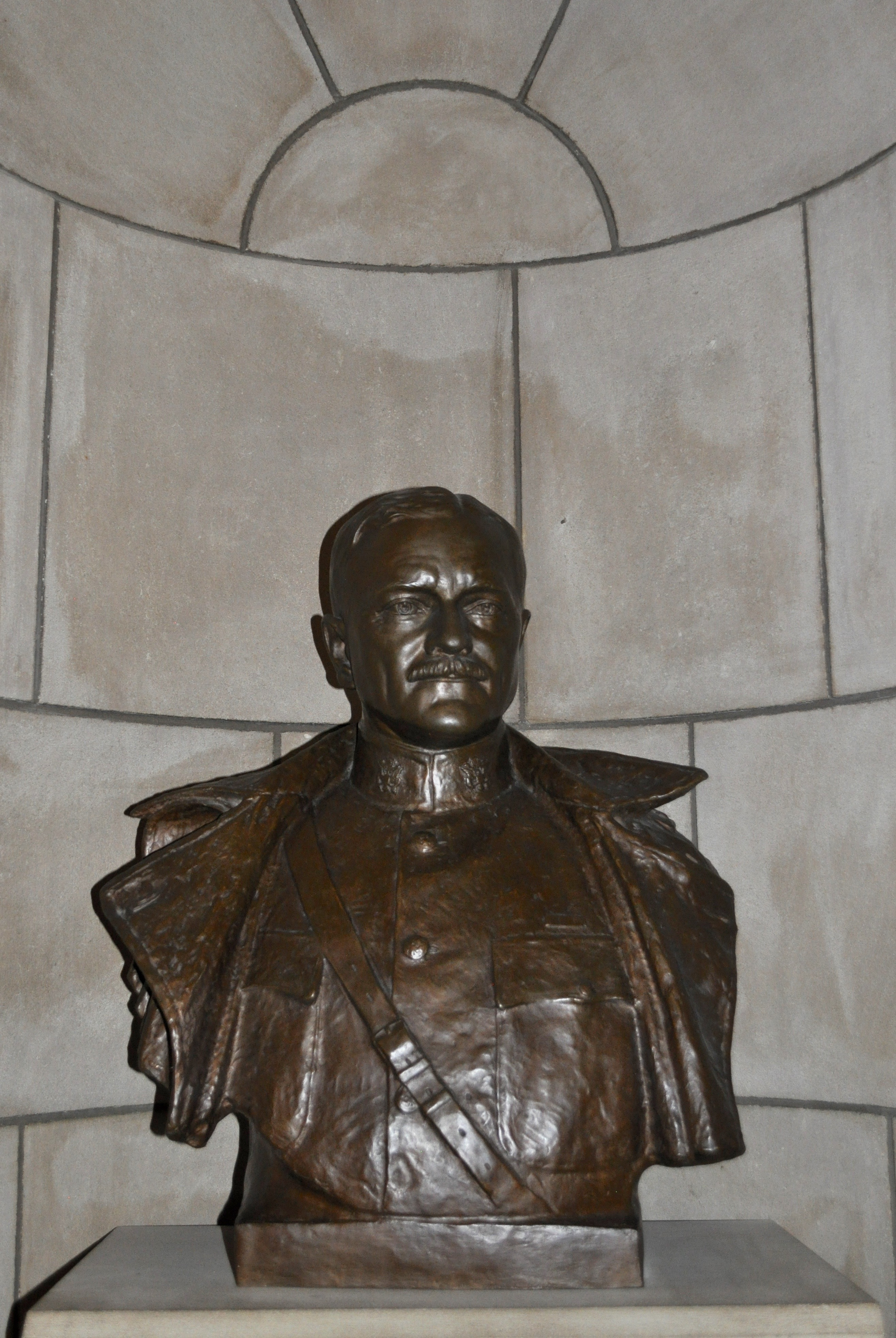
John J. Pershing, in the Nebraska Hall of Fame

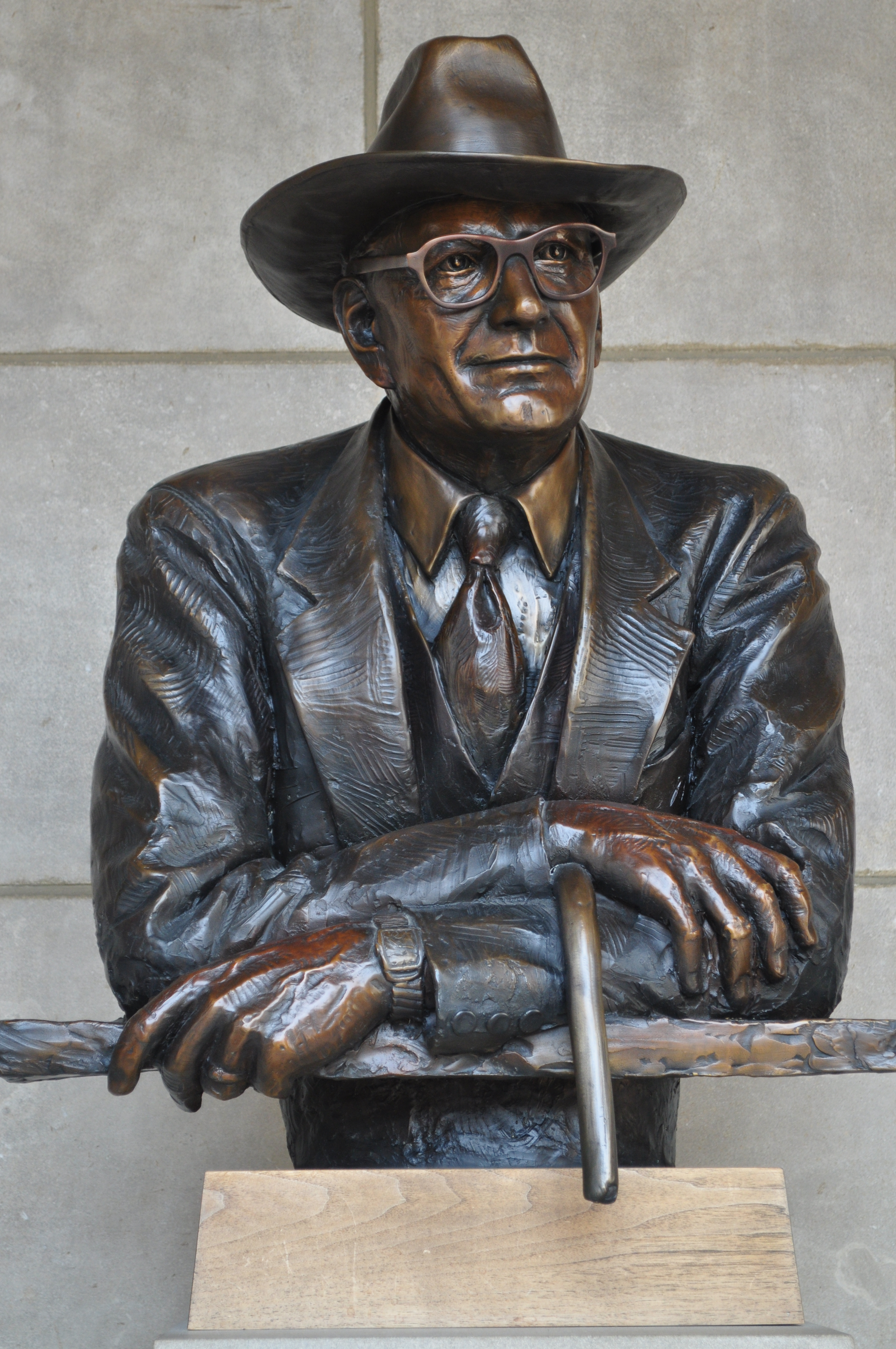
Arthur Weimar Thompson, in the Nebraska Hall of Fame

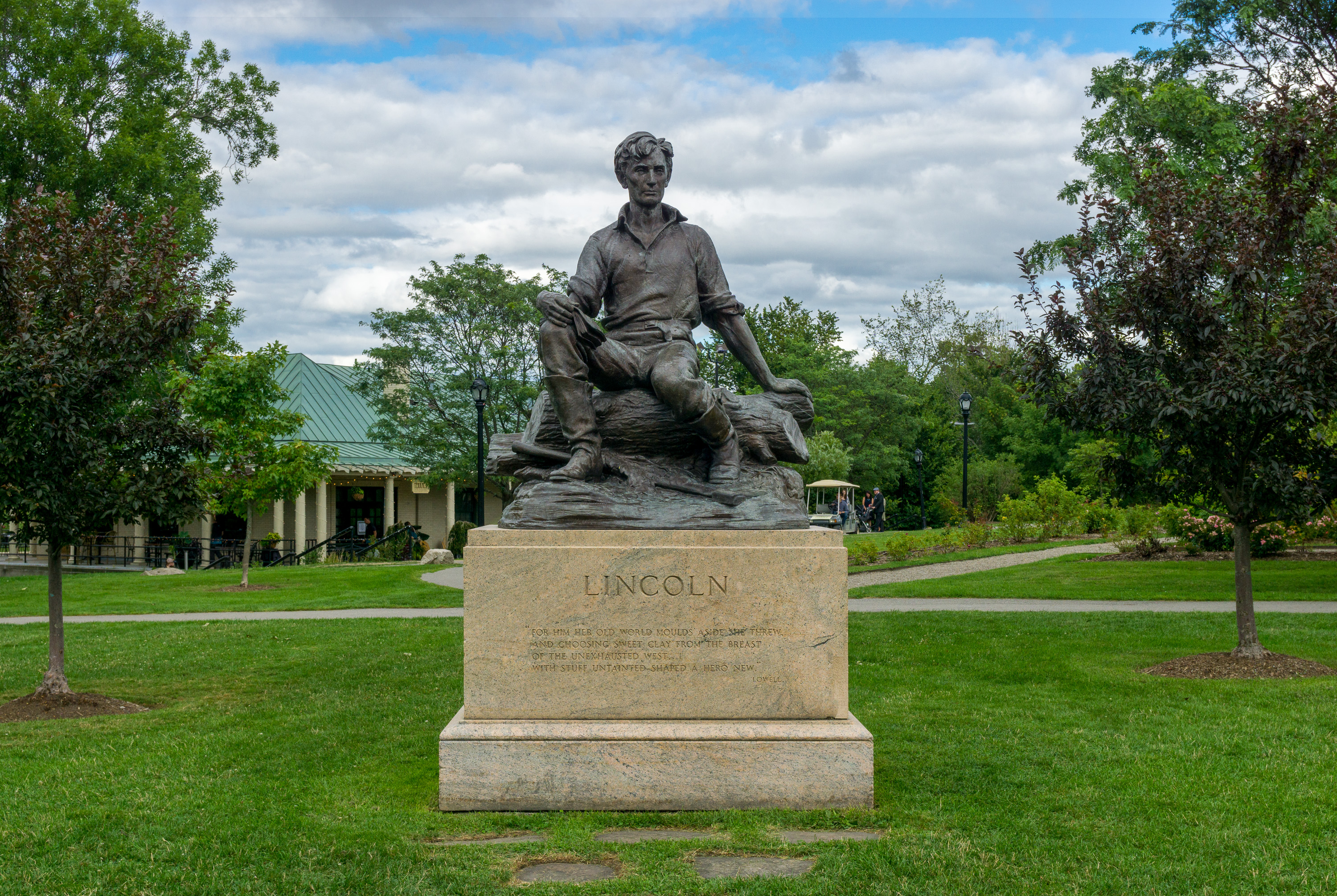
Abraham Lincoln, Delaware Park, Buffalo, New York, 1935

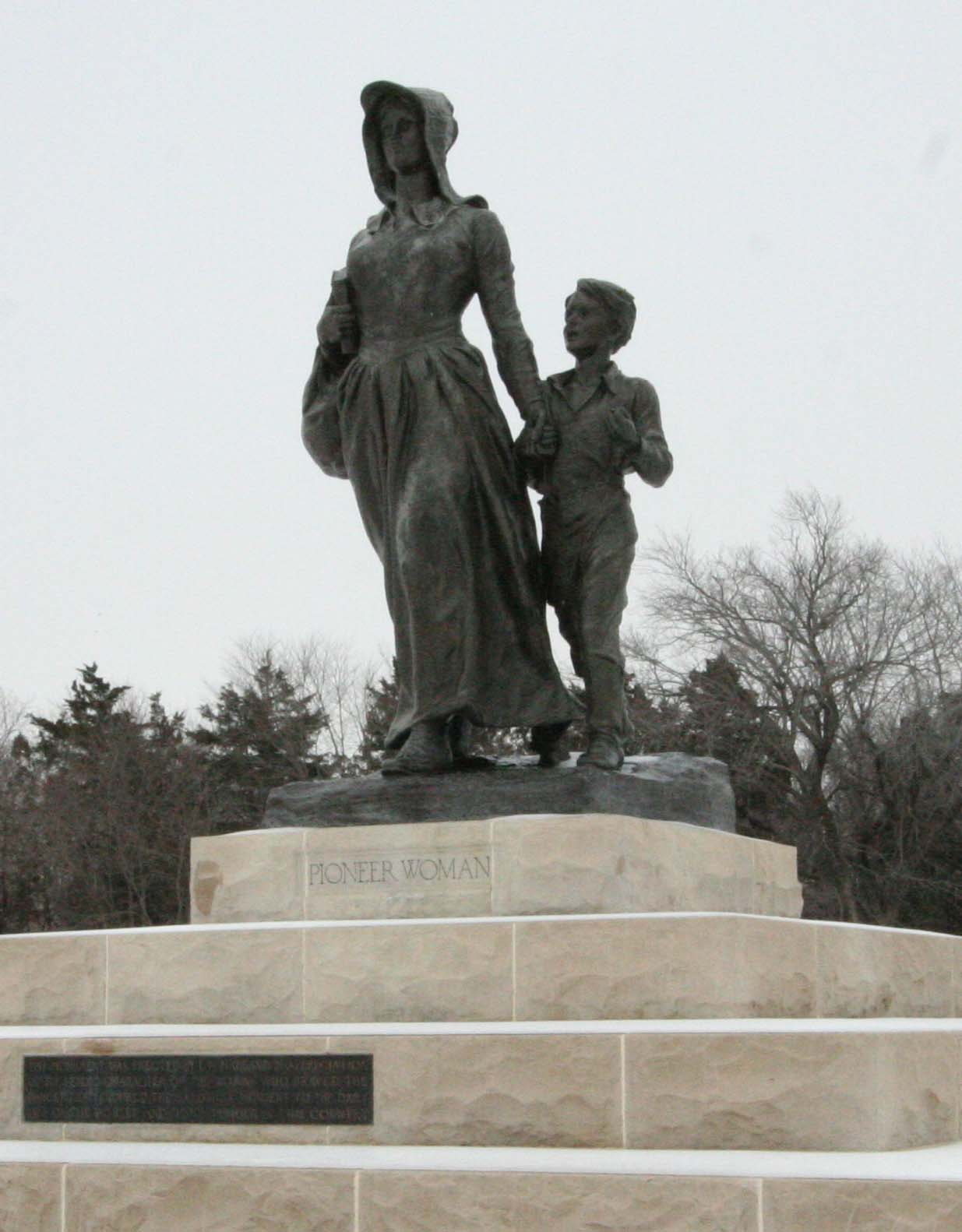
Pioneer Woman, Ponca City, Oklahoma

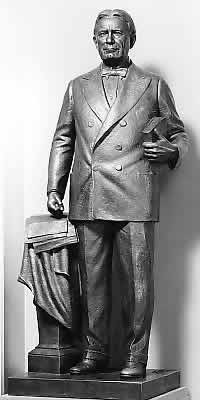
William Borah, Washington, D.C., 1947

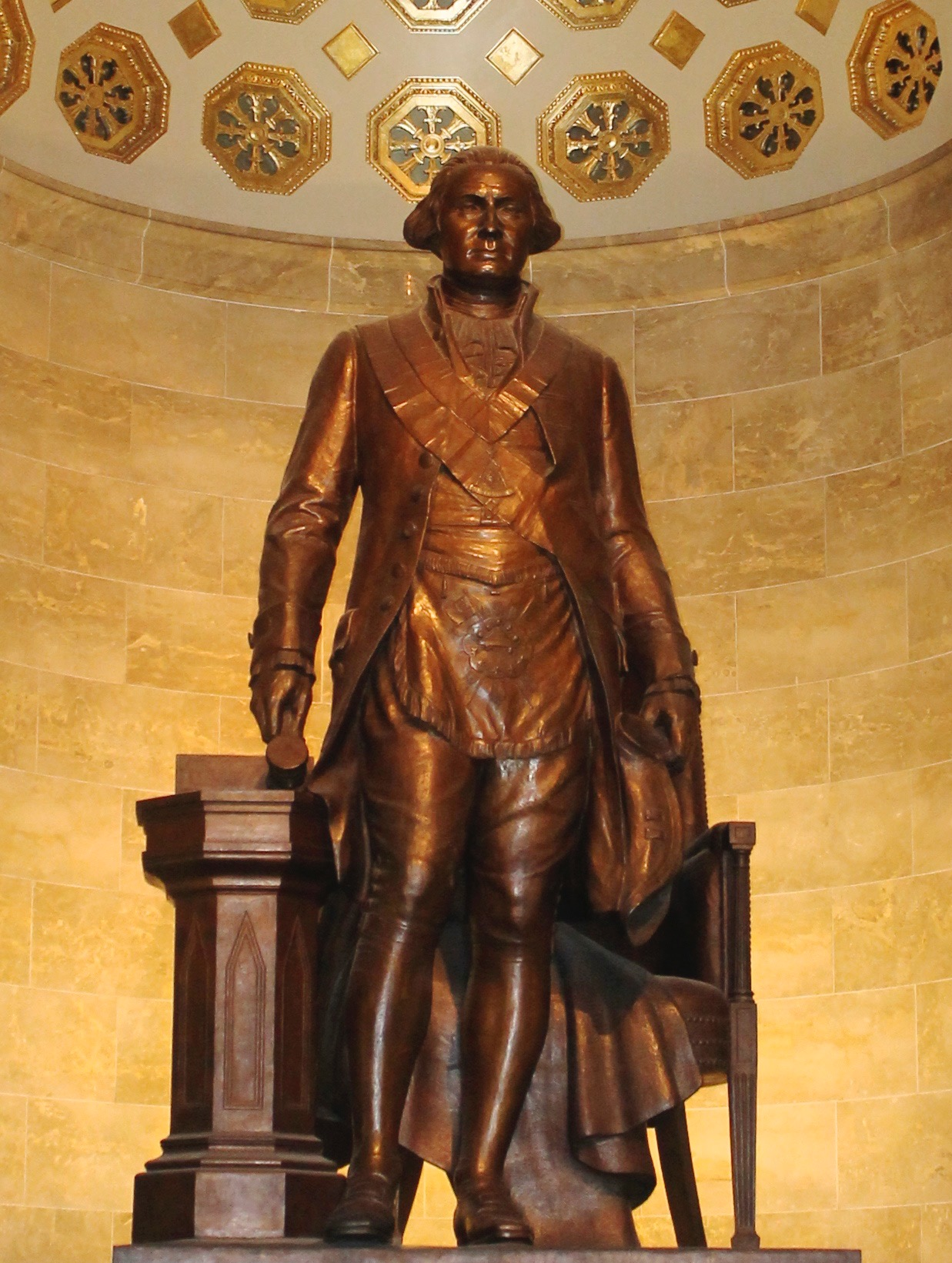
Illustrious Brother George Washington, Alexandria, Virginia, 1949

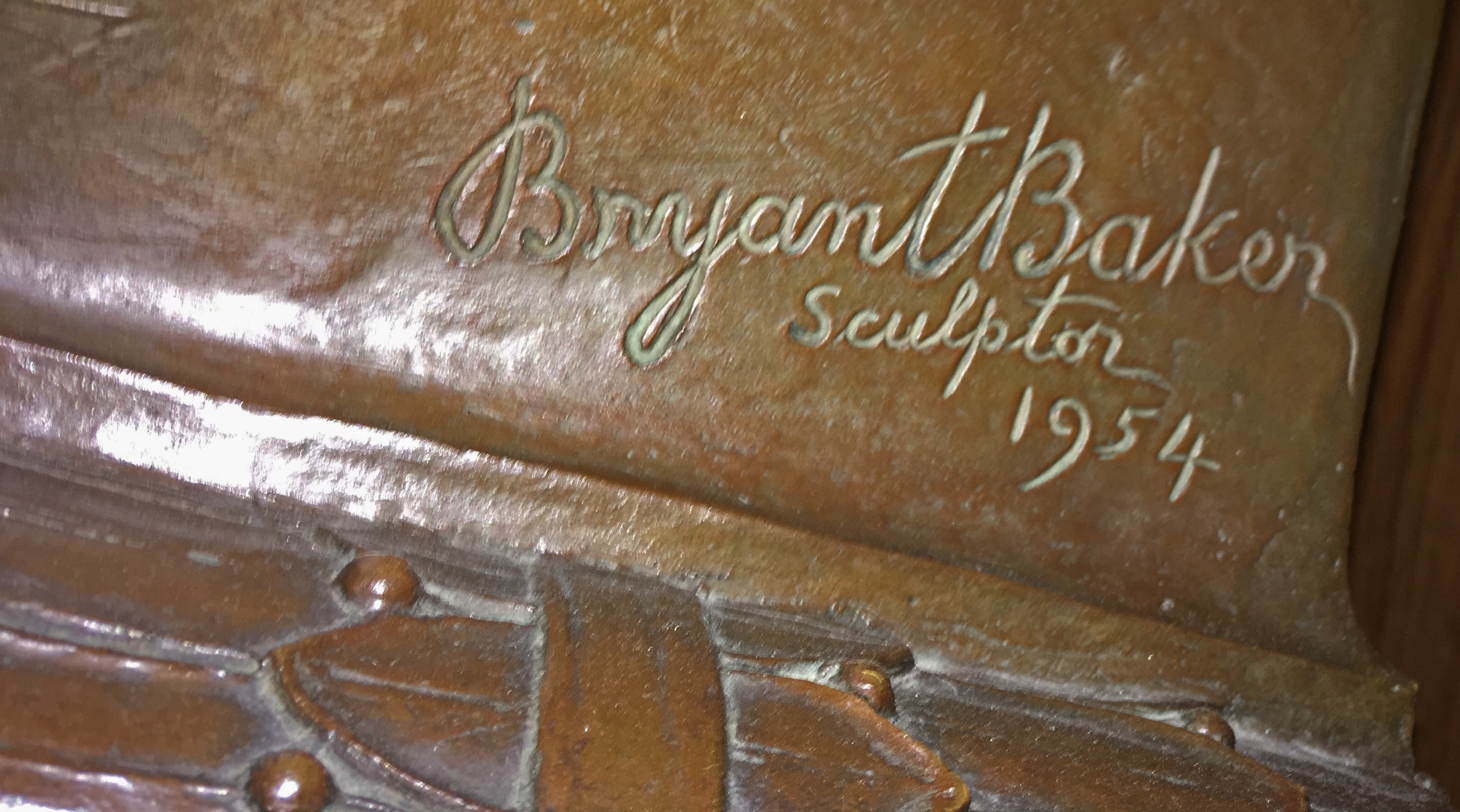
Artist's Signature, 1954

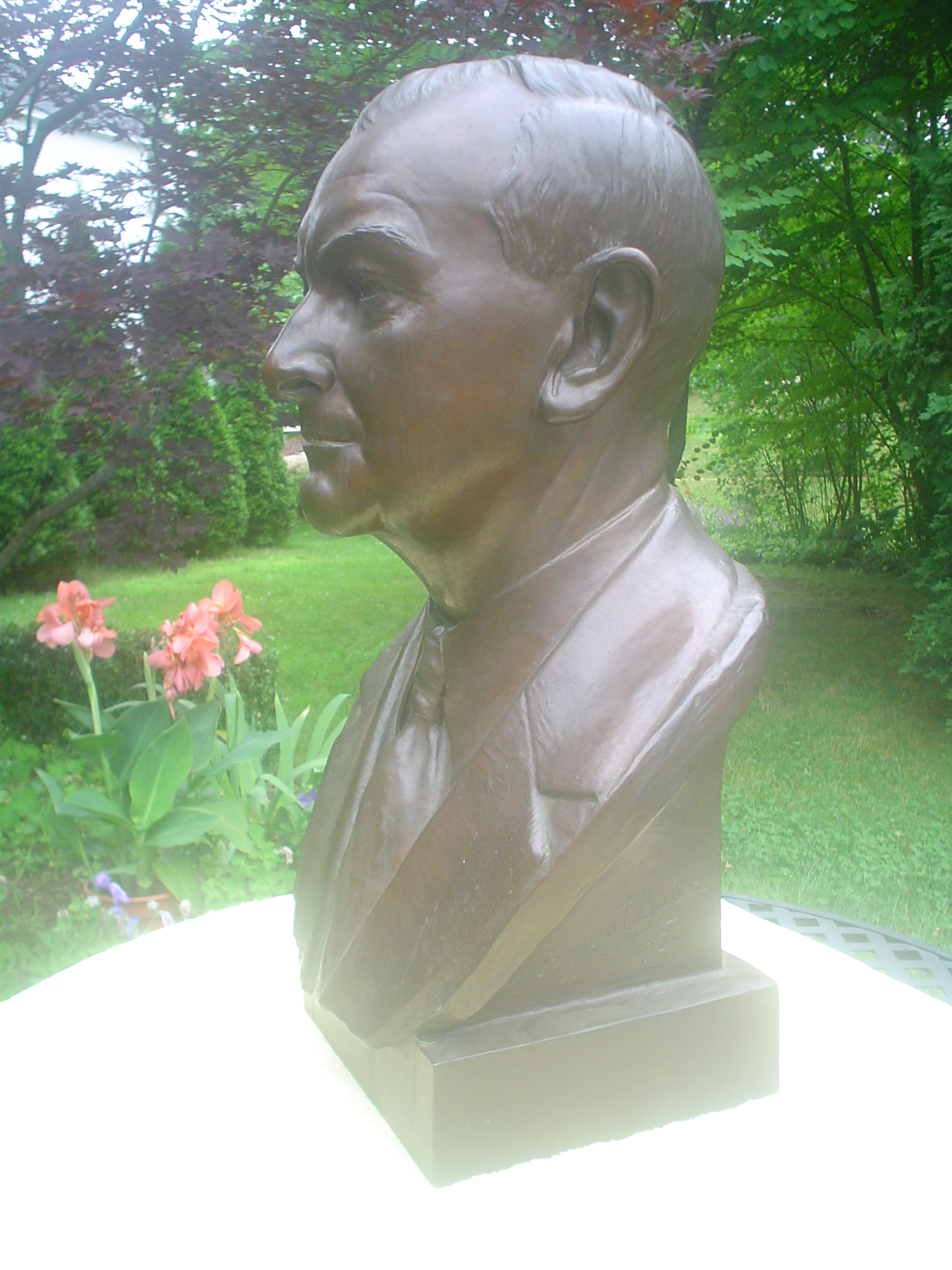
Charles Penrose, 1956

== Bibliography ==
- Brown, William Adrian (1980). History of the George Washington Masonic National Memorial, 1922-1974: Half Century of Construction. Washington, D.C.: George Washington Masonic National Memorial Association.
- Denslow, William R. (1957). 10,000 Famous Freemasons. Trenton, Mo.: Missouri Lodge of Research.
- Gay, Vernon; Evert, Marilyn (1983). Discovering Pittsburgh's Sculpture. Pittsburgh, Pa.: University of Pittsburgh Press. ISBN 9780822934677.
- National Sculpture Society (1929). Contemporary American Sculpture: The California Palace of the Legion of Honor, Lincoln Park, San Francisco. New York: Press of the Kalkhoff Company.
- Proske, Beatrice Gilman (1968). Brookgreen Gardens Sculpture. Murrells Inlet, S.C.: Brookgreen Gardens.
