= Marland Grand Home =

Historic house in Oklahoma, United States

Marland's Grand Home
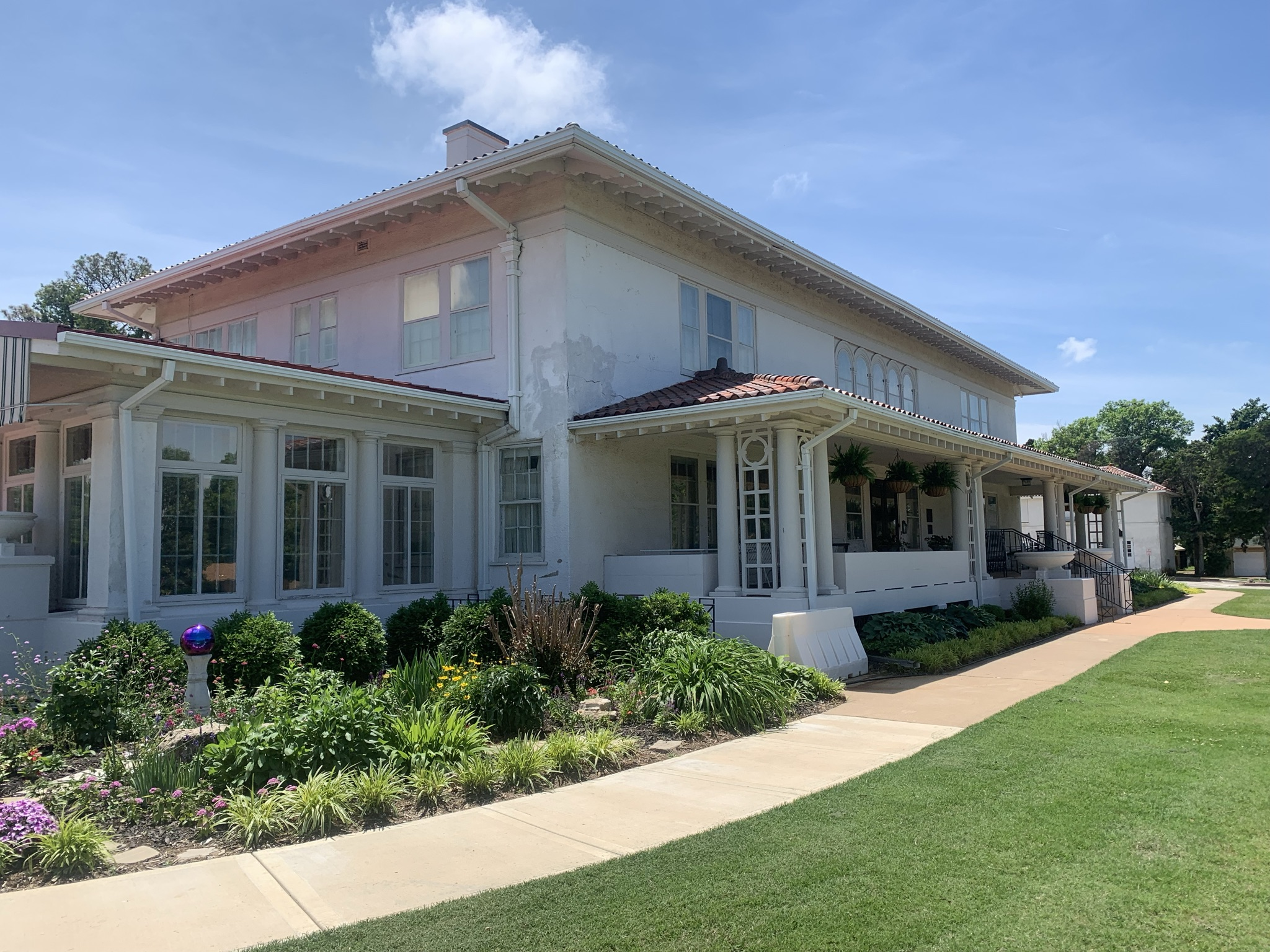
- Marland Grand Home, south entrance, former residence of E. W. (Ernest Whitworth) Marland (1874-1941) and family, 1914-1941 on Grand Avenue in Ponca City, (Kay County), Oklahoma, designed by Solomon Layton (1864-1943)
- Established: 1914
- Location: Ponca City, Oklahoma (Kay County)
- Coordinates: 36°42′45″N 97°4′21″W
- Type: Museum
- Founder: E. W. (Ernest Whitworth) Marland (1874-1941)
- Architects: Solomon Layton (1864-1943)
- Owner: City of Ponca City
- Website: https://www.marlandgrandhome.com/

The Marland Grand Home (also known as Marland's Grand Home, the Grand Home, and the Marland-Paris Home) is the first home built by Pennsylvania and Oklahoma oilman, businessman and politician E. W. (Ernest Whitworth) Marland (1874-1941), in Ponca City, (Kay County), Oklahoma and is considered a landmark in the community.

The Grand Home was given its name because the home is on Grand Avenue in Ponca City, the community where Marland lived with his first and second wives and adopted children for 33 years from 1908 until his death in 1941 and the town where he founded his Marland Oil Company (which later merged with Continental Oil Company and later became known as Conoco) and also where he built his Ponca City oil refinery, which is still in operation today more than 100 years later.

Marland's Grand Home is a 1910s period mansion built in the luxurious Italian Renaissance Revival architecture style. It was designed by architect Solomon Layton (1864-1943) and built in 1914, just before the First World War (1914/1917-1918). The Grand Home is owned today by the City of Ponca City and includes exhibit rooms for Miller Brothers 101 Ranch history, Native American archaeology, artifacts and art, and Daughters of the American Revolution exhibits. The Grand Home was also formerly known as the Ponca City Cultural Center Museum.

== History and description ==
After Marland hit his first oil well in 1911, Marland and his wife Virginia moved from the Arcade Hotel in Ponca City to a home on North 6th Street while Marland had his Grand Home built. Designed by architect Solomon Layton, construction of the Grand Home began in 1914 and was completed in 1916. Marland lived in the home until 1928 when he moved onto the huge estate he had built on 640 acres outside of Ponca City, the Marland Mansion. During this era E.W.'s net worth, not including his oil company, exceeded 100 million dollars, over a billion in today's standards.

The first floor of the Grand Home is decorated with period furnishings, art, china and silver services and family photos that evoke the Marland era. The Grand Home featured a central vacuuming system, an automatic dishwasher, and an indoor swimming pool, all considered fabulous luxuries at the time. Later when Marland's wife Virginia became ill with cancer in 1919, Marland had a Frigidaire indoor central air-conditioning installed in the Grand Home. The massive unit cooled only one room to keep Virginia Marland comfortable before she died from pneumonia on June 7, 1926. The Grand Home also featured an attached three-car garage along with an additional three-bay carriage house.

According to the application with the National Park Service for the Grand Home to be designated a historic landmark:

The mansion sets (sic) at the summit of quite a rise of ground while gradually sloping away are a series of terraced gardens ending with the greenhouse at the foot, there being six acres in this garden surrounded with a line of tall growing trees resembling poplars. This is an enchanted spot with its rose gardens, pond lily basins, where all the familiar flowers of the north vie with the lovely varieties of the semi-tropics running a perfect riot.

The one-time home of Oklahoma's 12th governor is more than a magnificent mansion ordered into existence by a millionaire oilman. It is a majestic monument in stone to one of the last of a "breed" - a fantastically successful wildcatter, a rags-to-riches individualist, an ambitious empire who created on the frontier a classic European villa where but a few decades earlier there had been only tepees.

It was in 1914, just three years after his initial strike, that he first decided to build for himself a home more worthy of his increasing wealth and growing importance in the petroleum industry. This 22-room white stucco mansion at the east end of Ponca City's main street, Grand Avenue, is the result. It was completed in time for Christmas 1916. And for the next twelve years it was the scene of elaborate parties and increasingly important gatherings of social, political, entertainment world, and business figures from around Oklahoma and the country. Marland introduced fox hunting to the area and soon the white mansion was hosting redcoated hunters to traditionally sumptuous hunt breakfasts. Parties were held after polo matches and horse shows.

Marland particularly enjoyed the indoor swimming pool in the Grand Home, the first indoor pool in Oklahoma. Even though his younger lieutenants (as he called his upper management employees) could beat him on the athletic field, Marland said he could outlast them in the pool.

The Grand Home cost approximately $350,000 to build, equivalent to about $3.5 million in 2021 dollars. The Grand Home, at 16,500 square feet, included 22-rooms and was created in the Italian Renaissance Revival style.

== Gardens ==
The gardens that Marland had planted around the home were a big part of the Grand Home. Marland had a great love of English and French gardens so with the help of a Japanese gardener, Marland planned for four square blocks of lovely formal gardens at his new residence which would stretch eastward from the home to what is now known as 14th Street/HW 177. To the east of the Grand Home, Marland had acres of gardens designed and constructed to evoke the Gardens of Versailles. The gardens were overseen by Henry C. Hatashita who was approached by E.W. Marland's attorney in 1918 about a job in Ponca City. Hatashita would remain in the city, working for Marland until 1939. He left behind a living legacy in the Ponca City landscape and is locally considered a "horticultural wizard".

According to the Application to the U.S. National Park Service to become a historic landmark:

Before Hatashita's arrival, Marland's estate was described as "treeless, and barren". E.W. Marland possessed a grand vision of creating a formal garden to "equal or surpass the English tradition". To create Marland's vision, Hatashita designed and built formal and informal gardens, using elaborate shapes and patterns and a great variety of plants from around the country. He developed a hardy variety of English boxwood for hedges that could thrive in the Ponca City heat, boxwood used to mimic the gardens at Versailles. Beginning with the groundsaround Marland's Grand House along Grand Avenue, Hatashita eventually oversaw hundreds of acres of fully landscaped land including the grounds of the Marland Mansion completed in 1928, a seventy (70) acre golf course and a ten (10) acre formal garden, all part of the Marland estate. Beyond overseeing Marland's private gardens, Hatashita was responsible for overseeing thelandscaping of the grounds of Marland's corporate offices and for landscaping at all of the Marland filling stations. In order to make Marland's vision a reality, Hatashita oversaw a crew of up to as many as seventy-five (75) men and maintained a fifty (50) acre plant and treenursery.

Across the street from the Grand Home Marland built a 9-hole golf course for his employees and the public to play free of charge.

== After Marland ==
=== Sale to Moran ===
After Marland lost control of his oil company to J. P. Morgan bankers in 1928, the new president of Marland Oil Company, Dan Moran, lived in the Grand Home with his wife, Carolyn, and six children. Marland had been forced to hand over the Grand Home, which belonged to the Marland Oil Company, to the new owner of what was now called Continental Oil Company (CONOCO). Moran purchased the Grand Home in 1930 and lived in it until 1940. The sale included the home, carriage house, and two lilyponds with a large yard area. The Marland Gardens to the east were not a part of the transaction. Mrs. Moran continued to host the popular Ponca City Music Club in the home as Mrs. Marland had done the decade before.

=== Sale to Paris family ===
In 1940 the Marland's Grand Home was sold to Jay Paris, owner of the Paris Furniture Store of Ponca City. After the Paris family moved into the home they added many fine furnishings, particularly several antique pieces which they had acquired through their furniture store. They added a European Chippendale-styled dining room furniture collection, still at the home today. It fills in the formal dining space. The present office area of the home was used as an informal dining and breakfast space. At the time there had been no bathroom on the 1st floor, so one was added utilizing space taken out of a next door powder room which held only a fainting couch and laundry chute.

== City of Ponca City purchase and renovation ==
=== Purchase and renovation ===
Jay Paris died in 1963 at an early age and his widow Jessie lived in the Grand Home for several more years. In 1967, through a sales tax vote, the City of Ponca City purchased the property for $85,000 with the intent of creating a special events and meeting center. The city moved their collection of Indian artefacts, Marland family and Marland Oil memorabilia, and a 101 Ranch memorabilia to the Grand Home. When Jessie Paris moved out, the Paris' ornate music box, nostalgic rattan furniture, a hand-carved desk, Chippendale dining room suit, two crystal chandeliers and several mahogany tables were purchased by the City of Ponca City and remained in the home.

Ponca City's Indian Museum, established in 1936 and concentrating on material relating to the five tribes of the area - Ponca, Kaw, Otoe, Osage, and Tonkawa - was moved into the Grand Home. Ethnological and archaeological materials of other tribes have since been added. The house also contains the studio of Bryant Baker, the New York artist who sculpted the famed Pioneer Woman Monument. The 101 Ranch Room was added with memorabilia pertaining to that famed institution and the D. A. R. added a Memorial Museum patterned after the one in Washington, D. C. The Grand Home began to serve as a City Garden Center and annually hosted countless parties, receptions, and other social events, as well as art shows, music club programs, and meetings of numerous civic groups.

With the purchase of Marland's Grand Home by the city of Ponca City, renovators began to restore the home to what it looked like in Marland's time. "Shag carpeting was removed to expose the original wooden floors. Modern drapes and inappropriate window shades were removed, and a fresh coat of paint was applied to the woodwork. The unique hanging stairway steps were restored, and spindles were painted as well. Furnishings and accessories for the first floor, which was used mainly for meeting and event space, were chosen that would lend themselves to various uses. And for heat, a new boiler system replaced the old; and for air, a new energy efficient HVAC was installed."

In 1976 the Marland's Grand Home was placed on the National Register of Historic Places. The designation selection was based on architectural, industrial and social history significance and brought historical recognition to the Grand Home.

=== Renaming ===
On May 22, 2000, the City Commission changed the name of the Cultural Center to "Marland's Grand Home". The purpose of the renaming was to better market the Grand Home as a tourist attraction, give reference to E.W. Marland, reflect the Grand Home's location on Grand Avenue, and avoid confusion with E.W.'s second home, the Marland Mansion and Estate. In addition, the Friends of the Cultural Center changed their name to "Friends of Marland's Grand Home".

=== Deterioration ===
The Grand Home has experienced deterioration in recent years. According to Jane Detten, Executive Director of the Marland's Grand Home, the Grand Home is experiencing a decline in terms of its structure. "I see significant damage happening in many areas daily," said Detten in 2018. "One of our greatest concerns involves the pool area, which is the public's favorite location in the home. The 100-year-old below-grade walls and tile work are failing due to water infiltration. We are in desperate need of waterproofing and repairing the exterior portion of the walls to prevent the groundwater from coming in. The interior walls are crumbling due to the infiltration and also need repair and reconstruction. The damage must be halted and corrected in the next few years or we may lose the pool space entirely."

To restore and save the Grand Home, the "Friends of the Grand Home", was formed in 1997 to assist the city with the costs of maintenance and restoration. "They have helped with interior decorating, refinishing the wooden floors, purchasing vintage furnishings, remodeled the kitchen, replaced the heat and air system, restoration and framing of the Hunt painting and purchasing display cases to name a few," says FGH board member Donna Trewitt.

== In the media ==
The Native American Collection at the Marland's Grand Home in Ponca City was featured on 'Discover Oklahoma' on KFOR-TV channel 4 in 2015.

== Gallery ==
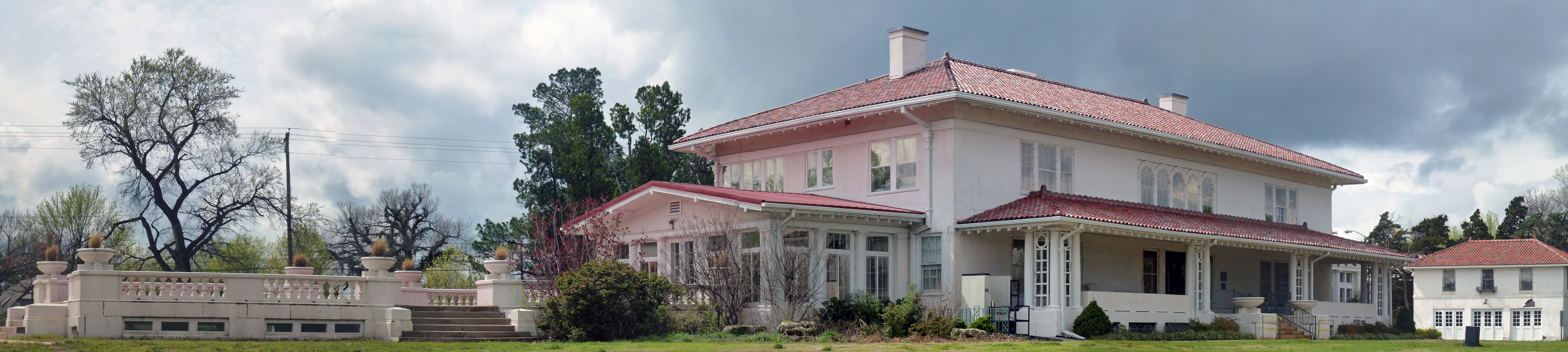
Marland Grand Home Exterior Panorama

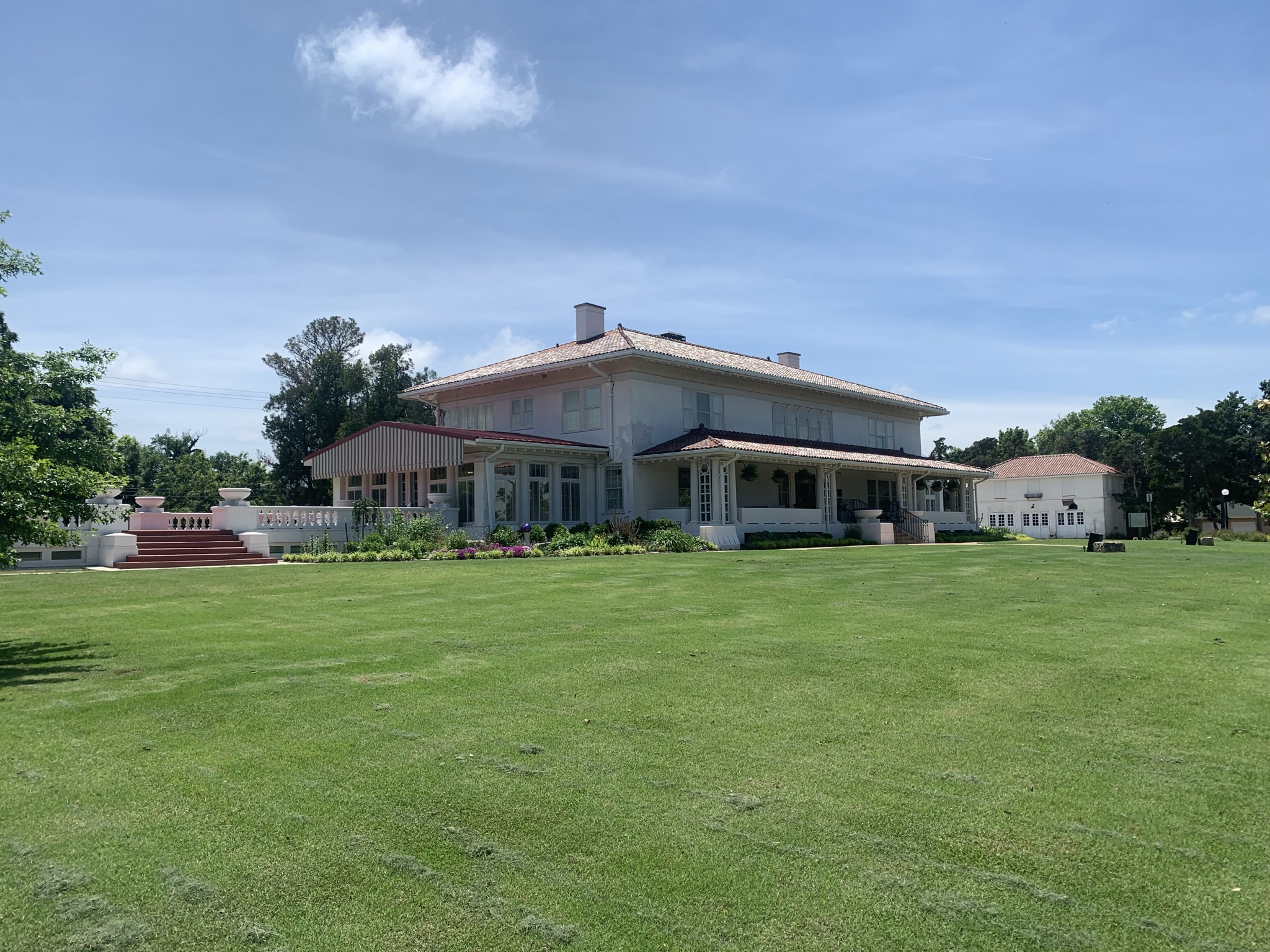
Marland Grand HomMarland's Grand Home from Northeast Lawne from Northeast Lawn

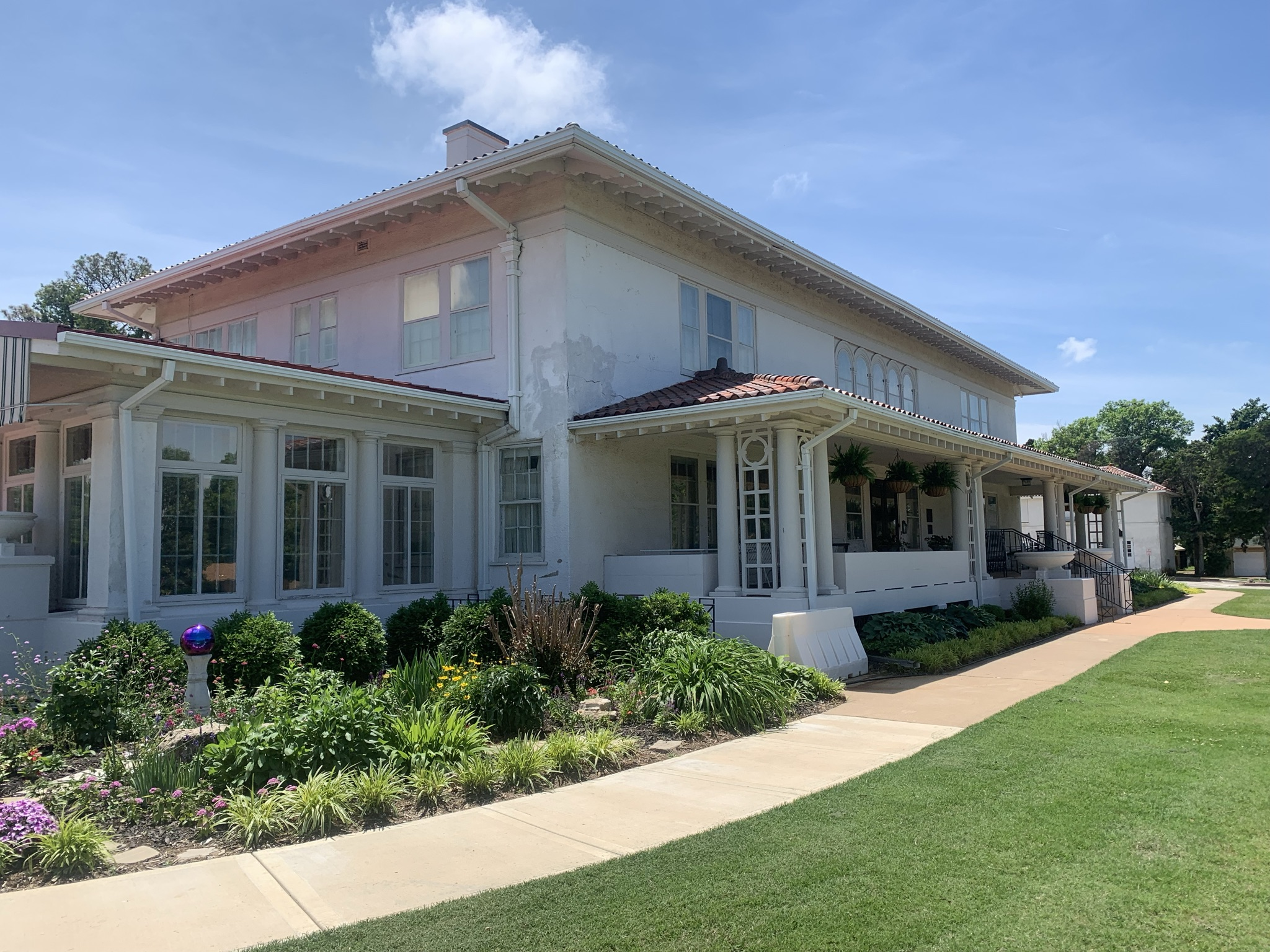
Marland Grand Home from Northeast Lawn

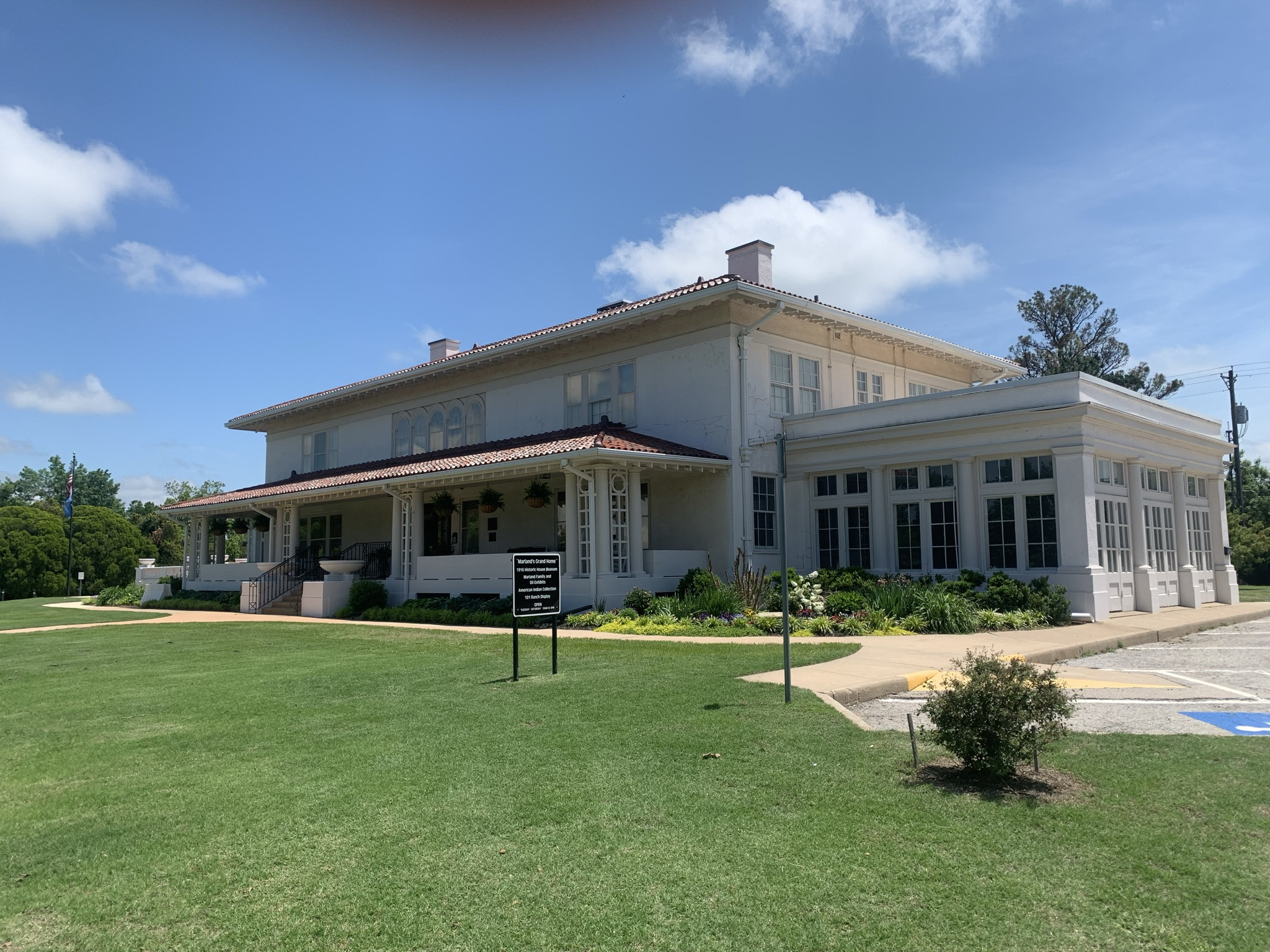
Marland Grand Home from Northwest Lawn

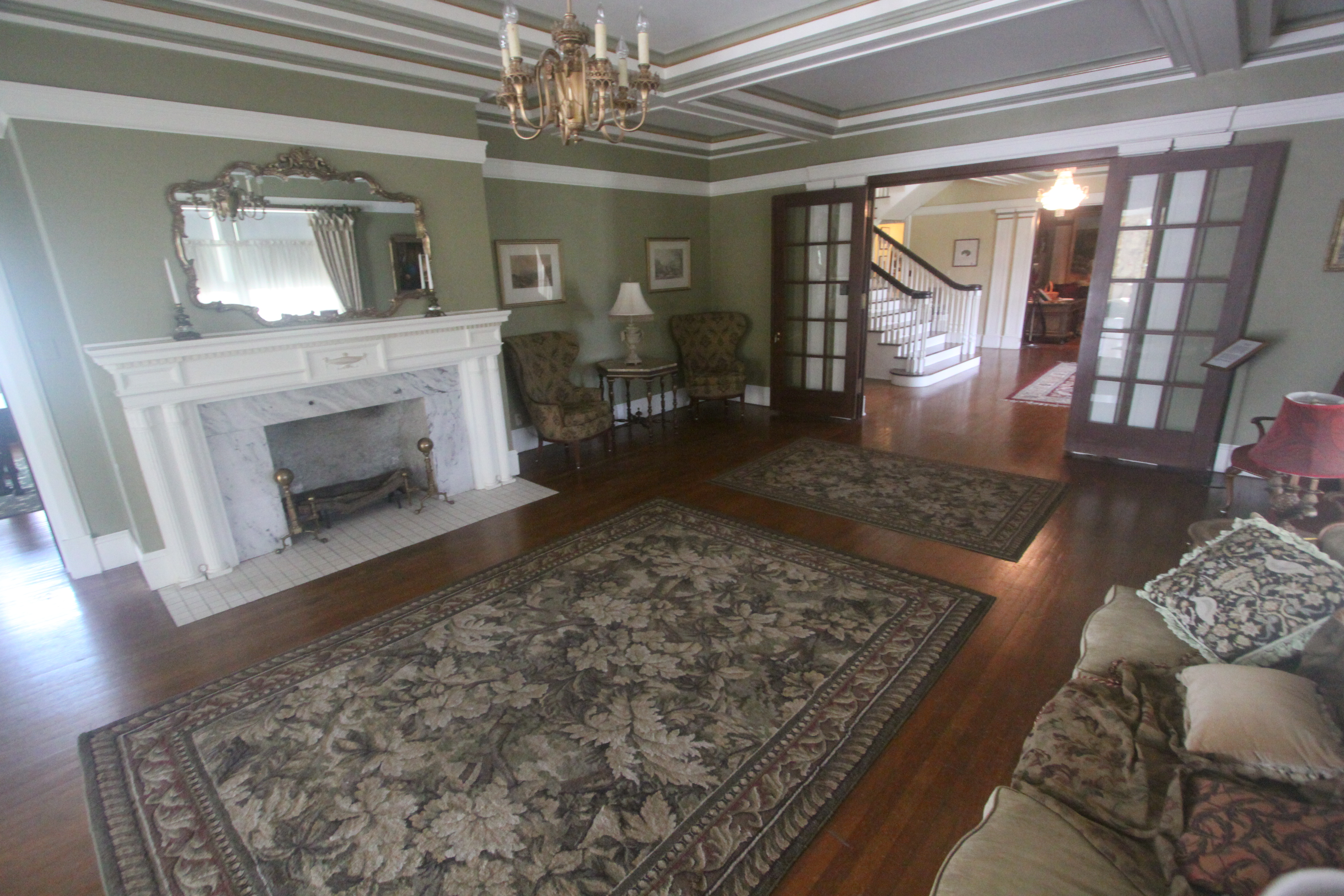
Marland Grand Home Interior - Living Room

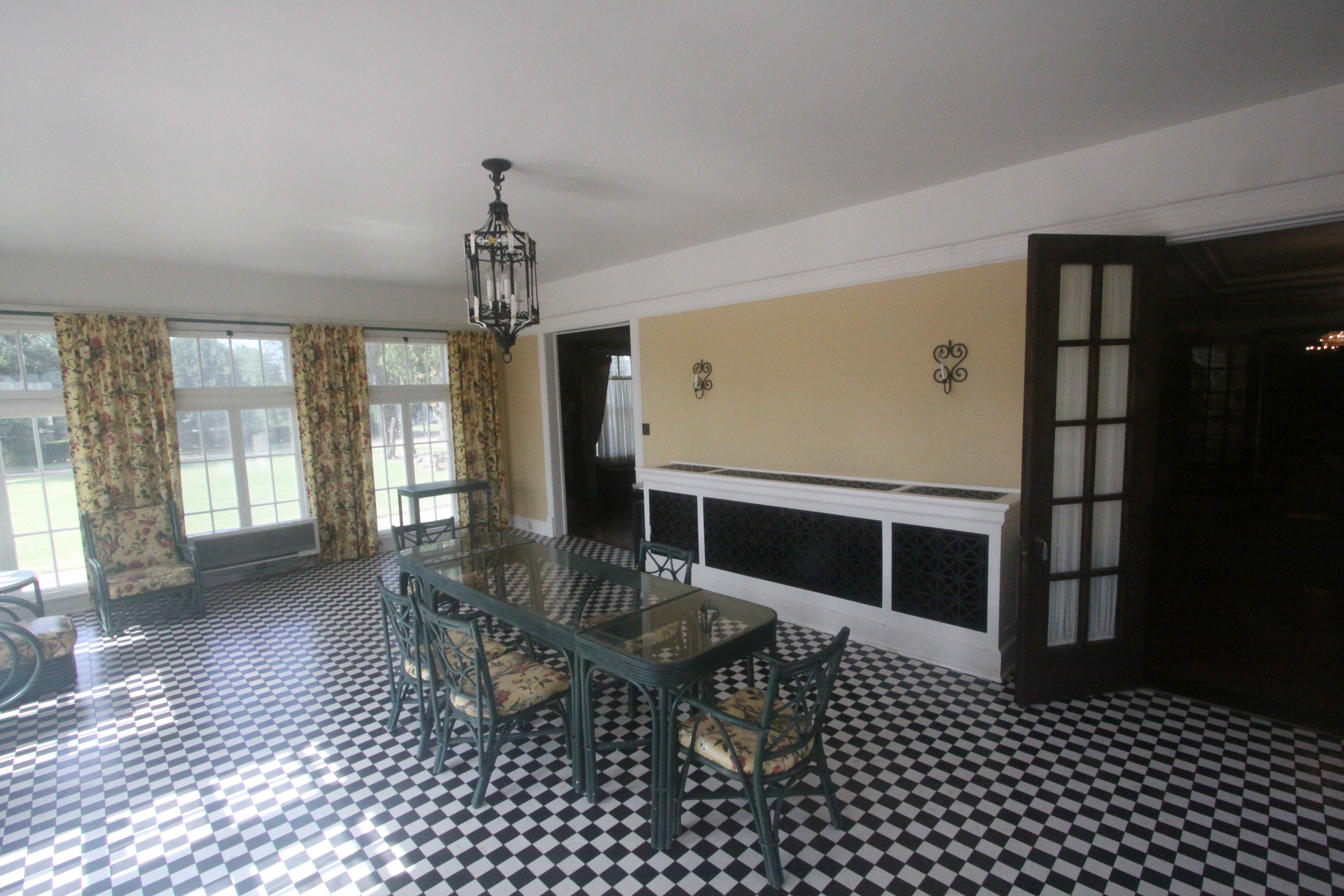
Marland Grand Home Interior - Sun Room

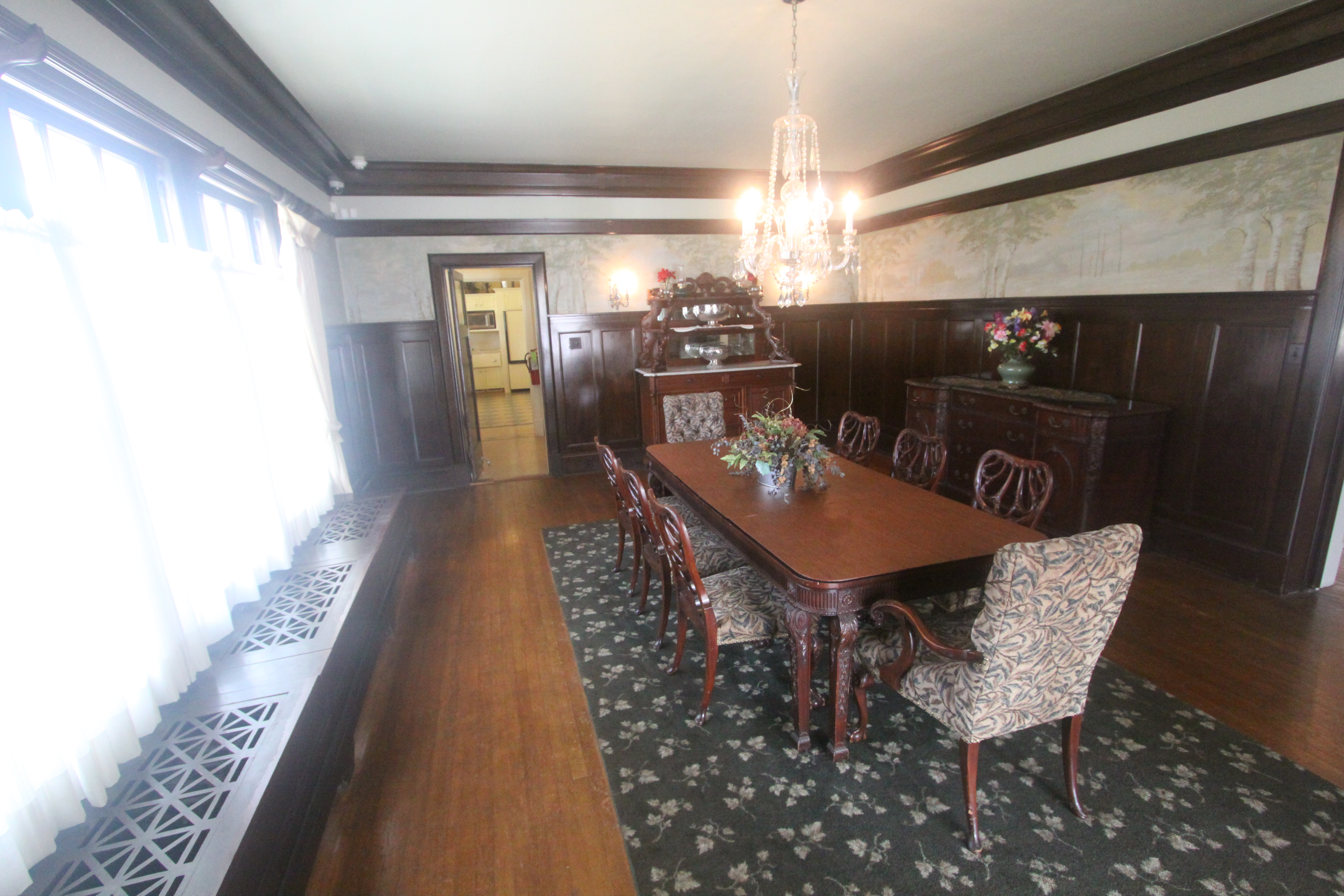
Marland Grand Home Interior - Dining Room

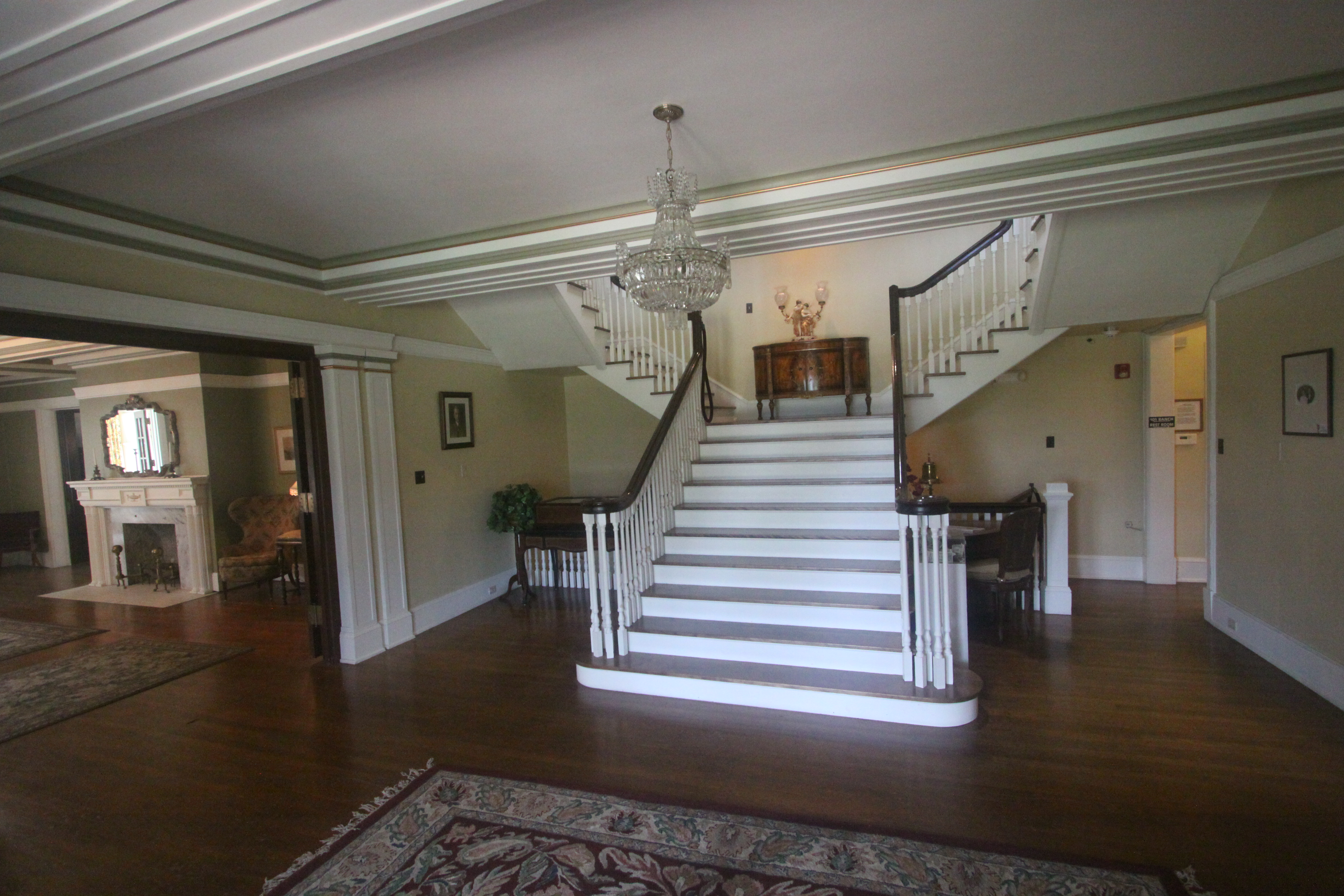
Marland Grand Home Interior - Central Staircase

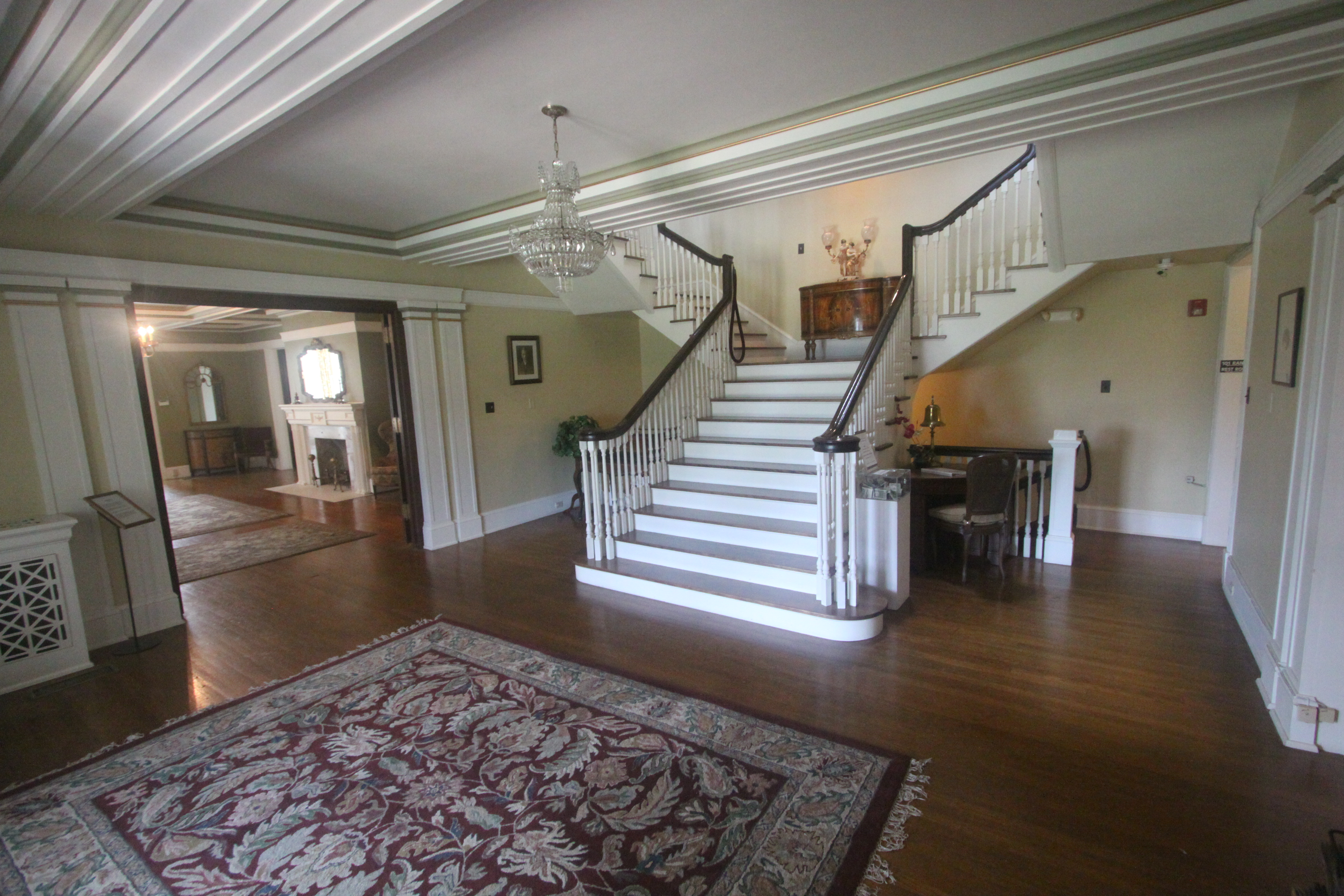
Marland Grand Home Interior - Central Staircase and Living Room

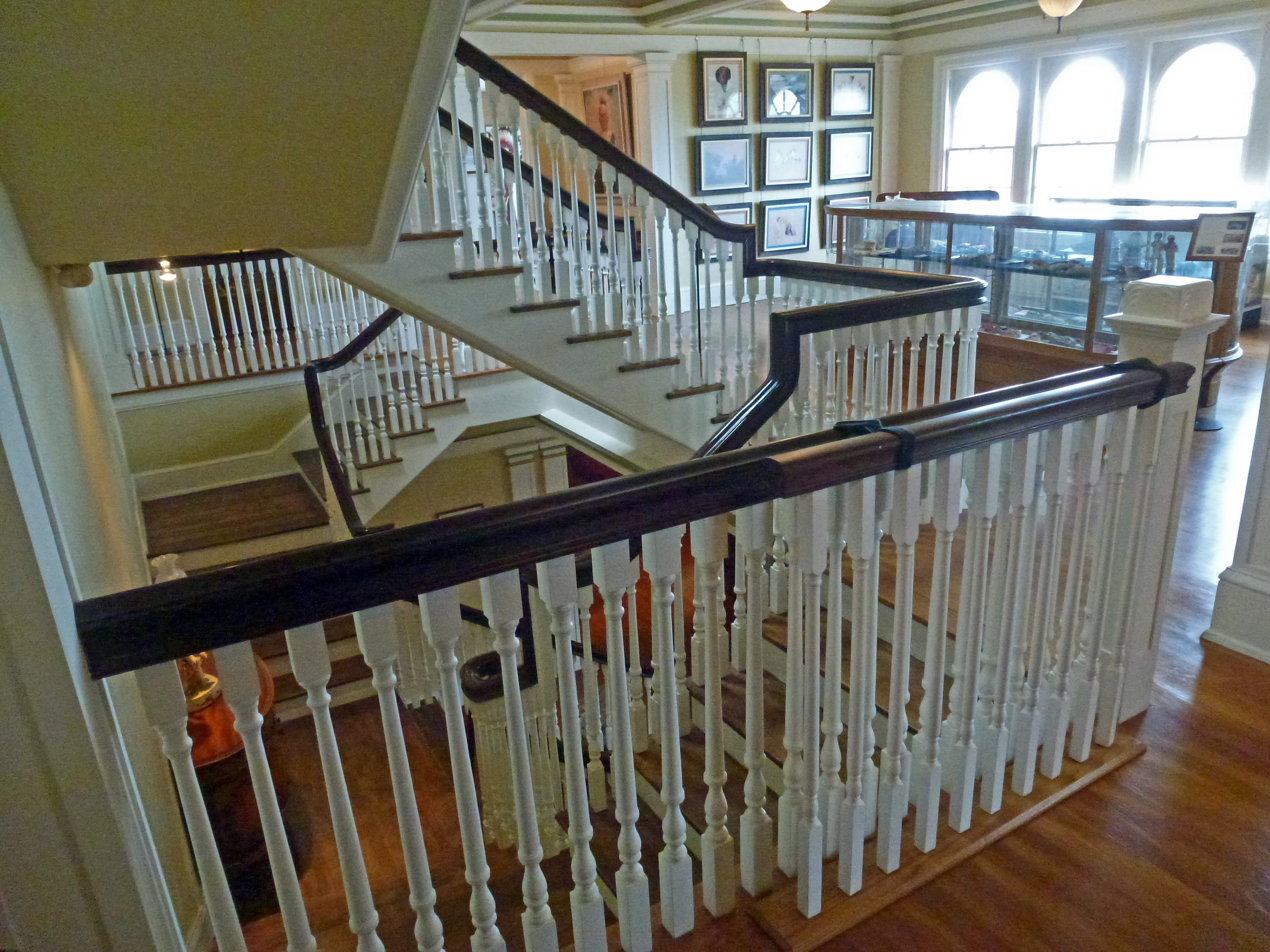
Marland Grand Home Staircase Upper Level

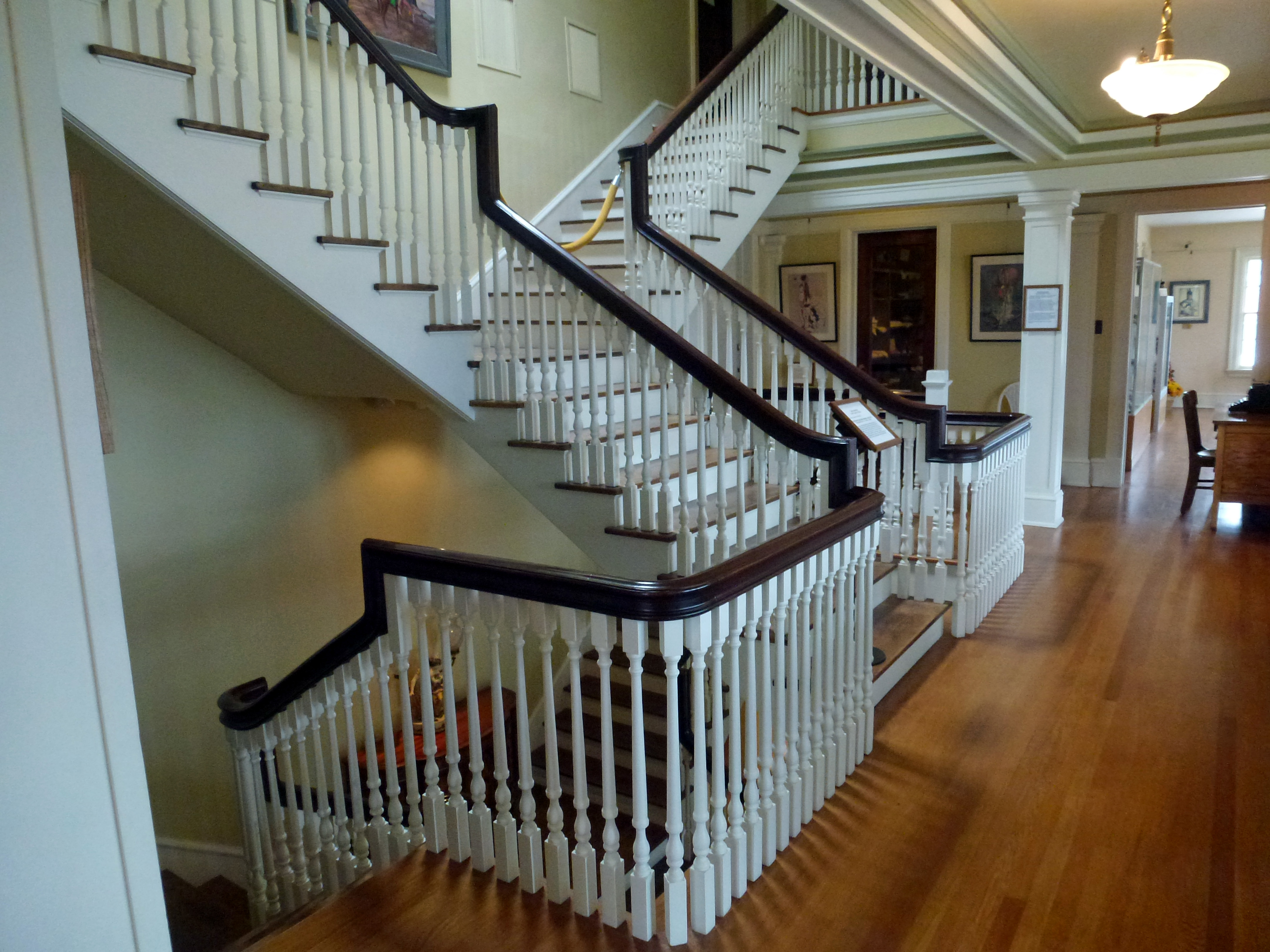
Marland Grand Home Staircase - Upper Level

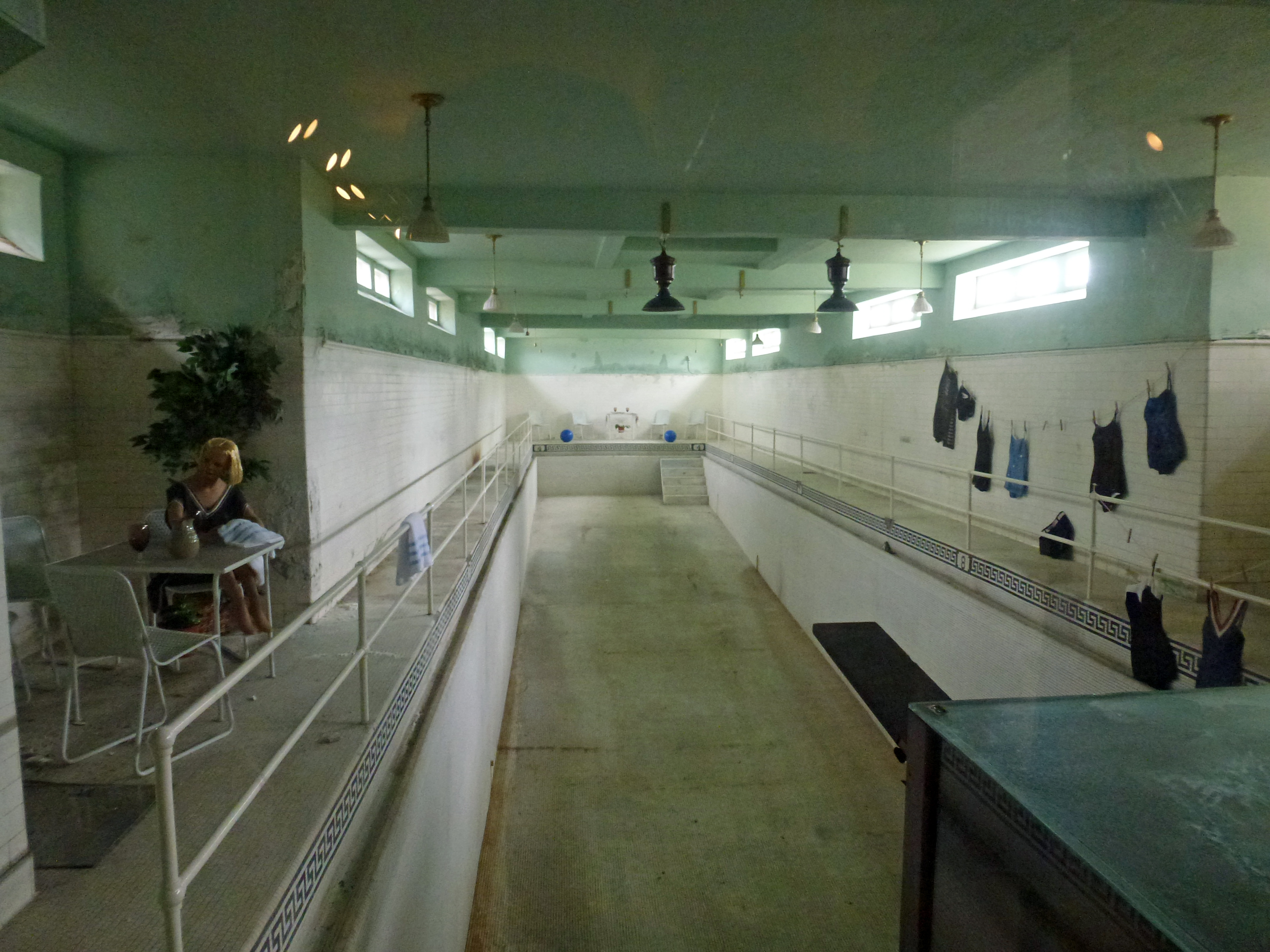
Marland Grand Home Indoor Swimming Pool

== See also ==
- E. W. Marland Mansion
