= Lydie Marland =

American socialite (1900–1987)

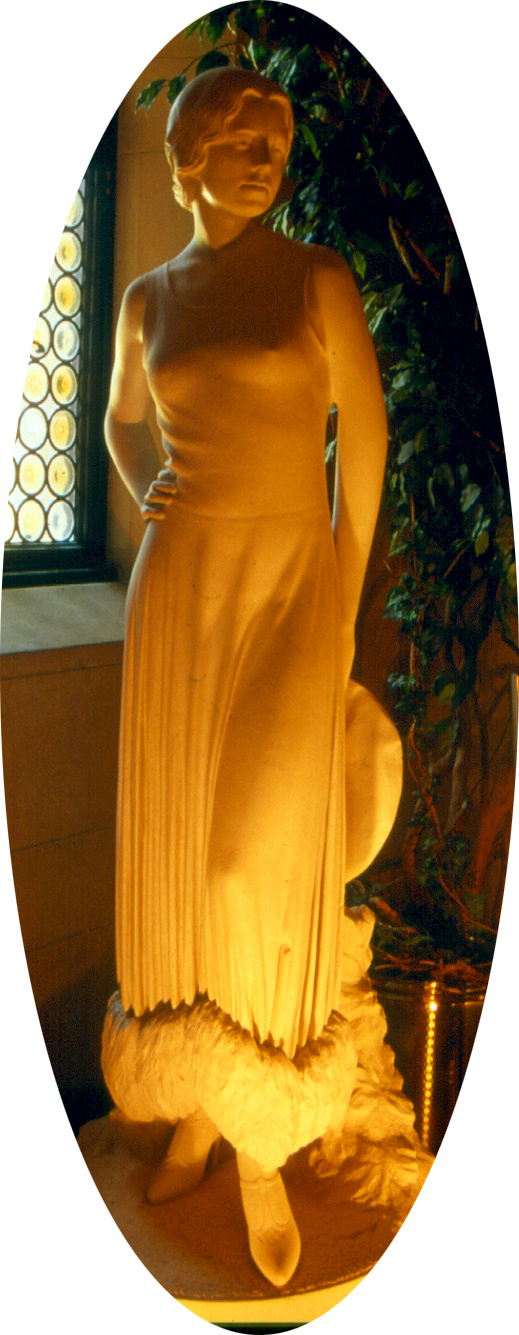
- Lydie Marland by Jo Davidson

8th First Lady of Oklahoma
- In office 1935–1939
- Governor: E. W. Marland
- Preceded by: Mary Alice Hearrell Murray
- Succeeded by: Myrtle Ellenberger Phillips

Personal details
- Born: Lyde Miller Roberts; April 20, 1900 Flourtown, Pennsylvania, U.S.
- Died: July 25, 1987 (aged 87)
- Spouse: Ernest Whitworth Marland

Lydie Marland (April 20, 1900 – July 25, 1987), an American socialite, was born Lyde Miller Roberts in Flourtown, Pennsylvania, the second child of Margaret Reynolds (Collins) and George Frederick Roberts. Her parents decided to give up her and her brother for adoption as teenagers by their maternal aunt and uncle, Virginia and Ernest Whitworth Marland, who were childless and fabulously wealthy from his success in the oil business in Ponca City, Oklahoma.

Two years after Virginia Marland died in 1926, E. W. annulled the adoption of Lydie Roberts Marland. They married that year, when she was 28 and he was 54. Lydie Roberts Marland enjoyed volatile times and drastic changes in fortune with her husband: he lost much of his money in 1928; she accompanied him to Washington, DC after he was elected to the US Congress in 1932, and to the Oklahoma governor's mansion as his First Lady in 1934.

After his gubernatorial term, they lived in the chauffeur's cottage of their former mansion and sold the big house and grounds. Following his death in 1941, Lydie Marland became more reclusive. In the 1950s, she disappeared from Oklahoma for more than a decade. She returned to Ponca City for her later years, and succeeded in having the Marlands' Palace on the Prairies purchased and preserved by the city.

== Early life and education ==
Lydie was one of four children of Margaret Reynolds (Collins) and George Frederick Roberts of Flourtown, Pennsylvania. Her father sold fresh fruits and vegetables from a street cart. Her grandparents were George W. Roberts and Mary B. (Fine) Roberts, and Samuel Cavin Collins, Sr. and Lydie "Eliza" (Miller) Collins.

In 1912 the family visited their mother's sister, Mary Virginia (Collins) (called Virginia) and her husband, E. W. Marland, an oil millionaire in Ponca City, Oklahoma. Lydie and her older brother George summered with their aunt and uncle the next four years and in 1916 the Marlands adopted them both. Lydie was 16 when her aunt and uncle adopted her.

Lydie attended the local Catholic school, but her adoptive parents soon sent her back East to private boarding schools. She finished her education at the Oaksmere School in New Rochelle, located in Westchester County, New York on a property overlooking Long Island Sound. The school was founded by Winifred Edgerton Merrill, the first American woman to be awarded a Ph.D. in mathematics.

Following graduation from Oaksmere, Lydie returned to Ponca City. Because of her family's wealth, her social activities, which included evening parties and formal fox hunts, were followed by local and sometimes national press. Together with polo matches, her adoptive father E. W. Marland had initiated the fox hunts in Oklahoma, importing the red foxes, hunting dogs and hunters (horses) to support his new sports. He also started a local polo club and had polo ponies shipped in, along with trainers.

At this time the Marlands were living in the Grand House on Grand Avenue, where they had developed eight acres of formal gardens with the mansion. (This estate is preserved as the Marland-Paris Mansion and is listed on the National Register of Historic Places.)

They had also commissioned a larger Italian mansion, the "Palace on the Prairie," designed by the architect John Duncan Forsyth. It was under construction from 1925 to 1928. Lydie's adoptive mother Virginia Marland died on June 6, 1926, while construction was underway.

== Marriage and family ==
Seventeen months after her aunt and adoptive mother's death, E. W. Marland and Lydie petitioned a court in Philadelphia to annul her adoption. Immediately afterward they announced plans to marry, but because of a negative response from friends, family, and the public to her relationship with her uncle and adoptive father the wedding was delayed six months. During that time, Lydie had a nervous breakdown and spent time in a New York City hospital and Atlantic City sanatorium. On July 14, 1928, E. W. and Lydie were married in Philadelphia. She was 28 and he was 54. After an extended honeymoon and train travel across Canada to California, the Marlands returned to Ponca City.

== Boom and bust ==
Once considered one of the richest men in the world, Marland lost much of his fortune for a second time. By 1928 the Marland Oil Company, renamed Conoco, had been taken over by "the Wolves of Wall Street", primarily J. P. Morgan Jr. Marland lost out in the transaction and the stock market crash. By 1930, the Marlands had moved out of the Palace and set up in the artist studio and guest house, which was modified for them.

== Political life and "First Lady of Oklahoma" ==
Two years later, in 1932, E. W. ran successfully for the U.S. Congress from Oklahoma's 8th congressional district, and the couple moved to Washington, D. C.

In 1934, they returned to Oklahoma after Marland was elected as governor. Lydie served as his First Lady. Although his tenure [1935–1939] was politically successful, Marland lost more money while in office. To ensure that he would not benefit financially from his position, he put his investments in trust during his tenure. He took seriously his oath that he would not, "knowingly, receive, directly or indirectly, any money or other valuable thing, for the performance or nonperformance of any act or duty pertaining to my office, other than the compensation allowed by law." He was financially broken by the end of his term.

In 1941, the Marlands moved into the chauffeur's quarters and sold their Palace on the Prairie and most of the property to the Discalced Carmelite Fathers of Mexico. Marland died several months later, leaving Lydie a widow at age 41. She continued living in the chauffeur's cottage for another dozen years, becoming increasingly reclusive.

The Carmelite Fathers asked for the removal of a statue of Lydie by Jo Davidson, which her husband had commissioned for the grounds. Lydie paid a Ponca City man to haul it away.

== Later years ==
In 1953, Marland had a nervous breakdown, publicly fought with her boyfriend Louis Cassel, ordered the destruction of her statue, and loaded her remaining possessions into a car before driving away from Ponca City without a driver's license. Her whereabouts for the next 22 years remain mostly a mystery. Because her older brother reported her missing in November 1958, newspapers reported on rumors of her whereabouts over the years including working as a maid for a motel in Independence, Missouri, standing in a bread line in New York City, marching in an anti-Vietnam War rally in Washington, D.C., and living with a priest in San Francisco.

In 1975, a Ponca City lawyer C. D. Northcutt located Marland living on the street in Washington, D.C., and financed her return to Ponca City. She moved back into the chauffeur's cottage. Although a recluse, she led efforts to have Ponca City purchase the Palace on the Prairie when it came up for sale again, and turn it into a house museum. She and other supporters were successful in having the Palace bought and preserved as a historic property. She continued to live in the cottage until her death on July 25, 1987.

Years later, the Ponca City man who had removed her statue talked about the event on his deathbed. He described where he had buried the statue in a crate. It was eventually discovered by Paul Prather, former curator emeritus of the mansion, as documented in a feature that appeared in the Sunday Oklahoman, dug up and restored by patrons. The statue of Lydie now stands next to a Davidson portrayal of her brother George Roberts Marland in the entrance hallway of what is now known as the E. W. Marland Mansion.

This mansion has been designated a National Historic Landmark. Together the two Marland mansions and outbuildings have been adapted to house some small museums, devoted to art and to Native American crafts and culture, as well as exhibits on the Marland family and Oklahoma's oil business.

== Cancelled biographical film ==
In August 2012 the Weinstein Company announced plans to produce the romantic drama, Ends of the Earth, directed by Academy Award-nominee David O. Russell, written by Academy Award-winning screenwriter Chris Terrio, based on the lives of E. W. and Lydie Marland and starring Academy Award-winning actress Jennifer Lawrence as Lydie Marland. The story follows the love affair between an oil baron and his adopted daughter, and the loss of the empire they built together. By March 2013, the project had stalled. Since Harvey Weinstein's arrest in 2018, the project has been indefinitely postponed.

== Works cited ==
- Pinnell, Gary Robert (Winter 2023). "These Are Lydie Marland's Words". Chronicles of Oklahoma. 101 (4): 428–451.
