= Lamerton House =

Historic house in Oklahoma, United States

- U.S. National Register of Historic Places
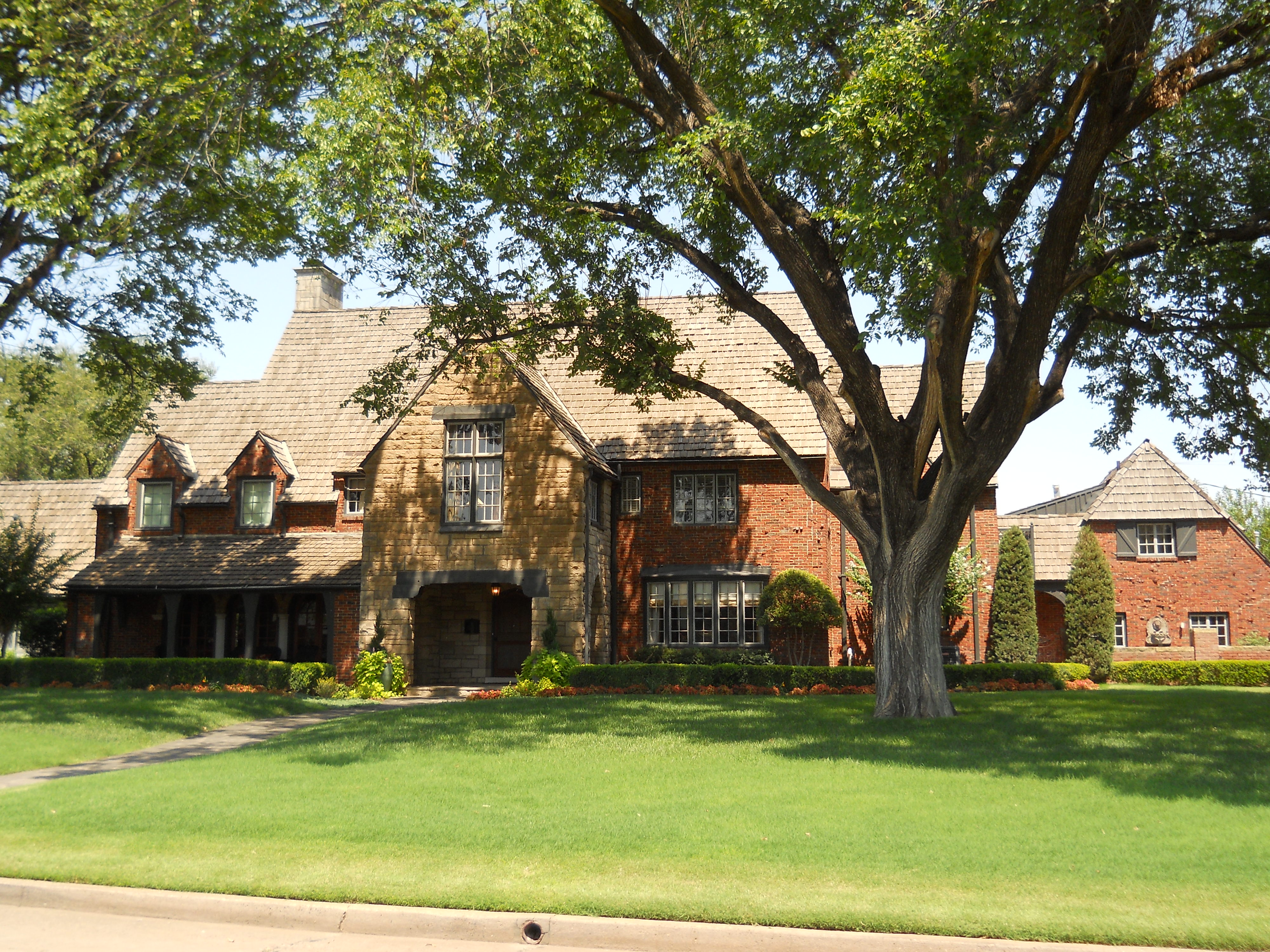

- Location within Oklahoma Location within the United States
- Location: 1420 W. Indian Drive, Enid, Oklahoma
- Coordinates: 36°23′12″N 97°53′41″W
- Area: less than one acre
- Built: 1930
- Architect: John Duncan Forsyth
- Architectural style: Tudor Revival
- NRHP reference No.: 97000613
- Added to NRHP: June 20, 1997

The Lamerton House is a historic house constructed in 1930 located on the 40-acre (16 ha) Lamerton Terrace property Enid, Oklahoma in Garfield County.

== Description and history ==
The two-story Tudor Revival style home was designed in 1928 by John Duncan Forsyth of Tulsa, Oklahoma for Dr. William E. Lamerton and his wife, Grace T. Lamerton. Forsyth also designed a Colonial Revival style home for Park Lamerton, the couple's son. The Lamertons developed their acreage into the Lamerton Terrace (1932), Lamerton's 2nd Addition (1952), and Lamerton's 3rd Addition (1954).

It was listed on the National Register of Historic Places on June 20, 1997.
