= E. W. Marland =

American oil man and politician (1874–1941)

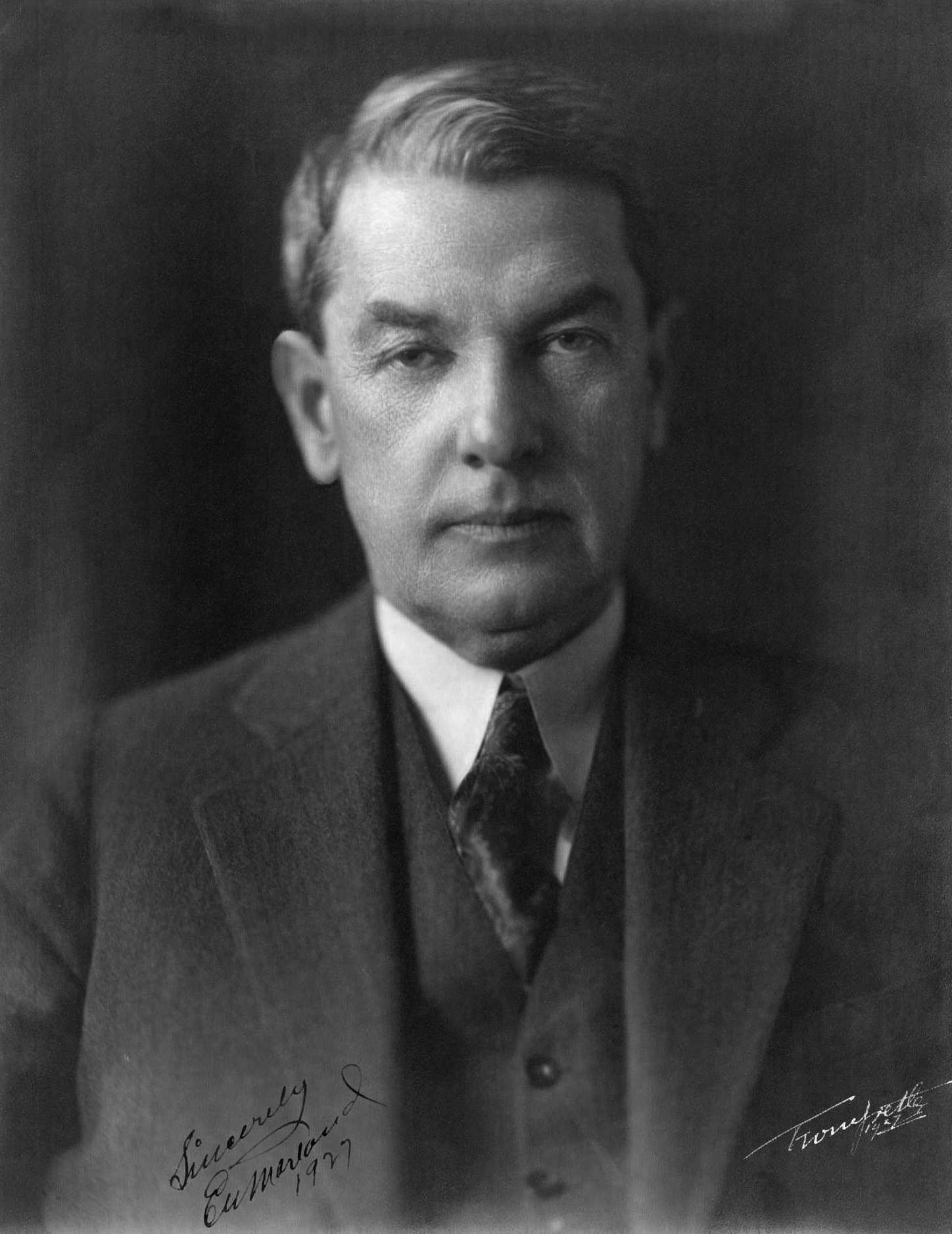
- Portrait by Solomon Trompetter c. 1927

10th Governor of Oklahoma
- In office January 15, 1935 – January 9, 1939
- Lieutenant: James E. Berry
- Preceded by: William H. Murray
- Succeeded by: Leon C. Phillips

Member of the U.S. House of Representatives from Oklahoma's 8th district
- In office March 4, 1933 – January 3, 1935
- Preceded by: Milton C. Garber
- Succeeded by: Phil Ferguson

Personal details
- Born: Ernest Whitworth Marland; May 8, 1874 Pittsburgh, Pennsylvania, U.S.
- Died: October 3, 1941 (aged 67) Ponca City, Oklahoma, U.S.
- Party: Democratic
- Spouses: Mary Virginia Collins (m. 1903–1926) Lydie Roberts Marland (m. 1928)
- Parent: Alfred Marland (father)
- Relatives: Samuel Collins (father-in-law)
- Education: University of Michigan Law School; University of Michigan, at Ann Arbor
- Profession: Lawyer, Businessperson

Ernest Whitworth Marland (May 8, 1874 – October 3, 1941) was an American lawyer, oil businessman in Pennsylvania and later Oklahoma, and politician who was a United States representative (congressman) and 10th governor of Oklahoma. He served in the United States House of Representatives (lower chamber of the Congress of the United States) from a district in northern Oklahoma, 1933 to 1935, and as the tenth governor of Oklahoma from 1935 to 1939. As a Democrat, he initiated a "Little Deal" in Oklahoma during the Great Depression of the 1930s, working to relieve the distress of unemployed people and the economic hardships affecting the state and nation-wide and to build infrastructure as investment for the future.

Marland made his earlier fortunes in oil in Pennsylvania in the early 1900s and more later in Oklahoma during the 1920s, and lost each in the volatility of the industry and the times. At the height of his wealth in the 1920s, Marland built a mansion known as the Palace of the Prairies in Ponca City, after introducing fox hunting and polo on horseback to the local wealthy elite society. It has since been designated a National Historic Landmark. The Marland-Paris Mansion, his former home on Grand Avenue, is also listed on the National Register of Historic Places (listings maintained by the National Park Service of the United States Department of the Interior).

Marland and his first wife Virginia did not have any children. To share their wealth and help her sister Margaret Roberts and her family, in 1916 they adopted their two children, nephew and niece George and Lydie, who were then 19 and 16 years old. The Marlands sent them to private school and gave them other advantages. A decade later and two years after first wife Virginia's death in 1926, Marland had niece Lydie's adoption annulled. He then married her as Lydie Roberts Marland (1900–1987), that same year when she was age 26 years, and she later accompanied him during the subsequent decade of the 1930s to Washington, D.C. when he served in the U.S. Congress, and later in the governor's mansion in Oklahoma City.

== Early life and education ==
Ernest Whitworth Marland was born in Pittsburgh, Pennsylvania on May 8, 1874, to Alfred and Sara Marland. His father was a mill owner in Pittsburgh who boasted in his later years that he never had a strike in his mill and his workers remembered him as having been "always fair to labor". This gave the son his belief in capitalism and his understanding of the importance of good labor relations.

Marland was educated in private schools, he did collegiate and law studies on an accelerated schedule, earning his LL.B. from the University of Michigan Law School at the age of 19 in 1893.

== Marriage and family ==
Marland waited to marry until he was well-established. He first married Mary Virginia Collins, known as Virginia, on November 5, 1903, in Philadelphia, Pennsylvania. In December 1908 they decided to move west to Oklahoma, where they found renewed success in its subsequent discoveries and drilling oil boom. They however had no children of their own.

In 1916, to help Virginia's sister Margaret Roberts and husband George Roberts, and to share their wealth, they adopted the Roberts' two children, George and Lydie, then ages 19 and 16, respectively. They sent them to private schools and gave them other opportunities. The Marlands were together until Virginia's death from pneumonia on June 6, 1926, in Ponca City, (Kay County), Oklahoma.

E. W. Marland had Lydie Roberts Marland's adoption annulled. The New York Times published news of Marland's engagement (a month before) to Lydie Roberts Marland, the daughter of his late wife's sister on January 6, 1928. The front-page notice was followed by an adjacent news item reporting the reaction by Miss Roberts' mother, "who broke down and wept when she learned of the engagement." On July 14, 1928, Marland married Lydie Roberts in Flourtown. She was at the time age 28 and he was age 54. They were together for 13 years through his political service career and short retirement until his death on October 3, 1941.

== Career ==
After law school, Marland returned to Pittsburgh where he started a private practice. Through his experiences as an attorney, he became interested in geology and entered the developing oil industry in Pennsylvania. He invested in new wells and companies and, by the age of 33, Marland had become a self-made millionaire.

That same year, Marland lost millions in the financial panic of 1907 and subsequent recession. By 1908, Marland was broke and without a job. Hoping to start over, Marland and Virginia moved west to the new 46th state of Oklahoma, admitted to the Union in 1907. They settled in Ponca City, where he resumed his oil career.

Marland first founded the 101 Ranch Oil Company. He was successful in reestablishing his fortune. By 12 years later in 1920, it was estimated to be worth at $85,000,000 ($85 million, or roughly $910 million in 2024 U.S. dollars). That year he founded the Marland Oil Company in Ponca City (incorporated in Delaware on October 8, 1920) and served as its president. In 1928, the Marland Oil Company was taken over in a hostile bid by Wall Street / New York City tycoon J. P. Morgan, Jr. and was merged with the Continental Oil and Transportation Company (CONOCO). Marland's oil empire was destroyed and he was pushed out of the company leadership and replaced as President of Marland Oil by Dan Moran. He lost all of his wealth for the second time. Marland remained bitter about his treatment at the hands of Investment bankers which he called "The Money Trust" producing a pamphlet which heavily criticised the power of Financial Institutions over industrialists like him.

He and William Skelly were instrumental in the founding of the Kansas-Oklahoma division of the United States Oil and Gas Association, then known as "Mid-Continent Oil and Gas Association".

=== U.S. Representative (Congressman) ===
His treatment at the hands of Morgan and other eastern Republican Party politically connected bankers and big businessmen led him to leave the Republican Party and re-register as a Democrat. Marland supported Franklin D. Roosevelt's New Deal programs from the beginning of his presidential administration. Through association with the popular FDR, Marland was elected in 1932 to the United States House of Representatives to represent Oklahoma's 8th congressional district in the northern part of the state (since disbanded / redistricted). Congressman Marland was the first Democrat to hold that seat representing Oklahoma in 15 years.

Marland served in the Congress for a single two-years term, from 1933 to 1935. He declined reelection after entering the Democratic primary election to succeed ninth Governor William H. Murray. Marland won both the Democratic nomination and the general election in November 1934 to serve as the tenth governor of the state.

=== Governor of Oklahoma ===
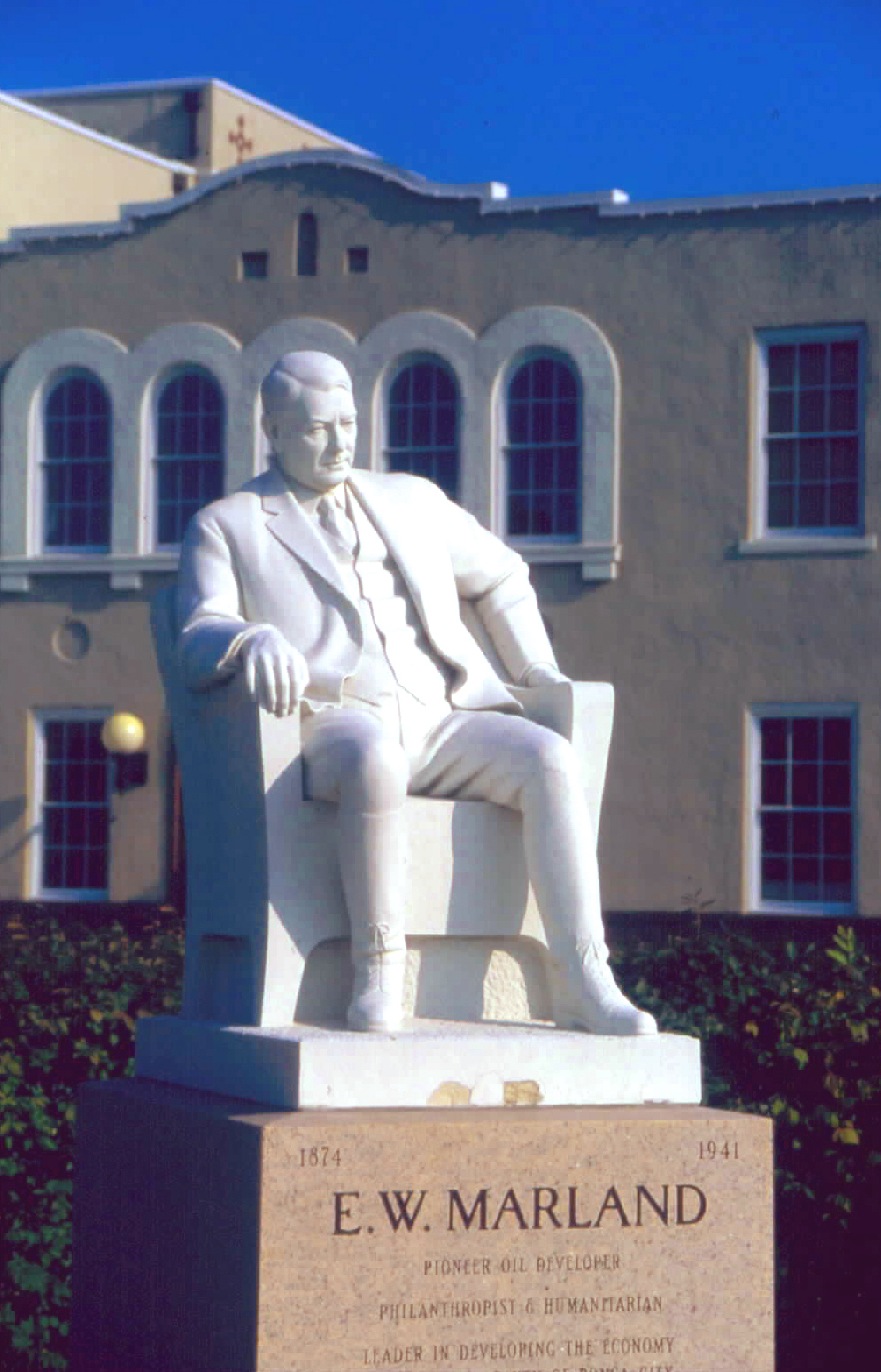
10th Governor of Oklahoma E. W. (Ernest Whitworth) Marland (1874–1941, served 1935–1939), by sculptor / artist Jo Davidson, c.1928, Ponca City, Oklahoma

On January 15, 1935, Marland was inaugurated as the tenth governor. Several years before, the widower had married Lydie Roberts Marland, his niece and former adopted step-daughter. She was then 28 years old and he was age 54. She became First Lady of Oklahoma

Governor Marland quickly instituted a program that would become known as the "Little New Deal". From the start, the lower chamber of the Oklahoma House of Representatives and upper chamber of the Oklahoma Senate were dominated by the opposition against his plans. The state legislature was more concerned with reducing the state's massive budget monetary deficit (roughly a quarter of a billion dollars in modern 2024 currency). Marland, an avid supporter of FDR and the Progressive / Liberal social / economic agenda, stressed the need for the state government to work with the federal government in creating jobs and support for impoverished families.

Despite Marland's efforts, most Oklahoman politicians never fully embraced the New Deal agenda of President Roosevelt, more popular elsewhere in America. What the Oklahoma Legislature would accept was a homestead exemption provision to the state's ad valorem taxes, increased school funds, and raising the state sales tax to two percent. Marland introduced legislation to appropriate funds raised by the sales tax for aid to the handicapped, the elderly, and dependent children.

At the time, Oklahoma had an estimated 150,000 Oklahomans unemployed and 700,000 on relief. Marland asked the Fifteenth Legislature for a board to craft policy to develop the physical infrastructure of the state with investments to create a more diverse economy. The Legislature responded with the 15-member State Planning and Resources Board. The Board worked with FDR's Works Progress Administration (W.P.A.) to create jobs through public works projects such as construction of dams and tree planting. The State Highway Department expanded its road work and created thousands of jobs. Historic properties and renovated, archeological excavations were undertaken to identify and preserve resources, and other resources were enhanced.

Though he did not balance the state's budget, Marland created the Oklahoma Highway Patrol state police agency and the Interstate Oil Compact. Through the Compact, six oil-producing states in the U.S.A. agreed to practice oil conservation and establish a fair price for petroleum. The governing body of the Compact was a commission, of which Marland was elected to serve as the first president.

Marland's term as governor ended after four years on January 9, 1939. Through more than 1,300 WPA projects, he had created jobs for more than 90,000 Oklahomans. After his term, he returned to Ponca City and tried to recreate the Marland Oil Company.

In 1940, ex-Governor Marland ran again for the United States House of Representatives in Congress but was unsuccessful against another Republican candidate.

== Pioneer Woman statue ==
Protective by John Gregory: one of twelve Pioneer Woman models displayed at the Marland Mansion.

The Pioneer Woman statue was created by sculptor Bryant Baker and was unveiled in a public ceremony on April 22, 1930. Forty thousand guests came to hear Will Rogers pay tribute to Oklahoma's pioneers. The statue is 27 feet (8.2 m) high and weighs 12,000 pounds.

In the early 1920s while enjoying his great oil wealth, Marland decided to commission a statue, the Pioneer Woman, for installation in Ponca City. Marland was asked, "E. W., why don't you have sculptor Jo Davidson make a statue to the vanishing American, a Ponca, Otoe, or an Osage – a monument of great size?" Marland answered, "The Indian is not the vanishing American – it's the pioneer woman."

Marland commissioned twelve small 3-foot (0.91 m) sculptures by US and international sculptors as models for the Pioneer Woman statue. Marland paid each sculptor a commission, cited as $10,000 or as $2,000 for each submission. The miniatures were shipped for exhibit in twelve cities, where they were viewed by a total of 750,000 people. Marland invited them to vote for their favorite but said he would make the final selection.

The twelve submissions included Confident by Bryant Baker; Self-Reliant by Alexander Stirling Calder; Trusting by Jo Davidson; Affectionate by James E. Fraser; Protective by John Gregory; Adventurous by F. Lynn Jenkins; Heroic by Mario Korbel; Faithful by Arthur Lee; Challenging by Hermon Atkins MacNeil; Determined by Maurice Sterne; Fearless by Wheeler Williams; and Sturdy by Mahonri Young. The New York Times reported on March 27, 1927, that the exhibition had arrived in New York City and that it had attracted "more interest than any exhibition of sculpture New York has known in a long while." After being exhibited for three weeks in the Reinhardt Galleries, Bryant Baker's model won first place in the New York balloting. The Times reported that "Baker not only won first honors, but was the last man to enter the contest having no more than a month to prepare his model and obtain a casting."

I believe all of the sculptors have done well. We could select any one of the twelve figures and get an excellent interpretation of the frontier woman. The decision will be a hard one to make. I expect to be guided largely by public taste, but the final decision will be my own. This national vote is going to show exactly what the American people think about one of the greatest of their women.

The exhibition touched a popular chord in American culture of the time. The New York Times reported on March 27, 1927, that among the visitors was 91‑year‑old Betty Wollman, who as a young bride had journeyed from St. Louis, Missouri, to Leavenworth, Kansas, in 1855. She had once entertained Abraham Lincoln as a dinner guest in the Wollman household, long before he was a candidate for president. Wollman spoke about women's role during pioneer days in the Old West and congratulated Marland for his proposal to erect a statue in her honor.

The winning statue nationwide was Confident, which featured a woman and her son, by the British-born American sculptor Bryant Baker. Marland's personal favorite was said to be Trusting by Jo Davidson, who had already sculpted statues of Marland and his adopted children: George and Lydie.

On April 22, 1930, at a reception for 40,000 guests, Baker's sculpture was unveiled in Ponca City in a public ceremony. Guest speaker Will Rogers paid tribute to Oklahoma's pioneers. President Herbert Hoover addressed the nation in a radio broadcast to commemorate the statue. He said, "It was those women who carried the refinement, the moral character and spiritual force into the West.

The finished Pioneer Woman is 27 feet (8.2 m) high and weighs 12,000 pounds.

== Death ==
Marland died of a heart condition on October 3, 1941, at the age of 67. He is buried in Ponca City.

== Movie about Marland ==
- Filmmaker Scott Swearingen made a documentary about the oilman, High Stakes: The Life and Times of E.W. Marland (2016), which he co-produced with Steve Herrin. Supported with funding by the Marland Foundation, the film was featured with a panel discussion at the Oklahoma Historical Society on September 13, 2016.
- In August 2012, the Weinstein Company, announced that it was to produce the romantic drama film Ends of the Earth, written by Academy Award-winning screenwriter Chris Terrio, and based on the lives of EW and Lydie Marland. The screenplay was said to explore the controversial love affair between the oil baron and former Oklahoma governor, and his adopted daughter, who built a mansion and other extravagances in Ponca City, Oklahoma. Actress Jennifer Lawrence was cast in the role of Lydie Marland. The screenplay went through several rewrites and the film may still be in development.

== Commemoration ==
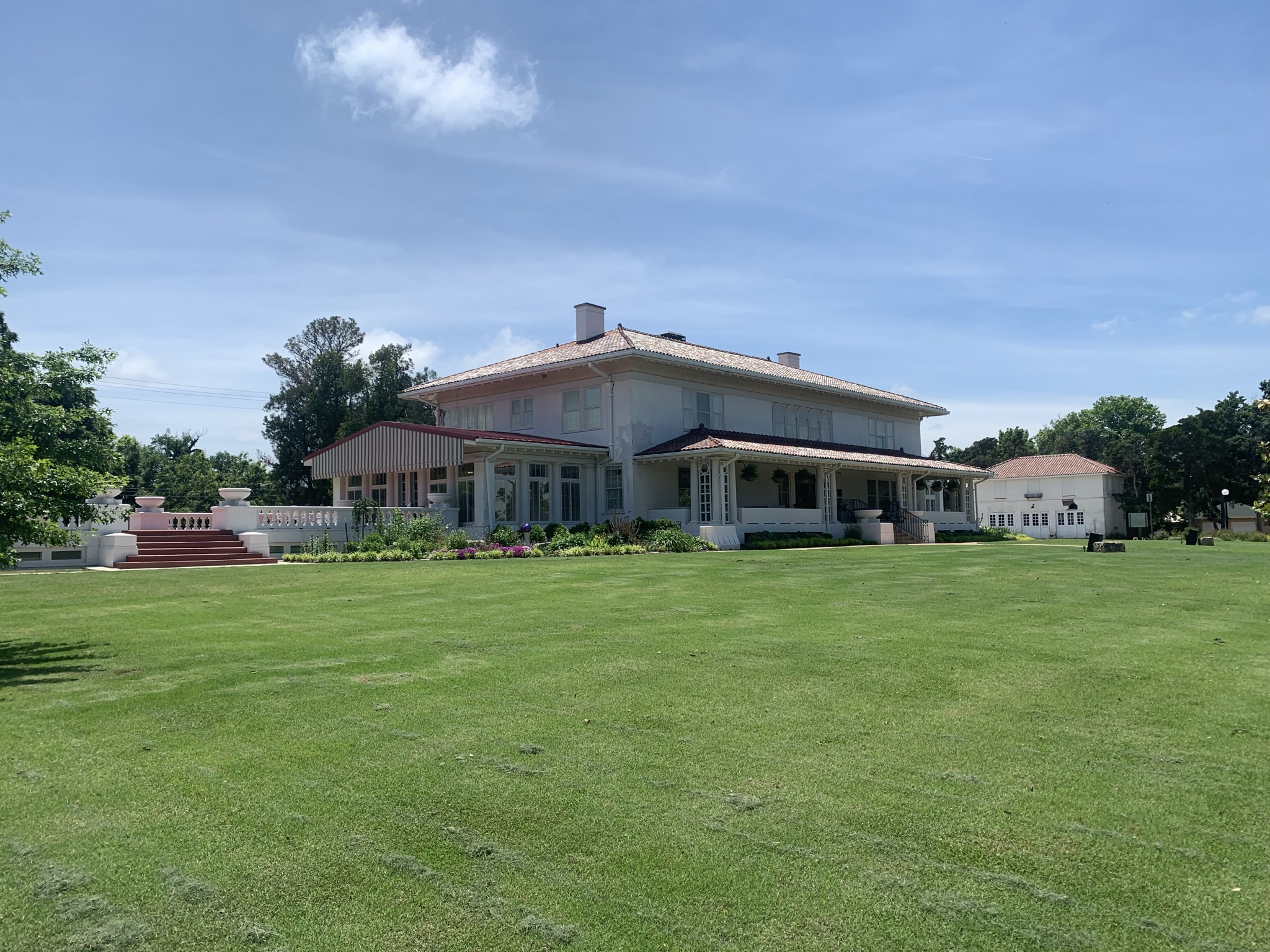
The Marland Grand Home is listed on the National Register of Historic Places

- His Italianate mansion in Ponca City, the 55-room E. W. Marland Mansion designed by John Duncan Forsyth, was declared a National Historic Landmark in 1977.
- His previous home, known as the Marland Grand Home, located on Grand Avenue with eight acres of formal gardens, is listed on the National Register of Historic Places.

== State of the State speeches ==
- First State of the State Speech
- Second State of the State Speech
- Third State of the State Speech
- Fourth State of the State Speech

== Works cited ==
- Mathews, John Joseph (1951). Life and Death of an Oilman: The Career of E.W. Marland. Norman: University of Oklahoma Press. ISBN 978-0-8061-1238-1.

Party political offices
Preceded by William H. Murray	Democratic nominee for Governor of Oklahoma; 1934	Succeeded by Leon C. Phillips
Political offices
Preceded by William H. Murray	Governor of Oklahoma; 1935–1939	Succeeded by Leon C. Phillips
U.S. House of Representatives
Preceded by Milton C. Garber	Member of the U.S. House of Representatives from Oklahoma's 8th congressional district 1933–1935	Succeeded by Phil Ferguson
