= Samuel Collins (Pennsylvania politician) =

American politician

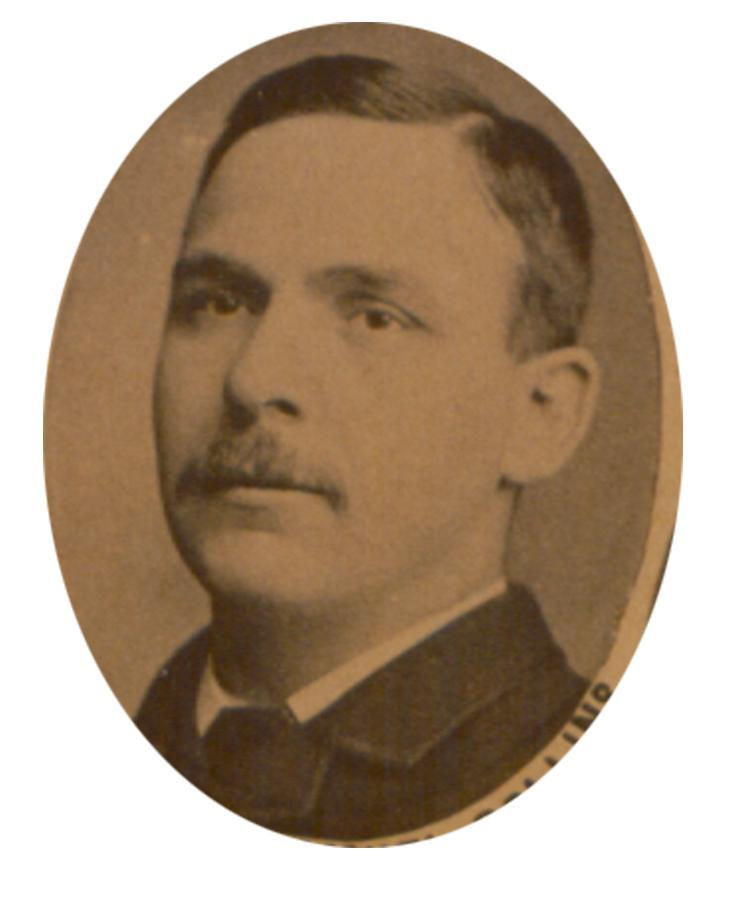
- Collins around 1888

Member of the Pennsylvania House of Representatives from the Philadelphia County district
- In office 1887–1888

Personal details
- Born: July 22, 1850 Philadelphia, Pennsylvania, United States
- Died: February 25, 1927 (aged 76) Ponca City, Oklahoma, United States
- Relatives: E. W. Marland (son-in-law); Lydie Marland (granddaughter)

Samuel Collins (July 22, 1850 – February 25, 1927) was an American politician who served in the Pennsylvania House of Representatives from 1887 to 1888. He was the grandfather of Lydie Marland.

== Biography ==
Samuel Collins was born on July 22, 1850, in Philadelphia. He worked as an engineer before being elected to the Pennsylvania House of Representatives in 1886. He served from 1887 to 1888, represented Philadelphia County, and was a member of the Republican Party. He did not run for reelection in 1888 and worked for the Superior Court of Pennsylvania before entering the oil business. He died in Ponca City, Oklahoma, on February 25, 1927, and was buried at Mount Moriah Cemetery in Philadelphia.

His daughter, Mary Virginia Collins, married E. W. Marland.
