= Dan Moran =

American oil executive

Daniel James Moran
- Born: May 31, 1888; Cygnet, Ohio, U.S.
- Died: April 3, 1948 (aged 59); Houston, Texas, U.S.
- Education: University of Dayton, (B.Sc, 1907)
- Spouse: Marie Elizabeth Farasey (m. 1921)

Daniel James Moran (May 31, 1888 – April 3, 1948) was an American oilman who served as a senior officer with Texaco, Marland Oil, and Continental Oil. Moran was the first President of Conoco oil company. After E. W. Marland lost control of Marland Oil Company to J. P. Morgan in 1928, Moran was brought in as the new president. Moran successfully acquired Continental Oil Company and merged it with Marland Oil creating a new company called Conoco. Moran ran Conoco from 1928 to 1947 and saw the company successfully through the great depression and World War II. Under Moran's leadership, Conoco became a pioneer in offshore drilling, continental pipelines, petrochemicals, and aviation fuel.

== Honors ==
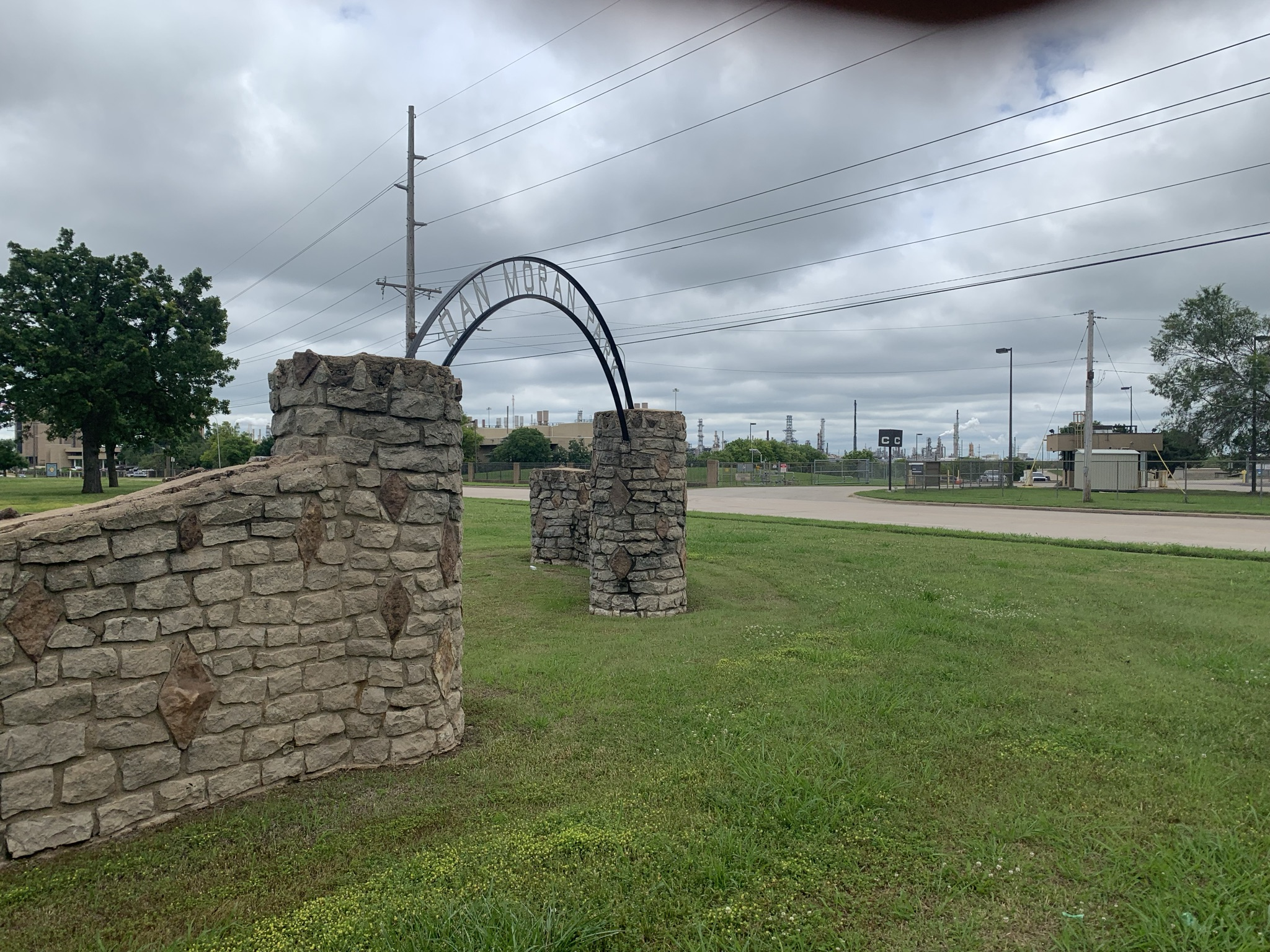
Dan Moran Park

Dan Moran Park in Ponca City, Oklahoma is named for Moran.

Moran is honored with a medallion at the Conoco Oil Pioneers of Oklahoma Plaza at Sam Noble Museum at the University of Oklahoma in Norman, Oklahoma.
