= E. W. Marland Mansion =

Historic house in Oklahoma, United States

- Ernest Whitworth Marland Mansion
- U.S. National Register of Historic Places
- U.S. National Historic Landmark
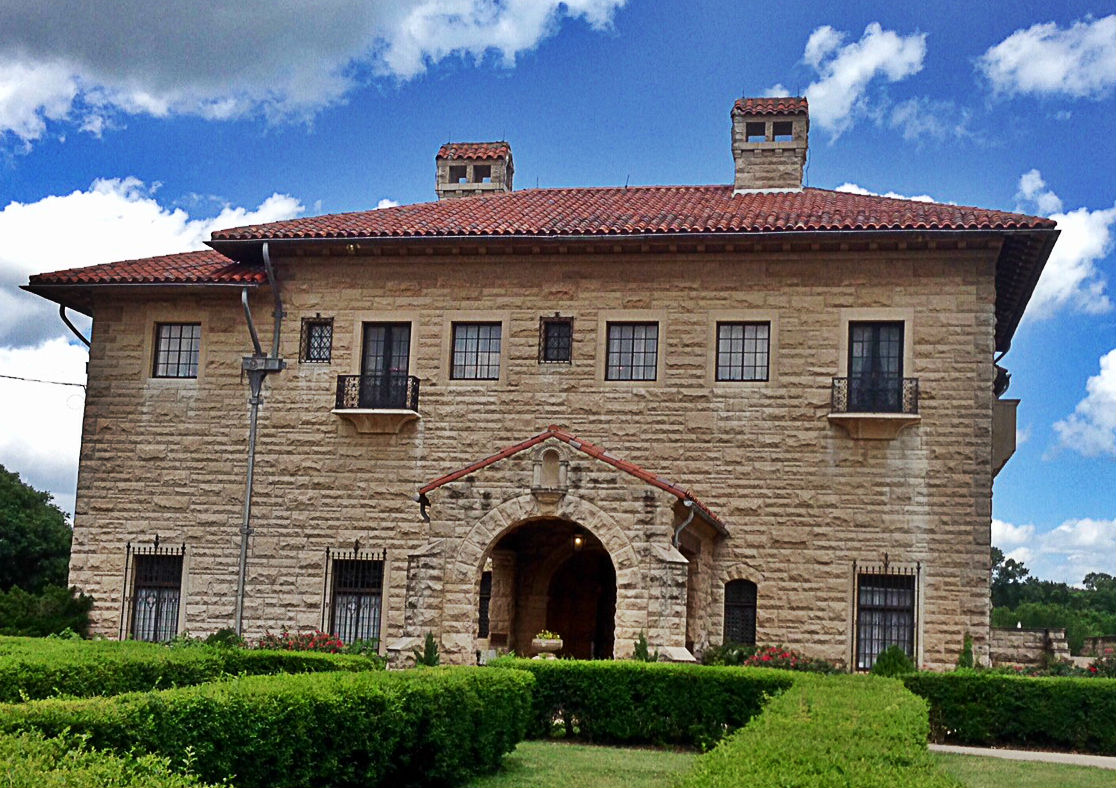
- Marland Mansion Western Entrance Front

- Location within Oklahoma Location within the United States
- Location: 901 Monument Rd., Ponca City, Oklahoma
- Coordinates: 36°43′01″N 97°03′38″W
- Built: 1928
- Architect: John Duncan Forsyth
- Architectural style: Mediterranean Revival
- NRHP reference No.: 73001561

Significant dates
- Added to NRHP: April 11, 1973
- Designated NHL: December 22, 1977

The E.W. Marland Mansion is a 43,561 square feet (4,046.9 m^{2}) Mediterranean Revival-style mansion located in Ponca City, Oklahoma, United States. Built by oil baron and philanthropist Ernest Whitworth (E.W.) Marland, as a display of wealth at the peak of the 1920s oil boom, the house is one of the largest residences in the southwestern United States, and is known as the "Palace on the Prairie." It was designated a National Historic Landmark in 1973, and is now a museum open to the public.

== Architecture ==
The Marland Mansion was built on the side of a small hill, higher on the west side than on the east, in an abandoned stone quarry that determined the placement for the mansion, as the excavations for the quarry was used for the construction of the swimming pool. Designed by prominent Tulsa architect John Duncan Forsyth, the mansion was constructed between 1925 and 1928, and influenced by the Palazzo Davanzati in Florence, Italy that Marland had visited while traveling in Europe. Crafted from light-colored, rusticated limestone blocks, quarried on-site, and set in concrete on a steel frame, the roughly u-shaped layout is 78 feet wide and 184 feet long. The main entrance is found on the west front and features an arched and buttressed porte-cochère with gabled, clay tiled roof, that shelters the arched, 11-panel, double wood entrance doors custom-made in New York. Under each of the four inside corners of the porte-cochère are sculptures of Marland's four hunting dogs, carved by Italian sculptor, Ernest G. Pellegrini. The windows with black painted metal surrounds, to contrast with the light colored stone, are asymmetrically arranged. The first level windows feature wrought iron grill work, while those on the second level are smaller, or have wrought iron balconies.

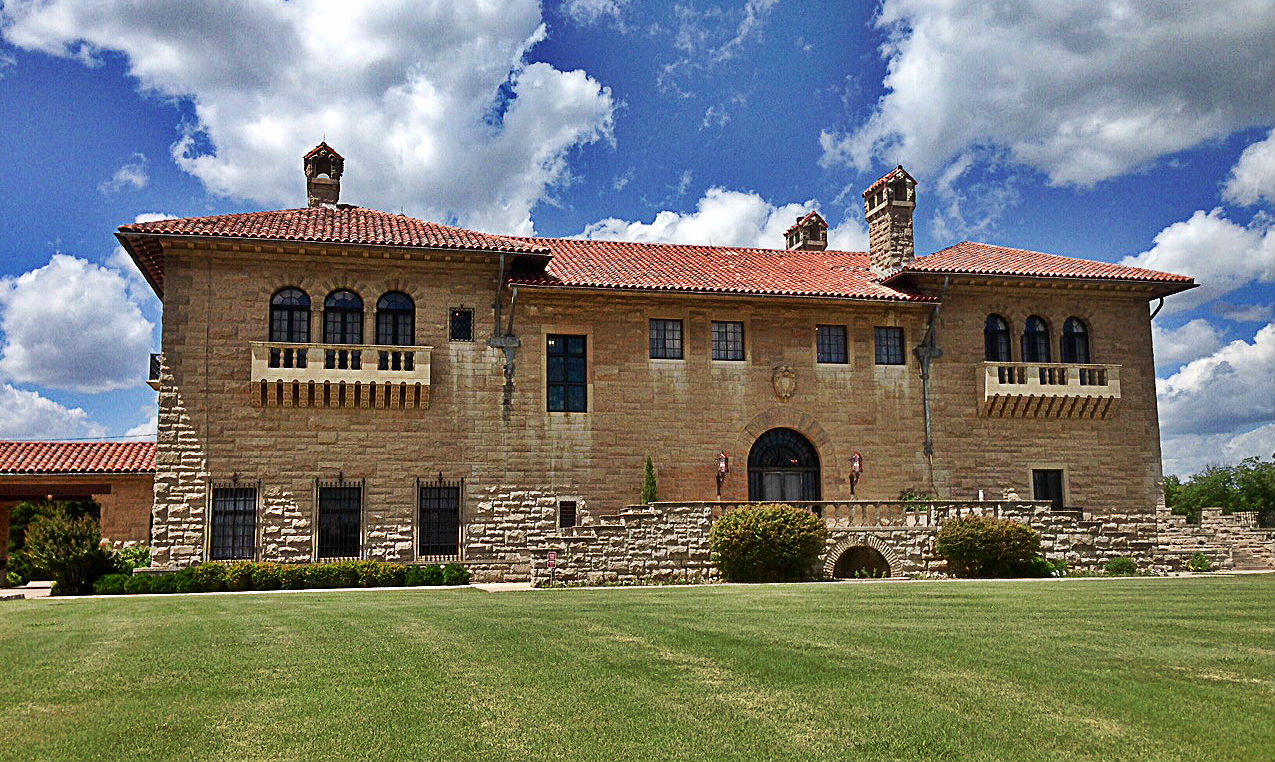
Marland Mansion South Front

Large raised terraces are found on the north, south and east fronts, however they do not interconnect. The south front's notable features include triple arched windows giving an arcaded effect and accented with stone balconies with flower carved corbels that flank the facade on the upper level. The drainage system is also exposed and displays the Marland monogram and the date "1927." The water from the system drains through a sculptured carving of Pan into a water feature located in a niche in the side of the terrace wall. Giving access to the terrace is a semicircular arched glass and wrought iron double doorway. The fanlight features a sunburst pattern with the tracery continuing down into the sidelights and doors with vertical bars. The arched doorway is replicated on the north facade in a set of three, continuing the arcaded effect. This arcade is highlighted by a stone cantilevered staircase to the left, with ornately carved corbels of mythological creatures leading to a second floor balcony adjacent to E.W. Marland's quarters. The east front is the only one that features a symmetrical facade, and where all three stories are evident due to the house being built on a hill. The first level has a set of three arched doorways that enclose a lounge directly below a terrace found on the second level, centered by a single arched entryway. On the third level are flanking rectangular windows with wrought iron balconies, mirroring those on the west front, centered by three small square shaped fenestrations.

The overhanging hipped roof, with stone corbeling along the roof line, features red clay tiles pierced by five large stone chimneys topped with Mediterranean style chimney caps. There was a sixth chimney situated on the north side of the house towards the rear that was destroyed in a storm and never rebuilt.

== Interior ==
=== First floor ===
The mansion is spread out over three floors featuring a total of 55 rooms, including 10 bedrooms, 12 bathrooms, 7 fireplaces, and 3 kitchens illuminated by 861 light bulbs. The layout of the house is generally a central hall plan, and as a result of being built on the side of a hill, the entrance hall is located on the second floor. Defining the space is a large stone arch flanked by two lower rectangular openings, through which a short flight of stairs lead to a landing behind the arch featuring a balustrade. Overhead are gilded domed ceilings, and the space is embellished with two stone carved night owls, peering out of the stairway niches through glowing red eyes. Below the arch, a grand stairway leads down to the first level, and to the Hall of Merriment. The hall is named due to the four whimsical carvings of men representing "Eat, drink and be merry," with the fourth figure taking a pinch of snuff. The hall today is the site of the Carl and Carolyn Renfro Gallery that feature replicas of the twelve statues entered in a competition to depict the Pioneer Woman.

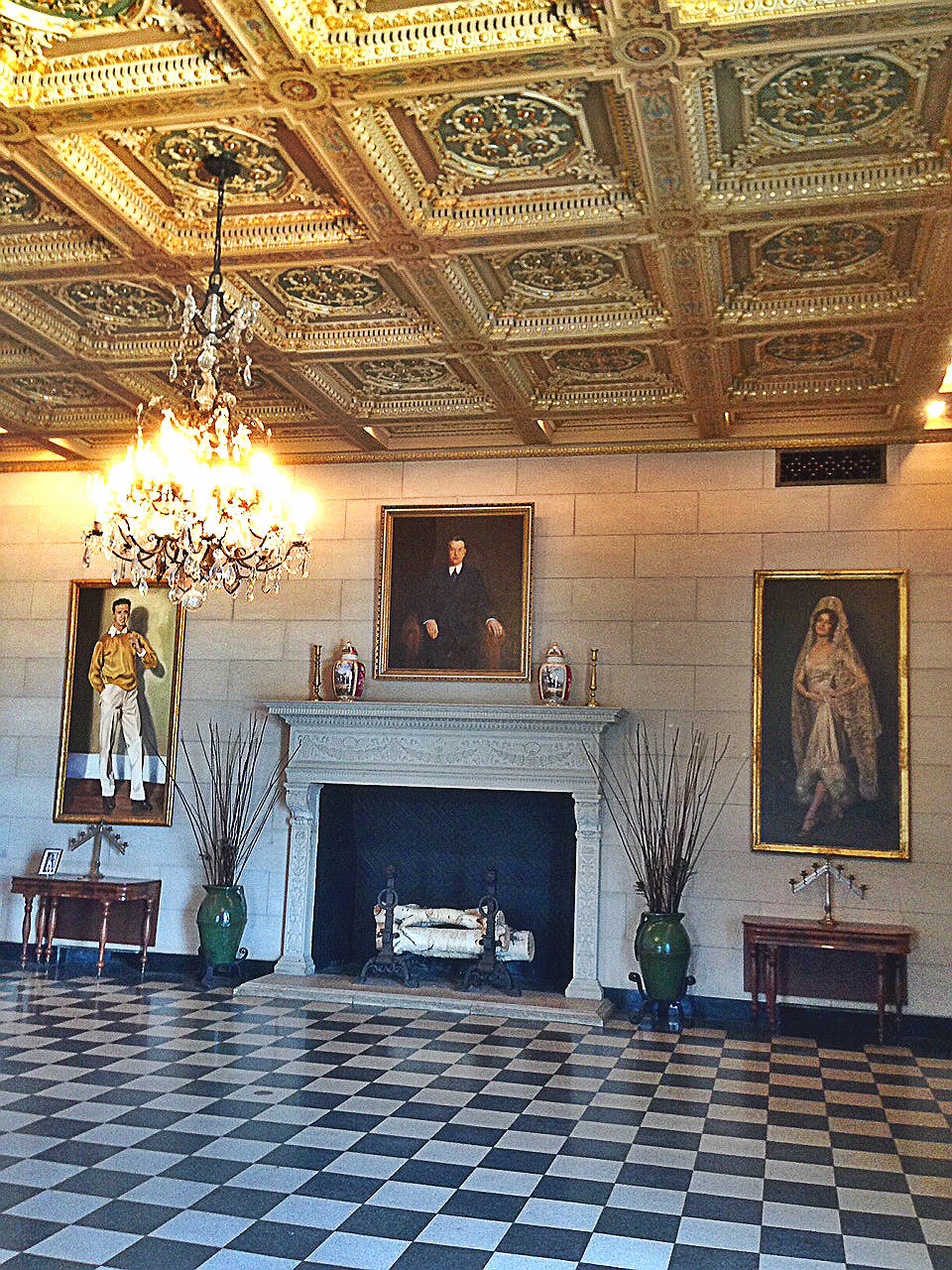
Marland Mansion Ballroom

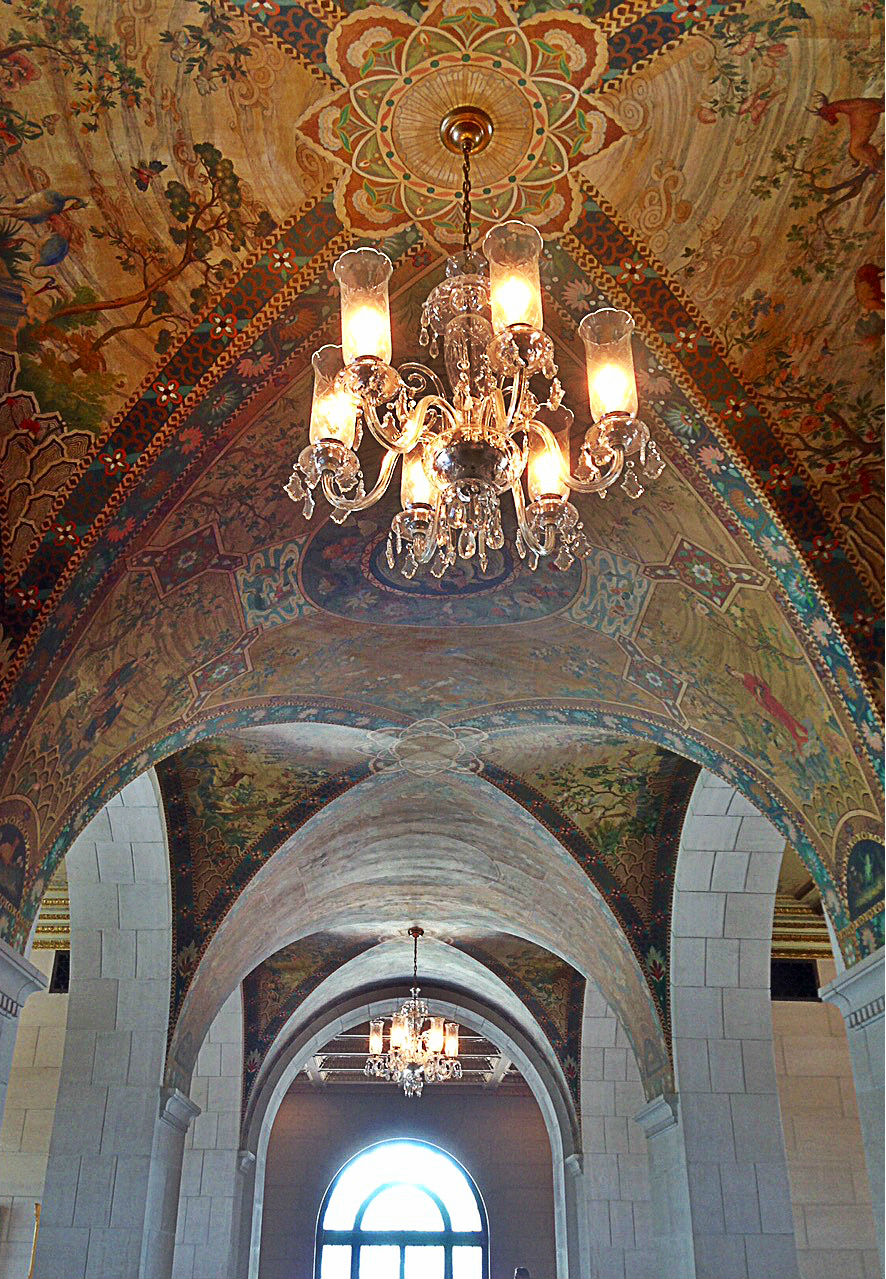
Marland Mansion Loggia

To the left of the hall is the service area of the house including the main kitchen where a majority of the cooking was done, the staff dining room and pantry. On the right was originally a handball court for the amusement of family and friends, but has been re-purposed as the administrative offices for the Estate and the National Petroleum Hall of Fame. At the far eastern side of the house are two lounges, the inner lounge known as the Winter Room, and the outer lounge known as the Summer Room. The Winter Room has a large fireplace with a hearth that hides a small entry to a panic room that could have been used by the family during any dangerous situations. Above the concrete beams of the ceiling are decorated with artwork tracing the history of Oklahoma from the days of the pre-Columbian Native Americans through the discovery of oil by Marland Oil Company. The third kitchen is also located in this room and is known as the Hunt Kitchen as this is where guest assembled for breakfast before the fox hunts. Adjacent to the Hunt Kitchen is the secret Poker Room that concealed a hidden Whiskey Room and door to the 550 foot tunnel leading to the Boat House and Artist Studio. The ceilings in the Summer Lounge were designed and painted by Vincent Maragliotti free of charge and pay homage to the spirit of the 1920s.

=== Second floor ===
The principal rooms of the house are located on the second floor. To the left of the entrance hall is the Elizabethan formal dining room featuring wall panels of hand-cut pollard oak cut from an English royal forest, as well as a suspended cast plaster barrel ceiling that was molded at bench level, and then hoisted and wired into position to the structural beams. Adjacent to the dining room is a small octagonal-shaped breakfast room with plaster work representing the Tree of Life on the walls, and a service kitchen that featured once state-of-the-art appliances and counters made of Monel.

Accessed by a curved double staircase in the entrance hall, a multiple arched loggia with vaulted ceilings, featuring hand painted chinoiserie canvases, and a terrazzo floor with each tile individually poured between brass dividers, runs through the center of the house to the ballroom. Flanking the loggia are the sun room and living room where Marland displayed his collection of tapestries, paintings and works of art. The spacious ballroom features an ornate coffered ceiling that was gilded in $80,000 of gold leaf, and lit from imported Waterford crystal chandeliers with wrought iron bases that originally cost $15,000 each. To replace the ceiling and chandeliers today would cost an estimated $2 million. On the north wall are family portraits surrounding a large fireplace.

=== Third floor ===
The third floor, where the family's private quarters are found, is accessed by a spacious stone staircase with wrought iron railings, or by the original Otis elevator lined with buffalo leather; one of the first to be installed in the state of Oklahoma. E.W. Marland's wood paneled bedroom was done in the English Tudor-style, and features a carved wood mantel with two of Marland's favorite polo mounts. The room is filled with many original pieces of furniture that have been returned to the house over the years. The connecting bathroom includes an electric sauna, believed to be one of the first in the United States. The library was Marland's private study and was the headquarters for his campaign when running for the office of Governor of Oklahoma. Noteworthy in this room are the bookshelves that are topped with giant seashell designs, replicas of those found in the Oval Office of the White House. The Louis XV-style bedroom of his wife, Lydie Marland, is lined with imported lime-wood hand-carved panels with rounded corners, and a fireplace carved from Italian pink marble. There are a number of guest suites and bedrooms on this floor as well, including one named after Will Rogers where it is believed he stayed during his visits to the mansion.

== Grounds ==
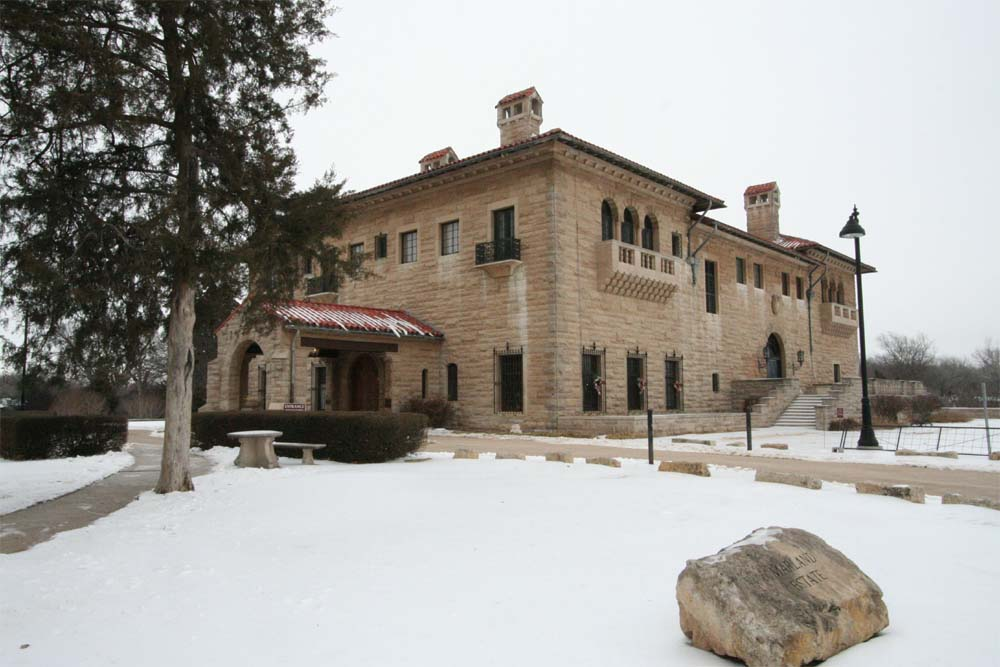

The grounds of the Marland Mansion are currently composed of 30 acres (12 ha) of gardens, lakes and ancillary buildings spread throughout the estate. The original buildings were designed to complement the main house with rough-hewn stone facades and red clay tile roofs. Lydie's Cottage was originally the chauffeur's quarters with garage space attached for the Marland's carriages and cars. Several architectural elements used in the mansion can be found in the cottage including a wood beam ceiling and a fish-scale stone floor in the entry. The house was remodeled by Forsyth with the addition of a bedroom and bathroom in the former carriage area, and the Marlands moved-in upon the sale of the mansion in 1941. E.W. Marland died here six months later of a heart condition, while Lydie Marland continued to live in the house, off and on, until her death in 1987. The cottage today contains the Marland Family Exhibit, that includes photos and artifacts from the family's presence in Pennsylvania and Oklahoma.

South of the cottage, is the Artist Studio featuring a two-story peaked roof structure on the south and north, with two one-story galleries and an arched walkway in between. Built for Jo Davidson, sculptor of the Marland family statues, the beams of the studio were recycled from one of Marland's first oil derricks. The south wing houses the Bryant Baker Gallery featuring 44 bronze and plaster maquettes and busts of Bryant Baker's work. Bryant Baker was the sculptor of the Pioneer Woman Statue, which was commissioned by Marland and is located in Ponca City. Also, a room in the gallery displays information and drawings of the architect, John Duncan Forsyth, who designed the estate, as well as many other homes in Ponca City and Tulsa. The Oil Museum is located in the north wing of the Artist Studio and showcases the history of the Marland Oil Company in the early 20th-century. The studio is connected to the mansion by a tunnel via the Boat House.

The Boat House is the location of a large underground wine cellar that is accessed by a safe door. It also functioned as a storage area for the boats that were used for the enjoyment of guest and family. Once on the edge of one of five lakes on the estate, this body of water along with three other lakes, and the T-shaped Olympic-sized pool, were filled in by a successive owner. Lake Whitemarsh is the only remaining lake, and named after Marland's yacht, which in turn was named for a lake in Marland's hometown of Pittsburgh, Pennsylvania.

== History ==
At the height of the 1920s oil boom, E.W. Marland who controlled one tenth of the world's oil, set about building a home that was befitting of his new station in life. The mansion was built on a 2,500 acres (1,000 ha) estate on the edge of town, and named The Refuge by Marland. Construction of the house began in 1925, employing dozens of European craftsmen, and was completed in 1928 at a cost of $5.5 million. Artwork and antique furnishings were purchased from around the world to fill the large mansion and gardens including French limestone sculptures of the family.

E.W. Marland opened his estate on June 2, 1928, to invited friends and family, who enjoyed a luncheon and an afternoon of equestrian events such as polo and fox hunting which he had introduced to Oklahoma. Due to a hostile takeover of his company in 1928 by J. P. Morgan Jr., the Marlands only enjoyed living in the mansion until 1931, as the operation of the large dwelling depleted their much reduced finances. Moving into the Artist Studio on the estate, the mansion was only opened for special occasions, such as the Inaugural Ball to celebrate Marland becoming Oklahoma's 10th governor in 1935. Just six months prior to his death, Marland sold the estate to the Discalced Carmelite Fathers in 1941 for just $66,000. Marland kept the former chauffeur cottage and surrounding land, leaving them to Lydie in his will.

In 1948, the Fathers sold the estate to the Sisters of St. Felix who operated a private high school on the grounds. During their tenure, they built a number of structures on the grounds, though all have been removed except for Angela Hall, built in 1958, and still operating as a school. The Felician Sisters moved to New Mexico in 1975, and sold the estate to the City of Ponca City and Continental Oil Company, which transferred their partial ownership to the city, for $1.5 million. The mansion was opened to the public the following year, and since then has undergone continued renovation to restore the estate to its former grandeur.

It was declared a National Historic Landmark in 1977.

== See also ==
- List of largest houses in the United States
