= Alfred Marland =

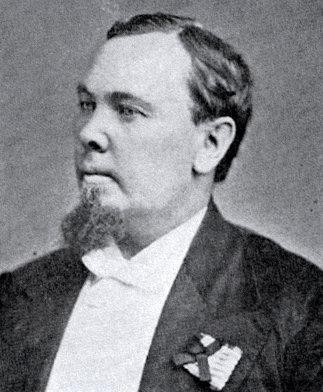
- An undated photo of Marland from around 1890

Member of the Pennsylvania House of Representatives from the Allegheny County district
- In office 1889–1890

Personal details
- Born: March 2, 1837 Ashton-Under-Lyne, England, United Kingdom
- Died: April 2, 1914 (aged 77) Ponca City, Oklahoma, United States
- Party: Republican
- Children: E. W. Marland

Alfred Henry Marland (March 2, 1837 – April 2, 1914) was an American politician who served in the Pennsylvania House of Representatives from 1889 to 1890. He was the father of Oklahoma Governor E. W. Marland.

== Biography ==
Alfred Henry Marland on March 2, 1837 at Ashton-Under-Lyne in England. He worked as an engineer at a cotton factory, as a machinist, for the Standard Nut Company and was a partner in Marland, Neely, and Co., a machine parts manufacturer. He served on the Pittsburgh City Council representing the 32nd ward. He was elected to the Pennsylvania House of Representatives as a Republican in 1888 and from 1889 to 1890 represented Allegheny County. He unsuccessfully campaigned for reelection in 1892. He died on April 2, 1914, in Ponca City, Oklahoma, and was buried in Mt. Lebanon Cemetery in Pittsburg. He was the father of E. W. Marland.
