= John Duncan Forsyth =

Scottish-American architect (1886/87 - 1963)

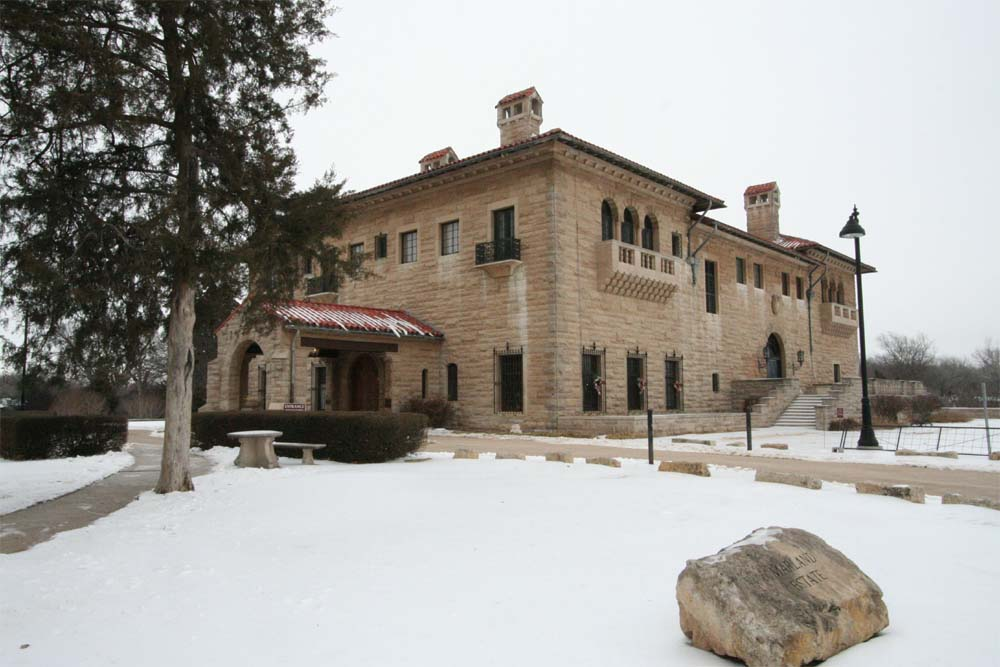
The E. W. Marland Mansion

John Duncan Forsyth (1886 or 1887–1963) was a Scottish-American architect who became prominent in Oklahoma. Based in Tulsa and working in a variety of styles, he was connected with a number of significant buildings around the state.

== Biography ==
According to one source, Forsyth was born in 1886 in Florence, Italy; another source says he was born in 1887 in Kingskettle, Fife, Scotland. He was raised in Scotland and studied at Edinburgh College, and at the Sorbonne and L’Ecole des Beaux-Arts in Paris.

He immigrated to the United States in 1908. He was a member of the large team of architects who worked on Central Union Station (now the Government Conference Centre) in Ottawa, Ontario. He trained with various architects, including John Russell Pope. during World War I, he fought with the Royal Flying Corps.

In 1921 Forsyth moved to Tulsa, Oklahoma, where he became associated with Tulsa architect John McDonnell He received his Oklahoma architect's license in 1925. Soon he was hired for what became one of his most famous buildings, the E. W. Marland Mansion in Ponca City. The Marland mansion, which is operated as a museum, includes a room dedicated to Forsyth's work.

Forsyth maintained a prolific practice. During World War II, he left Oklahoma to serve with the U.S. Navy Seabees in California and worked there after the war. During the late 1940s and early 1950s, Forsyth was active in San Clemente, California, where he contributed to residential and civic development. Contemporary issues of the Sun Post News document Forsyth’s involvement in local building activity during this period, including residential designs and participation in postwar construction projects. His work formed part of the broader expansion of San Clemente following World War II . In the late 1950s, he returned to Tulsa. He had been married a total of six times. Forsyth remained in Tulsa until his death in 1963.

In 2007, John Brooks Walton, a Tulsa architect who had worked for Forsyth, published a biography entitled The Art and Architecture of John Duncan Forsyth.

== Projects ==
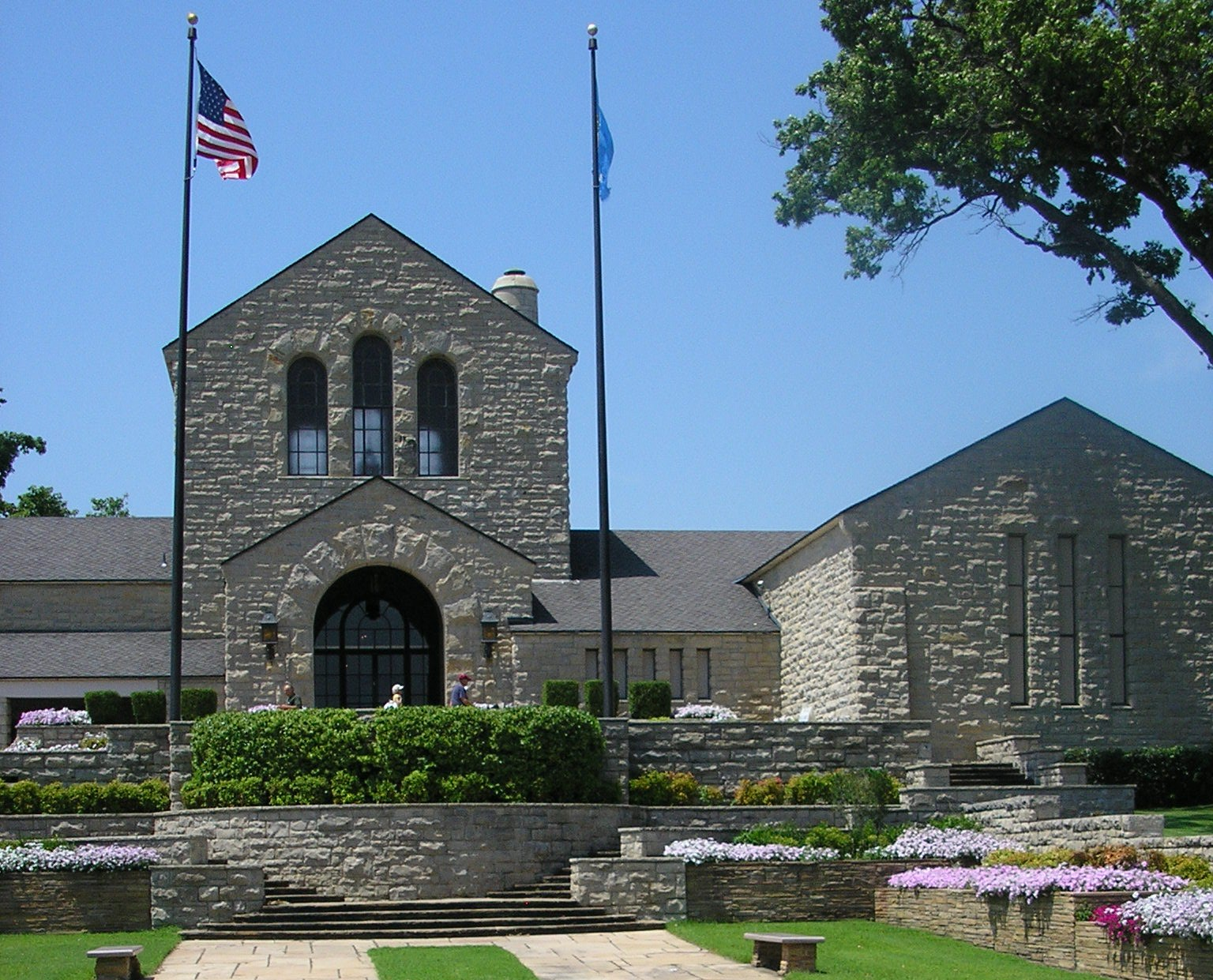
Will Rogers Memorial, Claremore, Oklahoma

- E. W. Marland Mansion (1928), 901 Monument Road in Ponca City, Oklahoma NRHP listed.
- Royalty Building (1929), built by oilman E. W. Marland, a mission style architecture building on 4th & East Grand Avenue in Ponca City with retail space on the lower floors and office space above for E. W. Marland and the E. W. Marland Co. It was purchased from Marland in the 1940s and "is now owned by the Donahoes".The royalty building was purchased by Kevin and Tracy Emmons in early 2018.
- Lamerton House (1930) at 1420 W. Indian Drive in Enid, Oklahoma, built in Tudor Revival style. NRHP listed #97000613.
- H. F. Wilcox Estate (1931), 1351 E. 27th Place, Tulsa, designed in "Elizabethan style".
- Southern Hills Country Club clubhouse (1936), Tulsa (J.D. Forsyth and Donald McCormick, associate architects), designed in the "European country house style".
- John Duncan Forsyth Residence (1937, restored 1985), built in Streamline Moderne style.
- Will Rogers Memorial (1938), a stone museum and memorial to Oklahoma humorist Will Rogers, built on a hill overlooking Claremore, Oklahoma, later substantially expanded.
- Daniel Webster High School (1938), a PWA-style Art Deco building in West Tulsa (Arthur M. Atkinson, John Duncan Forsyth, Raymond Kerr, and William H. Wolaver, architects).
- Bartlesville High School (originally College High School) (1939), a Streamline Moderne school in Bartlesville, Oklahoma.

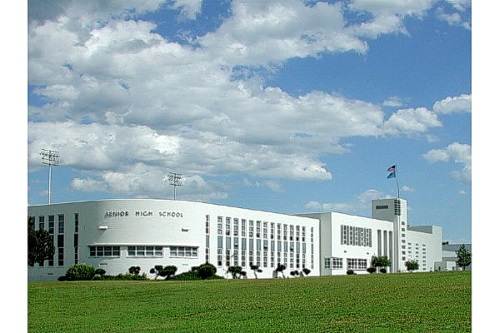
Bartlesville High School

- Pensacola Dam (1938–1940) at Grand Lake o' the Cherokees in Langley, Oklahoma. Listed on the NRHP for Mayes County, Oklahoma. As architect of record, Forsyth was responsible for the PWA-style Art Deco design features of this structure, claimed to be the world's longest multiple arch dam.
- Jane Addams Hall (1940) at the University of Science and Arts of Oklahoma in Chickasha, part of the Oklahoma College for Women Historic District, a collection of PWA buildings designed by different prominent Oklahoma architects.
- All Souls Unitarian Church (1957) in Tulsa, one of the largest Unitarian Universalist congregations in the world.
- B.B. Blair Mansion (1958) a Southern plantation style home adjoining the Arkansas River in Tulsa, inspired by Beauvoir, the Mississippi home of Jefferson Davis (demolished in February 2014 to make way for a park).
