= Marland Oil Company =

American oil company

- Type: Private
- Industry: Petroleum
- Founded: January 3, 1921
- Founder: E. W. Marland
- Defunct: June 26, 1929
- Fate: Merged with Conoco
- Headquarters: Ponca City, Oklahoma

Marland Oil Company was an American integrated petroleum company that existed from 1921 to 1929. The company was founded by Ernest Whitworth Marland (1874–1941) and was based in Ponca City, Oklahoma.

Originally operating in Oklahoma, Marland Oil Co. expanded its operations to Texas, Colorado, California, Mexico, and even Central and South America. In 1929 Marland Oil merged with the Continental Oil Company ("Conoco") by purchasing it, retaining the name "Continental Oil".

== History ==
The company was founded in 1917, by E. W. Marland, Ponca City, Oklahoma oil exploration pioneer, when he assembled his various holdings including the 101 Ranch Oil Company into one unit. By 1920 it is estimated that Marland and his partners controlled 10% of the world's oil production (the equivalent of Saudi Arabia in 2006) and that Marland was worth US$85 million (equivalent to about $1.366 billion in 2025).

On January 3, 1921, Marland incorporated the "Marland Oil Company" in Delaware to acquire through an exchange of stock control of the Marland Refining Corp. and Kay County Gas Co. The company consolidated its growth acquired several small oil companies such as Comar Oil Company, Tom Jones Oil Company, Kenney-Cleary Oil Company, Francoma Oil Company, John S. Alcorn Oil Company, among others.

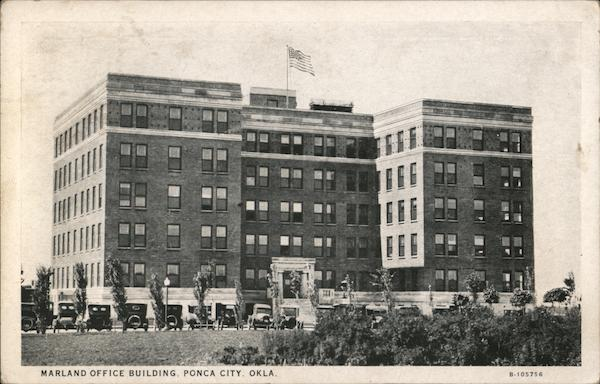
Marland Oil Building, Ponca City

Talks began with the Continental Oil Company along these lines in late 1928. In the meantime, Marland Oil had acquired Baltimore based Prudential Refining, since a refinery with East Coast marketing access would serve as a processing outlet for Marland's crude oil production. A merger with Continental would facilitate the Baltimore facility to supply Continental's existing Mid-Atlantic marketing efforts, allowing for substantial growth in the number of retail service stations and the increased cash flow related to that increase in sales. On June 26, 1929 the merger was approved, and it acquired for a consideration of 2,317,266 shares of stock, the assets (subject to liabilities) of Continental Oil Company.
