= Ben Lilly =

American big game hunter & mountain man (1856–1936)

Benjamin Vernon Lilly, Ben Lilly
- Born: Winter of 1856; Wilcox County, Alabama
- Died: Dec 17, 1936; Silver City, New Mexico
- Occupations: Big game hunter, trapper, mountain man, hunting guide, writer, blacksmith, houndsman, predator control agent, pioneer, rancher.
- Title: Ol' Lilly, Old Man Lilly
- Spouse(s): Lelia Lilly, Mary Lilly

Benjamin Vernon Lilly or Ben Lilly (1856 – December 17, 1936), nicknamed Ol' Lilly, was a notorious big game hunter, houndsman and mountain man of the late American Old West. He remains famous for hunting down large numbers of grizzly, cougars and black bears. A mix between a transcendentalist spirit and an ardent Christian, he is described as an unfathomable Southern wild character. He was a stern practitioner of simple living and outdoor freedom, roamed and hunted from Louisiana to Arizona and from Idaho to as far south as Chihuahua and Durango, Mexico, and was a subject of American folktales. He guided on hunting expeditions oiler W. H. McFadden and President Theodore Roosevelt, whom he intrigued and who wrote about him. He was arguably the most prolific hunter of apex predators in the history of North American hunting and also the last active mountain man of the historical American Southwest. He was not a conservationist but made important contributions of fauna specimens and naturalistic observations to American institutions and museums. He was a contradictory character and his exploits have been consistently exaggerated to folktale proportions, and most records are oral, bona-fide, Americana transcripts.

== Personal life ==
Lilly was born in the winter of 1856 in Wilcox County, Alabama of parents from North Carolina. His family moved from Alabama to Kemper County, Mississippi when he was young and he spent most of his childhood there, being raised as a devout Christian. After the end of the American Civil War, at twelve, he was sent by his parents to a military academy in Jackson, Mississippi, but ran away. His whereabouts were not known to his family for a long time, until his uncle, Vernon Lilly, by chance discovered him running a blacksmith shop in Memphis, TN. His uncle, a "planter" from Morehouse Parish, Louisiana, offered Lilly a job, and he accepted. After his uncle's death, he inherited the cotton farm, and there, in 1880, he married his first wife, Lelia, whom he not so affectionately referred to as "daughter of Sodom and Gomorrah". He did no pursue his blacksmith career for long; but later he used these skills to fashion his hunting knives and traps. In Louisiana, he discovered his passion for big-game hunting after killing a black bear with a knife, and started relentlessly pursuing hunting as a career for the rest of his life. At first, he was making an income selling bear meat and wild honey. Then he moved to east Texas, in the Big Thicket and lived for three years around 1904–1907 in the hunting camp of Ben Hook, with whom he partnered. In 1907, he guided President Theodore Roosevelt, as chief huntsman, in a big game hunting expedition in Tensas Bayou, Louisiana. Roosevelt wrote about Ben Lilly:

I never met any other man so indifferent to fatigue and hardship. The morning he joined us in camp, he had come on foot through the thick woods, followed by his two dogs, and had neither eaten nor drunk for twenty-four hours; for he did not like to drink the swamp water. It had rained hard throughout the night and he had no shelter, no rubber coat, nothing but the clothes he was wearing and the ground was too wet for him to lie on, so he perched in a crooked tree in the beating rain, much as if he had been a wild turkey. He equaled Cooper's Deerslayer in woodcraft, in hardihood, in simplicity–and also in loquacity.

Lilly was 5'9" tall and around 180 lbs, and known for the strength and stamina that stayed with him until old age, "spare, full bearded, with mild, gentle eyes and a frame of steel and whipcord." In his convictions, Ben Lilly did not smoke nor drink alcohol or coffee, facts that set him apart from the rest of his contemporaries. He was, however, fond of eating bear and particularly cougar meat, which, he believed, in a similar fashion to syncretic Native American ideas, would give him feline powers. He was one of the most accomplished houndsmen at the time in North America, and was strict but fond of his packs of hounds, mostly Southern catahoula and coonhound breeds. In 1908, he crossed into Mexico, to Chihuahua, and then took to the Sierra Madre mountains, in western Coahuila, where he hunted grizzly and became the source of local tales, notably the one of him pursuing a menacing large grizzly that sported a white star and terrorized locals of Camino Real. A description of a grizzly hunt while in Coahuila, Mexico, narrated personally by him remains:

Old man Sanborn set me on him. They was grizzlies, four of them, and I tracked them down by myself and killed them. They was desert bears, light colored with a stripe down their back, but desert or mountain they didn't get away and I killed the four of them, brought their skins back to Sanborn.

He crossed back into US and settled in Gila Wilderness, New Mexico, and starting in 1911 was employed by the government and local cattle ranchers for killing predators, earning the most money in his lifetime. He is credited with killing the last wild grizzly in the vast Gila Wilderness. In 1912 he was registered as hunter and trapper for the Apache National Forest in Arizona, living near Clifton and earning $75 a month. Between 1916 and 1920 he was employed full-time by the U.S. Biological Survey. The ties with the agency started in 1904, when at 50 years old, he began sending specimens of the animals he hunted and trapped to the collections of U.S. Biological Survey, today's U.S. Fish and Wildlife Service, and the National Museum of Natural History, Washington D.C., through the care of his friend, Ned Hollister. Those specimens included mountain lions, brown and black bears, deer, otter, and rare animals like the Mexican gray wolf or ivory-billed woodpecker. The most famous of these specimens went to the Smithsonian Institution, and was a record grizzly hunted in northeast Arizona. On occasion, he captured mountain lion cubs and raised them to full maturity, not as pets, but to observe their habits. In 1921, Ben acted as guide for Oklahoma oil tycoon W. H. McFadden on his memorable hunt through the Rocky Mountains, from Mexico to Canada. For some reason, Lilly left the party in Idaho and did not finish the trip to Canada. For fifteen years, from 1911 to 1926 between Ben's fifty-fifth and seventieth years, he reached his goal of hunting every day of the year, except Sundays. By hunting all bears and cougars, Benjamin Vernon Lilly held the personal belief that he was in a sacred mission for the extermination of "malefic creatures" and spared no effort in doing so. He was no doubt, one of the most destructive individuals contributing to the reduction of North American apex predators to the brink of extinction, an act contrary to modern standards of both ethical hunting and wildlife conservation. The numbers of animals killed by Ben Lilly in his exploits are disputed, but it is estimated that he killed between 600 and 1000 mountain lions in his lifetime. An epitaph that Ben Lilly wrote on the box in which he buried one of his most prized hounds in 1925, near Sapillo Creek, New Mexico, read:

Here lies Crook, a bear and lion dog that helped kill 210 bear and 426 lion since 1914 (n.n. 11 years period), owned by B. V. Lilly ...

He was known many times to fight and dispatch in hand-to-hand combat bear and cougars using a self-made custom Bowie knife, more precisely a double edged S-shaped large Arkansas toothpick dagger, named "The Lilly Knife". For the rest he was an accomplished marksman and used Winchester lever-action rifles, a .30-30 for cougars and a .33 Winchester (.33 WCF) caliber for bears. He died at eighty, on December 17, 1936, on a ranch in Pleasanton, near Silver City, New Mexico and is buried in the historic Memory Lane Cemetery in Silver City. His modest tombstone bears the epitaph: "Lover of the Great Outdoors". In 1947 the last people who knew him erected a bronze plaque to his memory, on Bear Creek, Pinos Altos, New Mexico.

=== Peculiarities, humor and quotes ===
In one well known account, his wife sent him to shoot a chicken-hawk that was bothering the birds around their home. Then he went missing for almost two years, and upon his return, when asked what happened, he gave the laconic answer: "That hawk just kept flying!"

Quotes from Benjamin Vernon Lilly are sometimes shocking by today's standards, many completed with Southern humor:

Anyone can kill a deer but it takes a man to kill a varmint.

by varmints he meant bears, mountain lions, and wolves.

Property is a handicap to man.

I never saw a man with his face shaved clean until I was a big boy. When I saw him I thought he was a dead man ... walking about, and I was mighty scared.

Ben Lilly to a rogue bear, prior to dispatching him with a Bowie knife:

You are condemned, you black devil, I kill you in the name of the law!

Another time, he said:

My reputation is bigger than I am. It is like my shadow when I stand in front of the sun in late evening.

=== Bibliography ===
Books

- The Ben Lilly Legend, by J. Frank Dobbie, 1997, 5th printing. Publisher: University Of Texas Press, TX, USA. ISBN 0292707282
- Tales From The Big Thicket, by Francis E. Ebernethy. University Of North Texas Press, TX, USA. ISBN 1-57441-142-X
- Hunting American Lions, by Dr. Frank C. Hibben, 1948. Publisher: The Cornwall Press Inc., NY, USA. ISBN 0-944383-25-4
- Hunting American Bears, by Dr. Frank C. Hibben. Publisher: High-Lonesome Books, 1997, Silver City, NM, USA. ISBN 0944383378
- The Bear Hunter's Century. Profiles From The Golden Age Of Bear Hunting, by Paul Schullery, 1988, 2nd printing. Publisher: Stackpole, Harrisburg, PA, USA. ISBN 081170209X
- Man And Bear, Adventures in the Wild, by Jack Samson

Articles

- Ben Lilly: Bears, Blades & Contradictions, by Jesse Wolf Hardin
- Ben Lilly and the Last Of Bears, by Dan C. Johnson
