= John McCaskey =

John McCaskey may refer to:

- John G. McCaskey, American oil businessman
- John Piersol McCaskey, American educator, politician, and textbook and songbook editor
