= Herbert Andrews =

Herbert Andrews may refer to:

- Hub Andrews (Herbert Carl Andrews, 1922–2012), baseball player
- Herbert Kennedy Andrews (1904–1965), British composer and organist
