= Cann Memorial Botanical Gardens =

Botanical gardens in Ponca City, Oklahoma, United States

Coordinates: 36°42′10″N 97°03′55″W

- Interactive map of Cann Memorial Botanical Gardens
- Type: Botanical garden
- Location: Ponca City, Oklahoma
- Area: 10 acres (4.0 ha)
- Open: Open 7 days a week
- Website: Official website

The Cann Memorial Botanical Gardens 10 acres (4.0 ha) are botanical gardens located at 1500 East Grand Avenue, Ponca City, Oklahoma, United States.

In 1975 the Lester A. Cann private home (circa 1908) and gardens were donated to Ponca City by Elsie Cann Brown, daughter of L.A. and Mary Cann. Lester A. Cann was a civic leader in Ponca City, serving over 25 years as a commissioner and City Manager. The estate was donated with the stipulation that it would be maintained as a memorial garden for the residents of Ponca City.

Workshops and seminars are held in the magnificent two-story prairie home. Renovations were completed in 1977, including 2,500 feet of brick walkways. Visitors may stroll under a wisteria arbor, past a gazebo, around a lily pond, and through beds of perennials, herbs and annuals. More than 70 species of trees have been planted since 1980.

The garden is open to visitors 7 days a week, and there is no charge for visiting. A garden employee is present on weekdays from 7:00 a.m. to 3:30 p.m. to answer questions concerning the plants, flowers, and trees in the garden.

Ponca City's Sage, Rosemary and Thyme Garden Club hosted an annual herb festival on the grounds of the Cann Memorial Botanical Gardens for over 15 years before turning the festival over to Ponca City Herb Festival Inc. in 2012 The festival has been operated by Domestic Violence of Ponca City since 2017. One of the region's premier events, the Ponca City Herb Festival was founded by SRT club member Mary Anne Potter in 1993. Attendance is estimated to average well over 10,000 according to former Herb Festival president Sherry Muchmore. The festival is held on the first Saturday in June each year. Plants, primitive bird houses, yard ornaments, potting sheds, quilts, herbal vinegars and oils, handmade baskets, candles, soaps, furniture, potpourris, stoneware, and much more are provided by over 100 vendors from Oklahoma, Texas, Kansas, Colorado and Arkansas.

== See also ==
- List of botanical gardens and arboretums in the United States
