= Ponca City Public Schools =

School district in Oklahoma

Ponca City Public Schools is the public school district in Ponca City, Oklahoma. It operates seven elementary schools, two middle schools (one serves grades 6 and 7 and the other serves grade 8), and Ponca City High School. It employs 760 people and has over 5,000 students. The entire school system shares the Wildcat mascot.

Most of the district is in Kay County, where it includes almost all of Ponca City, as well as White Eagle. Portions are in Osage and Noble counties.

== History ==
In 2002, Burbank School District 20, the school district of nearby Burbank, Oklahoma, voted to dissolve because of low enrollment. Some areas previously served by the district were taken over by Ponca City Public Schools.

== Schools ==
=== Ponca City High School ===
Ponca City High School

=== East Middle School ===
East Middle School (EMS) is located in the North Central Oklahoma town of Ponca City. Serving approximately 375 students per year, EMS is the 8th grade center for Ponca City Public Schools. School staff includes a Principal, one Assistant Principal, Counselor, a technology coordinator, 28 full and part-time certified teachers, Title 7 Coordinator, and 5 teachers aides. As a school-wide Title I site, EMS focuses great effort on improving Math and Reading levels. State standardized test scores show 80-90% of the students consistently performing at proficient or better in Math and 70-80% in Reading. Both of these are above the state average.

==== History of East Middle School ====
East Middle School sits on the site of Ponca City's original school building built in 1893. The original wooden school building burned and was replaced in 1911 with a native stone building. The 2nd building was condemned in 1938 and replaced with the current building in 1939 for a cost of $441,216.23. Ralph Lester was the buildings inaugural principal. The building's 1400 seat auditorium was later named in honor of Mr. Lester. The current moniker of East was acquired in 1961 when the school district opened another junior high on the west side of town. The current principal of East Middle School is Barbara Davis, and the motto is :"learning is the Only Option".

==== One-to-One Laptop School ====
The 1:1 Digital Classroom Project was funded under the American Recovery and Investment Act of 2009. Approximately 6.68 million dollars was set aside for innovative projects using 1:1 laptops, of which Ponca City received approximately $900,000. In the 2015-2016 school year, due to complaints about the laptops being too heavy to carry, Ponca City Public Schools received a 1:1 ratio of Chromebooks for East Middle School, and Ponca City High school, and lock carts with Chromebooks at the other schools, to replace the traditional laptops used the years before.

=== West Middle School ===
West Middle School first opened in 1945 as West Junior High School and served grades 7,8 and 9. It now serves 6th and 7th graders. It is located at 1401 West Grand Avenue. The current main Principal of West Middle School is Stacey Sattre.
