= John G. McCaskey =

American oil businessman

John Gruard McCaskey
- John Gruard McCaskey in 1917
- Born: July 3, 1874; Pittsburgh, Pennsylvania
- Died: January 12, 1924 (aged 49); Pittsburgh, Pennsylvania
- Spouse: Mary Florence Ashford McCaskey

John Gruard McCaskey (July 3, 1874 – January 12, 1924) was an American oil businessman.

== Early life ==
John Gruard McCaskey born in Pittsburgh, Pennsylvania on July 3, 1874, was an essential factor in opening up the oil fields of Oklahoma and Texas. By his early 30s McCaskey was President of The National Sauerkraut Association, had become a self made millionaire and won for himself the cognomen of "the Sauerkraut King" after his friend E. W. Marland arranged for a contract with the farmers of Dutchess County, New York, giving McCaskey an option for the annual cabbage crop. From this he had built an extensive commercial enterprise, owning a large number of factories making sauerkraut in Ohio, Pennsylvania (the SnowFloss brand) and New York (the Seneca Kraut and Pickling Company). Controlling two-thirds of the U.S. market for this product, it was the largest in America. It was from this base that he chose to engage in the new oil business on a large scale, founding a number of oil companies in Oklahoma and Texas.

== Oil business ventures ==
His initial oil venture started with a young manhood friend, E. W. Marland. In 1908 McCaskey became an investor and a director of the 101 Ranch Oil Company of Ponca City founded by Marland to explore for Oklahoma oil. By 1910 however, the company was on the verge of failure having run out of money and only having found natural gas. McCaskey reorganized the company, was elected president and associating his activities with Pittsburgh capital he raised funds from W. H. McFadden, retired President of Mackintosh, Hemphill & Co. a Pittsburgh rolling mill manufacturer who was elected vice president, general manager and J. M. Weaver, who was elected treasurer. A drilling lease was obtained on the Willie Cry Ponca Indian allotment and on June 11, 1911 the well "Willy-Cries-For-War" struck oil, bringing wealth to the company and its investors. The company's 1911 oil discovery in North Eastern Oklahoma opened up oil development in a great region from Eastern Oklahoma west to Mervine, Newkirk, Blackwell, Billings and Garber and led to the founding of the Marland Oil Company, later renamed the Continental Oil Company, or Conoco.

McCaskey quickly moved on to other opportunities, organizing the Southwestern Oil Company with leases in Ranger, Texas and took into this new venture Lewis Haines Wentz, a former sauerkraut salesman in his brokerage company and J. J. McGraw, a Ponca City Banker. In this capacity he promoted the Newkirk, Blackwell, Billings, Graber and the Tonkawa Three Sands Field, one of the best known oil fields of its day, producing income of over one million dollars per month in the 1920s. During this time he also formed and was president of a number of companies in the area including the Kay County Gas Company, The Kiowa, and the Peoples Fuel and Supply Company.

== Ventures in Fort Worth ==
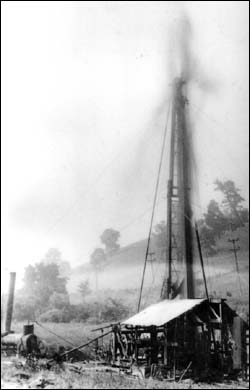
Original 101 Ranch Oil well

In November 1916, in exchange for cash and company stock, McCaskey sold his interests to the Marland Refining Company (later Incorporated in Delaware, January 3, 1921 as the Marland Oil Company, trading on the New York Stock Exchange. The company was renamed the Continental Oil Company on June 26, 1929). He then associated himself with Lewis Haines Wentz under the McCaskey/Wentz Corporation (later the Wentz Corporation). From its start the company prospered and brought wealth to both McCaskey and Wentz. Leaving Wentz in charge of the Ponca City operations McCaskey moved his family to Fort Worth acquiring a home that had been deserted by the German Consulate at the beginning of World War I, 1316 Pennsylvania Avenue; later the clubhouse for The Woman's Club of Fort Worth. He then formed (together with Lew Wentz) and was president of the publicly traded (on the Pittsburgh Stock Exchange) Duquesne Oil Corporation, States Oil Corporation, and West Texas Oil Corporation. By 1920 he and his partners were reported to control about 10 percent of the world's oil production.

== Death and philanthropic activities ==
The remarkable achievements of McCaskey were compressed into the short span of forty-nine years, for he died in Pittsburgh, January 12, 1924, leaving five orphaned children, only a few years after his wife (Mary Florence Ashford) died, July 11, 1921, in an automobile accident while motoring to their summer home on Lake Erie. This ended her extensive philanthropic activities in Fort Worth to include active membership on the board of All Saints Hospital of Fort Worth (since 2001 the Baylor All Saints Hospital of Fort Worth), president of the Woman's Service league of Trinity Episcopal Church of Fort Worth, and her funding a summer camp for Fort Worth's 75 newsboys.

== The John G. McCaskey Trust, 1924 ==
In 1927 the Pennsylvania Orphans Court removed Wentz as trustee of the J. G. McCaskey Trust that benefited McCaskey's five orphaned children. The court had discovered that since the trust could not fund the oil properties’ development, Wentz had purchased the oil and gas properties from the estate without a competitive bid (an egregious violation of his fiduciary duties) and had paid for the properties with his personal unsecured note. In 1927, the Executor Harrison Nesbit (President of the Pittsburgh Bank, board member of the Cleveland Fed, and Westinghouse Electric and Weirton Steel) requested that the Pennsylvania Orphans Court approve Wentz’s paying an additional $1.8 million for McCaskey’s 1/3 ownership for these properties, which was easy for him to do, since by 1927 the properties were producing $1.0 million per month.

== Images ==
Marland and McCaskey photo, Pittsburgh 1906

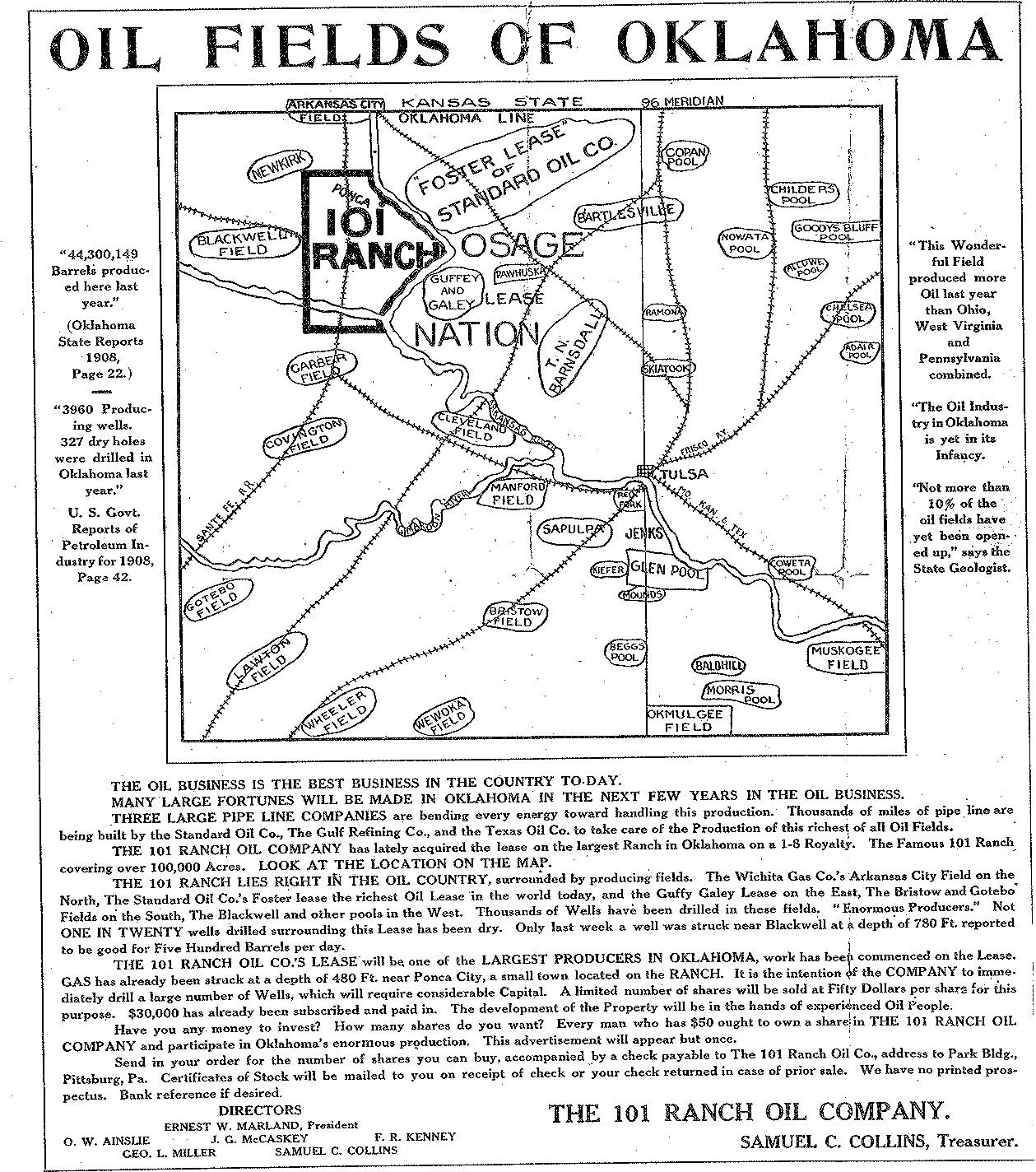
101 Ranch Oil Company Stock Offering

Tonkowa Field Developers

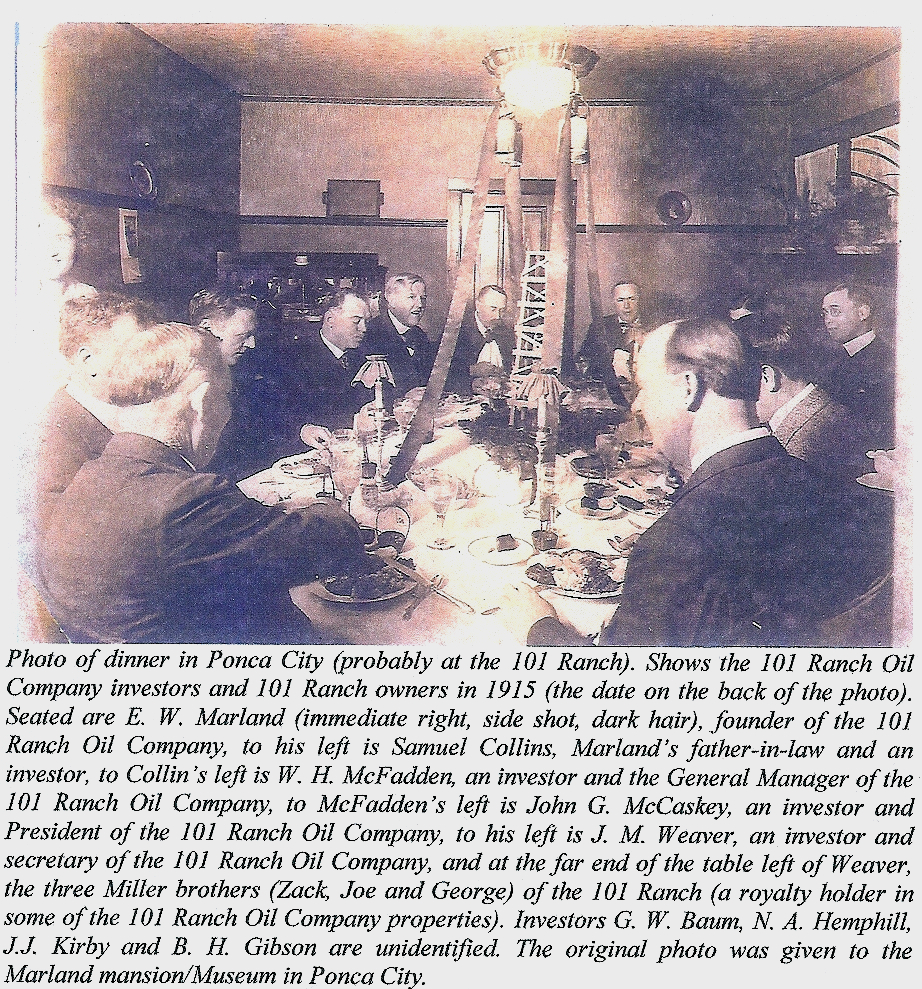
101 Ranch Oil Company celebration dinner @1915

1916 News clip from Blackwell Daily @head of 101 Ranch Oil Company

1921 Pittsburgh Dispatch appreciation of McCaskey's philanthropy
