= Hub Andrews =

American baseball player (1922-2012)

- Pitcher
- Born: August 31, 1922; Burbank, Oklahoma, U.S.
- Died: March 11, 2012 (aged 89); Dodge City, Kansas, U.S.
- Batted: Right Threw: Right

MLB debut
- April 20, 1947, for the New York Giants

Last MLB appearance
- April 30, 1948, for the New York Giants

MLB statistics
- Win–loss record: 0–0
- Earned run average: 4.63
- Strikeouts: 2
- Stats at Baseball Reference

Teams
- New York Giants (1947–1948)

Herbert Carl "Hub" "Tuny" Andrews (August 31, 1922 – March 11, 2012), sometimes known as Hubert Andrews, was an American professional baseball player whose career spanned five seasons, including parts of two in Major League Baseball with the New York Giants in 1947 and 1948. Over his career in the majors, Andrews did not compile a record with a 4.63 earned run average (ERA) and two strikeouts. Andrews began his professional career in 1942 with the minor league Fort Smith Giants of the Class-C Western Association. His career was soon interrupted when he served in the United States armed forces during World War II. After the war, Andrews returned to professional baseball. The other minor league teams Andrews played for were the Triple-A Jersey City Giants and the Triple-A Minneapolis Millers. In the minors, Andrews had a career record of 38–38 in 113 games pitched. Andrews batted and threw right-handed.

== Early life and education ==
Andrews graduated from Ponca City High School in Ponca City, Oklahoma and attended Independence Community College, Independence, Kansas in 1941 and 1946. He joined the United States Army Air Forces on November 7, 1942, and served until 1945. He married Margery L. Cheney on December 23, 1942, in Sherman, Texas. They lived in Independence until moving to Dodge City, Kansas in 1964.

== Professional career ==
Andrews began his professional baseball career in 1942 with the Class-C Fort Smith Giants of the Western Association. That season, Andrews went 10–5 in 26 games pitched. After his first season, Andrews left professional baseball to fight in World War II for the United States armed forces. He returned from war and continued his baseball career in 1946 with the Triple-A Jersey City Giants of the International League. That season, Andrews went 7–11 with a 4.15 earned run average (ERA), six complete games, two shutouts and 43 strikeouts in 30 games, 17 starts. On April 20, 1947, Andrews made his debut in Major League Baseball after being called up from the minor leagues by the New York Giants. In that game, which was against the Philadelphia Phillies, Andrews pitched 2 2/3, giving-up two runs, both earned. During that season in the majors, Andrews pitched seven games with the Giants, compiling no record with a 6.23 ERA and two strikeouts. That season, Andrews also pitched in the minors with Jersey City, going 13–6 with a 3.28 ERA, 10 complete games, two shutouts and 44 strikeouts in 21 games, 19 starts.

In January 1948, Andrews re-signed with New York. He played one game at the major league level with New York, giving-up no runs in three innings pitched on April 30, against the Boston Braves. That game would prove to be his last in the major leagues. For the duration of the season, Andrews pitched in the minor leagues with two Triple-A teams, the Jersey City Giants of the International League and the Minneapolis Millers of the American Association. With Jersey City, Andrews went 5–6 with a 4.50 ERA and 33 strikeouts in 14 games, 13 starts. In the American Association, Andrews went 1–5 with an 8.45 ERA in 10 games. Andrews spent his final season in professional baseball in 1949 with the Jersey City Giants. That season, he went 2–5 with a 6.95 ERA and 24 strikeouts in 12 games, three starts.

== Death ==
Andrews died on March 11, 2012.
