= Kareem Salama =

American musician

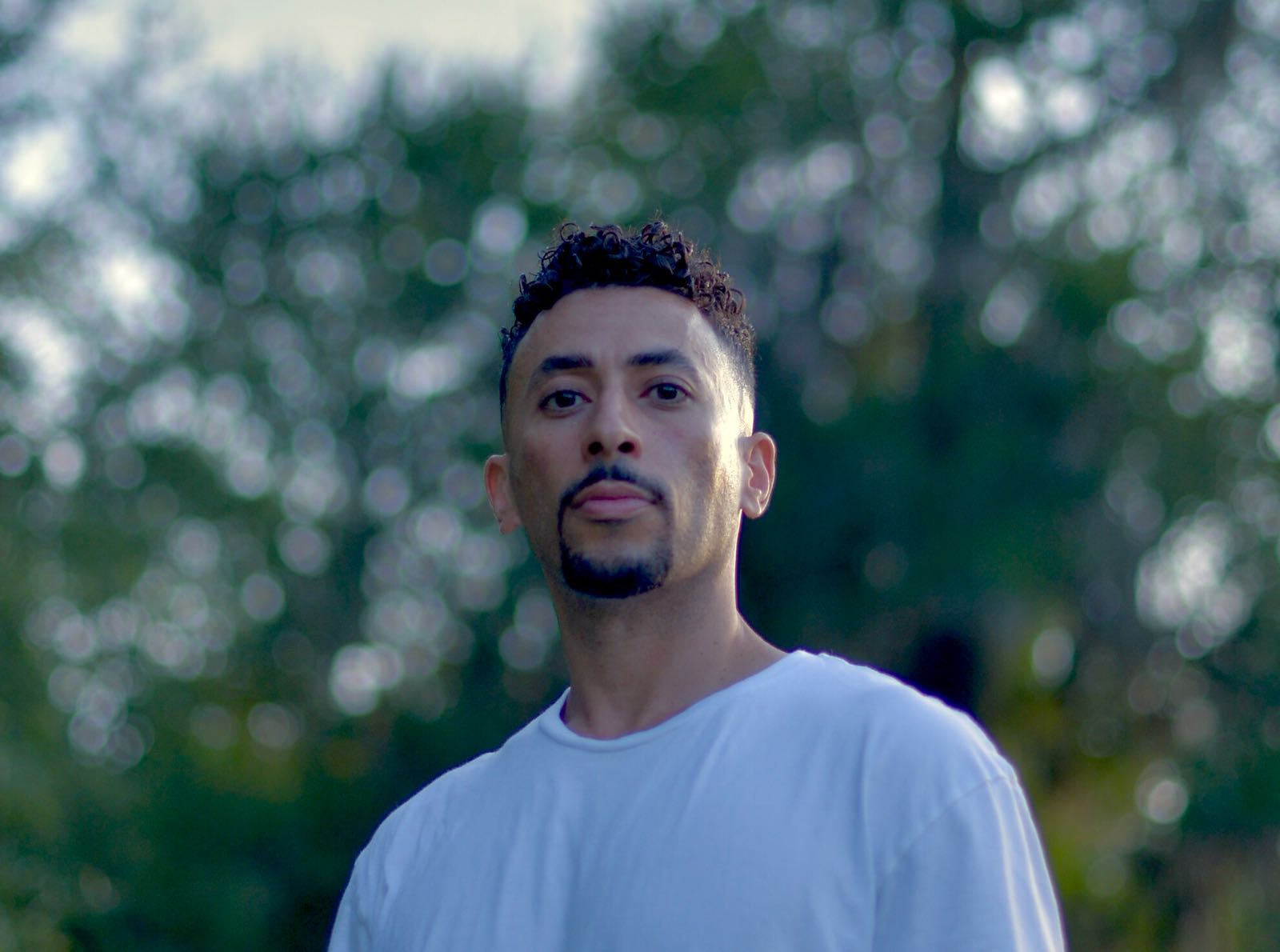

Background information
- Born: Kareem Salama; Ponca City, Oklahoma, United States
- Origin: Ponca City, Oklahoma, United States
- Genres: Country; pop
- Occupation: Musician
- Instruments: Vocals; guitar
- Years active: 2006–present
- Label: LightRain Records
- Website: kareemsalama.com

Kareem Salama is an American musician of Egyptian descent. He is a singer-songwriter and penned by some in the media as the first American Muslim country music singer. His music is a hybrid of country, pop and rock music. He has released three albums Generous Peace (2006), This Life of Mine (2007) and a third City of Lights (2011), the latter after signing for LightRain Records.

== Background and education ==
Salama was born in Ponca City, Oklahoma, United States. His parents immigrated to the United States from Egypt in the late 1960s to attend graduate school. He studied at University of Oklahoma, where he majored in chemical engineering. Then he entered law school at the University of Iowa in Iowa City graduating with a degree in Law.

== Career ==
With his parents' encouragement and financial assistance, Salama began recording his first album Generous Peace while in law school with Greek-American producer, Aristotle Mihalopoulos. Salama also released the title track "Generous Peace" as his debut single accompanied by a music video. After another self-released album titled This Life of Mine, Salama was signed in 2011 to LightRain Records that released his third album to which he is signed.

Salama has performed in front of audiences as far as Rome and London. He also took part in a State Department European concert tour, performing in Paris. He has been featured in major media outlets like the New York Times, Christian Science Monitor, Reader's Digest, Fox News, Sky News and France 24..

Salama also embarked on a Middle East and North Africa tour in summer 2010. visiting Egypt, Morocco, Syria, Jordan, Kuwait and Bahrain.

== Influences ==
While in school, Salama made time to work on his music with a friend and producer Aristotle Mihalopoulos. Salama says that his music is inspired by a variety of things including his own experiences, experiences of friends and family, and things that he reads. As a result of growing in Oklahoma Salama was around country music from the time he was very young and is attracted to the stories and the reverent nature of country music.

Salama highlights universal themes about love, home and family values. His songs are spiritual, without being overtly religious. One inspired by the writings of an 8th-century Islamic scholar, Imam Muhammed Al-Shafi'ee, endorses the idea of tolerance and avoiding violence in his debut single "Generous Peace": "Gentleman, I'm like incense, the more you burn me, the more I'm fragrant."

== The WitWits ==
The WitWits is a television youth project and is a LightRain Records presentation in association with Zenfilm. It is co-written by Kareem and Omar Salama, directed by W. Ross Wells and produced by Meridith Melville and Brittany Holland. The WitWits is about four kids, Kelly Ann (Alicia Lore), Super K (Caleb Duncan), Spencer (Austin Karkowsky), and Dougie (Grant Goodman) and their adventures in the 1980s, particularly in facing their nemesis, Rodney (Connor Jones). The project includes various television episodes, theatrical music videos as well as musical releases including promotional materials, singles with their debut "Radio Countdown" and a prospective album.

== Discography ==
=== Albums ===
Salama has released three albums thus far:

Title and details	Notes
Generous Peace: Released: 2006; Label: Self-published	No. / Title / Length; 1. / "Get Busy Living"; 2. / "Baby I'm a Soldier"; 3. / "A Land Called Paradise"; 4. / "Valley"; 5. / "Hold On"; 6. / "Peace Remain"; 7. / "Come Now"; 8. / "Lady Mary"; 9. / "Chivalry's Not Dead"
This Life of Mine: Released: 2007; Label: Self-published	No. / Title / Length; 1. / "This Life of Mine"; 2. / "Generous Peace"; 3. / "More Than"; 4. / "I Miss You (Hopefully)"; 5. / "Rise Up Protectors"; 6. / "My Tears Aren't Pure"; 7. / "It Came to Be"; 8. / "A Friend Like You"; 9. / "Get Busy Living" (Acoustic)"; 10. / "My Way Home"; 11. / "Aristotle and Averroes"
City of Lights: Released: 24 May 2011; Label: LightRain Records	No. / Title / Length; 1. / "Makes Me Crazy" / 3:31; 2. / "Heavenly Dreams (feat. Kelley Peters)" / 4:13; 3. / "1980 Something (feat. The WitWits)" / 4:12; 4. / "City of Lights" / 4:57; 5. / "We Could Be Friends" / 3:54; 6. / "Believe in Love" / 4:58; 7. / "If I Could" / 3:28; 8. / "Generous Peace" / 3:31; 9. / "Beat in My Heart (feat. Electric Love Café)" / 4:29; 10. / "Love Relentlessly" / 3:41; 11. / "When I Fall" / 4:03; 12. / "Picnics and Sunshine" / 3:39; 13. / "Aristotle and Averroes" / 3:29; 14. / "Baby I'm a Soldier" / 4:51; 15. / "Baby I'm a Soldier (Part II)" / 1:21

=== EPs ===
Title and details
Generous Peace EP
- Released: 7 December 2009
- Label: Catapult
Notes

No.	Title	Length
1.	"Generous Peace"	3:34
2.	"Generous Peace (Pop Remix)"	3:34
3.	"Generous Peace (Acoustic Remix)"	3:34
4.	"When I Fall (Bonus track)"	4:02
5.	"Generous Peace Arabic"	3:34
6.	"Generous Peace Arabic (Pop Remix)"	3:34
7.	"Generous Peace Arabic (Acoustic Remix)"	3:34

=== Singles ===
Date	Song title	Album	Record label	Length
7 December 2009	"Generous Peace"	Generous Peace	Independent	
17 January 2011	"Makes Me Crazy"	City of Light	LightRain Records	3:29
20 March 2011	"Be Free Now" (feat. Kelley Peters)	City of Light	LightRain Records	4:02
1 May 2012	"I Am You"		LightRain Records	4:50
19 March 2019	"Looking at You"		LightRain Records	3:40
8 May 2019	"Just Wanna Come Home"		LightRain Records	3:21

== Videography ==
- "Generous Peace" (music video directed by Lena Khan)
  - "Generous Peace" (Arabic)
- "Makes Me Crazy"
- "Be Free Now" (feat. Kelley Peters)
- "1980 Something" (feat. The WitWits)
- "Just Wanna Come Home"

== Kareem Salama in popular culture ==
- On May 9, 2007, Kareem Salama was interviewed on Fox News about various Muslim American issues.
- A reportage and brief interview about him was broadcast on France 24.
- In March 2008, he was interviewed on Arab Radio and Television Network (ART) program "From America" by Jihan Mansour. He also performed live renditions of some of his songs with Aristotle Mihalopoulos
- On 13 July 2008, he was interviewed on Sky News by Adam Boulton.
