= Ponca City High School =

Coordinates: 36.715380°N 97.077456°W

Location
- 927 North Fifth Street; Ponca City, Oklahoma 74601; United States

Information
- Type: Co-educational, public, secondary
- Established: 1927
- School district: Ponca City Public Schools
- Authority: OSDE
- Staff: 79.08 (FTE)
- Grades: 9–12
- Enrollment: 1,456 (2023-2024)
- Student to teacher ratio: 18.41
- Colors: Blue and red
- Athletics conference: 6A District 4
- Sports: Baseball, basketball, cheerleading, cross country, football, golf, soccer, swimming, tennis, track, volleyball, wrestling
- Mascot: Wildcat
- Rivals: Stillwater High School, Tulsa Union High School
- Yearbook: Cat Tale
- Website: Ponca City Wildcats

Ponca City High School is a public high school that serves approximately 1,500 students in grades 9–12, located in Ponca City, Oklahoma, United States. The current main principal is Thad Dilbeck.

The school's boundary includes Ponca City and White Eagle.

The school operates on a semester schedule. Students attend six 55-minute periods daily, and also attend a 40-minute MUST (mandatory uninterrupted study time) period daily. A minimum of 46 credits is required for graduation.

Ponca City High School students are called "Wildcats," a title that represents hard work, perseverance, and extreme loyalty to the school, embodied by the school mascot, "Willie" the Wildcat.

== Notable alumni ==
- Hub Andrews, professional baseball player
- Douglas Blubaugh, Olympic wrestling gold medal winner, 1960
- June Cobb, CIA informant
- Richard E. Killblane, military historian and author
- Candy Loving, 25th anniversary Playboy Playmate
- Jake McNiece, World War II paratrooper and leader of the Filthy Thirteen
- Don Nickles, United States senator from Oklahoma
- Anthony Taylor, Roman Catholic bishop
- Lara Teeter, Tony Award nominee
- Mike Thompson, baseball player
- Shelby Wilson, Olympic wrestling gold medal winner, 1960
