= Lewis Haines Wentz =

American oil businessman (1877–1949)

- Lewis Haines Wentz @ 1920
- Born: November 10, 1877; Tama, Iowa
- Died: June 9, 1949 (aged 71); Ponca City, Oklahoma

Lewis Haines Wentz (November 10, 1877 – June 9, 1949) was an American oil businessman.

== Early life ==
Lewis Haines Wentz, (Lew Wentz) born in Tama, Iowa, on November 10, 1877, was an essential factor in opening up the oil fields of Oklahoma. Reared in Pittsburgh, Pennsylvania Wentz was too poor for college and started out in 1909 by organizing a semi-professional baseball team, the old Oneida Base Ball Club, that was organized in an effort to build a better team than Barney Dreyfuss’ Pittsburgh Pirates. Wentz was a playing manager. His second business venture happened when he was coaching high school baseball and campaigning door to door for the GOP when he rang the bell of the very wealthy John G. McCaskey. McCaskey had made a huge fortune in the sauerkraut business and had recently become an investor and President of the 101 Ranch Oil Company located on the Miller Brothers 101 Ranch property in Ponca City, Oklahoma. Wentz soon went to work for McCaskey in his sauerkraut operation.

== Oil business ventures ==
In 1911, Wentz at the age of 34, was sent to Ponca City, to check on McCaskey's investments with the Miller Brothers 101 Ranch and E. W. Marland's 101 Ranch Oil Company. He was present on June 11, 1911 when that company's first oil well "Wilie-Cries-For-War" came in. Shortly thereafter, McCaskey gave Wentz a chance to join the 101 Ranch Oil Company as Company Secretary.

Through his association with the 101 Ranch Oil Company Wentz became interested in the oil business and in a few years, with money provided by McCaskey and another partner, Joseph M. Weaver, Wentz began gathering lease land in Northwest Kay County and soon the McCaskey-Wentz Company was developed.

The Company's leases covered a wide range around Ponca City. Early strikes were at the Mervien Oil Field east of Kildare, and the Three Sands area near Tonkawa. Later he was also involved with McCaskey in forming the publicly traded (on the Pittsburgh Stock Exchange) Duquesne Oil Corporation, States Oil Corporation, and West Texas Oil Corporation.

In 1924, after McCaskey's death, Wentz bought out his partners of the McCaskey Wentz Corporation, formed the Wentz Oil Corporation and began to seriously develop the Three Sands fields. The McKee lease in the sands was one of the best producers in north central Oklahoma.

In 1927 the Pennsylvania Orphans Court removed Wentz as trustee of the J. G. McCaskey Trust that benefited McCaskey's five orphaned children. The court had discovered that since the trust could not fund the oil properties' development, Wentz had purchased the oil and gas properties from the estate without a competitive bid (an egregious violation of his fiduciary duties) and had paid for the properties with his personal unsecured note. However, the family chose to honor the purchase. By the end of 1927 this property was making $1 million a month. He was then one of the seven richest men in the nation, having reported taxable income among the top seven individuals reporting in 1927. This ranked him with Henry Ford, J. D. Rockefeller and J. P. Morgan.

== Philanthropic activities ==
Wentz organized and provided funding for the Oklahoma Crippled Children's Society. He built a public Olympic size swimming pool and provided the land for the public golf course (originally known as Lakeside, now renamed Lew Wentz Memorial Golf Course) for Ponca City. He established a boys and girls camp (Wentz Camp) in Ponca City and a wild game sanctuary near Ponca City. All of these facilities remain in operation to this day.

Wentz established foundations for student loans and Project Awards at four Oklahoma colleges/universities under the nomenclature the Lew Wentz Foundation. When Wentz sold his oil interests just before the 1929 crash he increased his support for higher education at these colleges. Shortly before his death on June 9, 1949, he acquired a number of Texas oil leases. Upon his death he left an estate worth $50 million and each of the colleges received additional millions from the Wentz foundation.

Lew Wentz never married. His residence was primarily a suite at the Arcade Hotel in Ponca City, OK.
