= 101 Ranch Oil Company =

Founded in 1908 by oil exploration pioneer E. W. Marland, The 101 Ranch Oil Company was located on the Miller Brothers 101 Ranch and headquartered in Ponca City, Oklahoma. The company's 1911 oil discovery in North Eastern Oklahoma opened up oil development in a great region from Eastern Oklahoma west to Mervine, Newkirk, Blackwell, Billings and Garber and led to the founding of the Marland Oil Company, later renamed the Continental Oil Company, now known as Conoco.

== Background ==
Ernest Whitworth Marland was born in Pittsburgh, Pennsylvania on May 8, 1874. Marland studied to be an attorney, receiving an LL.B. from the University of Michigan Law School at the age of nineteen in 1893. Marland moved back to Pittsburgh and set up private practice. As an attorney representing local coal and oil interests of Pittsburgher James M. Guffey, the nation's largest oil and gas producer and the principal investor in Beaumont Texas’ Spindletop discovery, Marland became interested in geology and by the age of 33, the young lawyer had become involved in a series of local coal and oil promotions which soon made him a small fortune.

Unfortunately for Marland, the millions he had amassed were lost following the panic of 1907. By 1908, Marland was broke and without a job.

== Founding ==
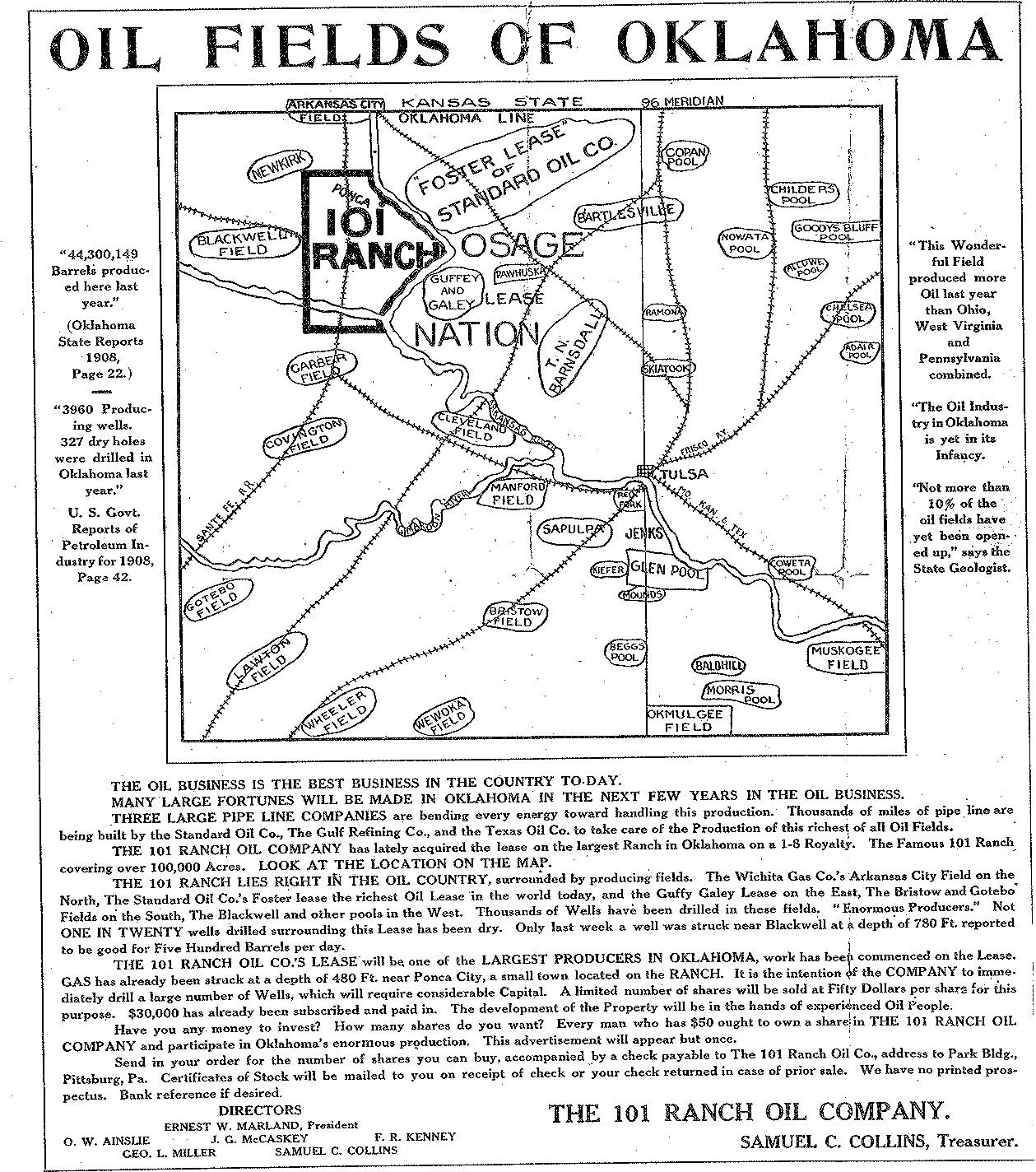

Interested in reestablishing his oil ventures, Marland came to Ponca City upon the urging of a relative, Lt. Franklin Roosevelt Kenney, who introduced Marland to the Miller brothers - Joseph "Joe" Carson Miller, Zachary "Zack" Taylor Miller and George Lee Kockernut Miller, of the famous 101 Ranch near Ponca City.

He decided that the Ranch surface geology indicated that there was oil in the area. Geology was his divining rod, he said, a science yet to be proven in the hunt for crude. Marland returned to Pittsburgh and raised $500,000 (Note: Estimates of initial capital vary from between $500,000 to $1,000,000. The Offering Bill for 101 Ranch Oil Company @1909 is held by the CONOCO museum, Ponca City, Oklahoma.) for a new oil venture, naming it the 101 Ranch Oil Company with himself as president and taking into the company as directors, O. W. Ainslie, the chef at Pittsburgh's Boyer Hotel, J. G. McCaskey, a sauerkraut producer, Marland's relative, F. R. Kenney, a retired chair manufacturer, George Miller of the 101 Ranch, and Marland's father-in-law, Samuel Collins who was also elected Treasurer.

== Drilling for oil ==
Upon his return to the ranch he began drilling. The first well located near the "White House", the ranch headquarters for the Miller brothers' 101 Ranch, was a 2,500 foot dry well. The next seven wells were uneconomic gas wells and by 1910 the company was on the verge of failure.

== Restructure ==
Then John G. McCaskey, the “Sauerkraut King”, a wealthy investor and young Pittsburgh adulthood friend of Marland's reorganized the company. Elected President, McCaskey raised funds from Pittsburgh investors including W. H. McFadden, a retired President of Mackintosh, Hemphill & Co., a rolling mill manufacturer and J. M. Weaver, a business associate of McCaskey's. McFadden was elected vice president and general manager of the company and Weaver was elected Secretary and Treasurer. In 1911 Pittsburghers held the stock of the company. These were E. W. Marland, J. G. McCaskey, W. H. McFadden, G. W. Baum, Vice President of Pittsburgh Rubber and Hemphill's son in law, N. A. Hemphill, co-founder of Mackintosh, Hemphill & Co. a rolling mill manufacturer and business associate of W.H. McFadden, Pittsburgh Alderman J. J. Kirby, J. M. Weaver, Brownlee Harper Gibson, a 1906 Princeton graduate and insurance broker and Hemphill's son in law, C. L. Stevens a Pennsylvania Medical Society member, J. J. Kearns, President of Electric Service Company, and Marland's father-in-law Samuel C. Collins. Later, McCaskey appointed Lewis Haines Wentz, an employee in his sauerkraut operation, Secretary of the company.

== Ponca lease ==
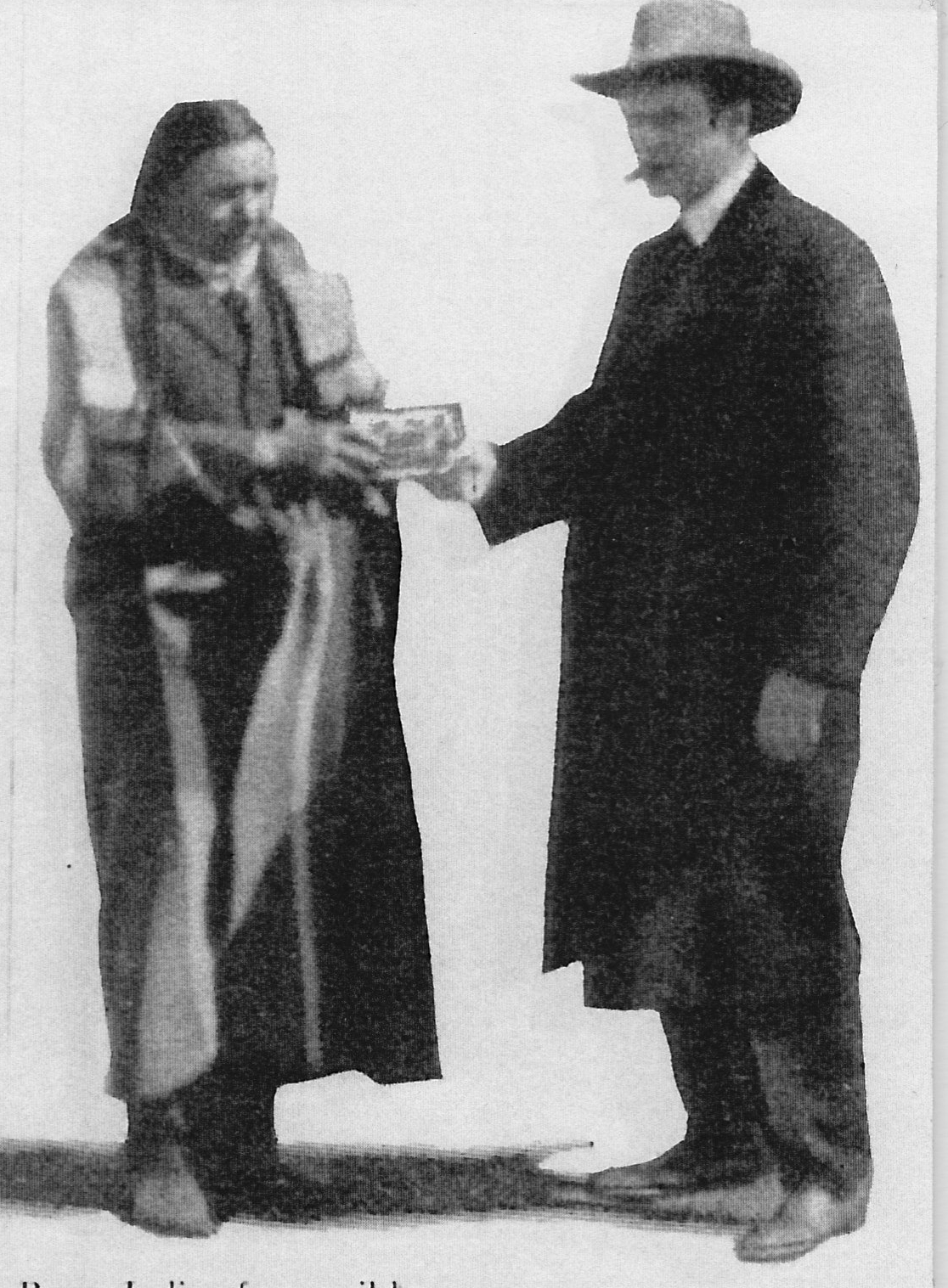
McCaskey paying Ponca Indian for oil lease @1910

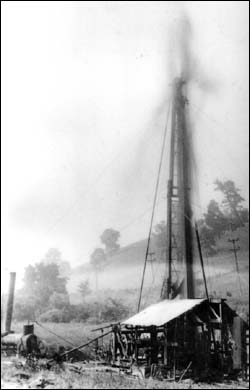
Original 101 Ranch Oil well

With new money, and using his practical knowledge of geology Marland choose a new well site at an elongated and isolated hill near Bodark Creek that he thought was a geological high as well as a topographic high. However, the hill Marland picked was a burial ground for the Ponca tribe. Actually the Ponca bound their dead, laid them upon scaffolds and wild animals devoured them. These scaffolds were on the crest of the hill in the exact location that Marland wanted to drill.

Marland and the Millers met with White Eagle, Chief of the Ponca and emerged with permission to drill off the crest of the hill on an allotment owned by the Ponca Indian, Willie-Cries-for-War. For a $1,000 annual payment and a 12.5% override, a lease was obtained and on June 11, 1911, that well “Willie-Cries-For-War” struck oil, at 120 barrels per day and stayed in production until 1976 (The year that Willie Cries for War died), bringing wealth to the company and its investors. (1).

== Marland Oil Company and CONOCO ==
The main office was in Ponca City and the company stayed in operation until November 1916 when it was sold for cash and stock in the Marland Oil Company, later (January 3, 1921), incorporated in Delaware to acquire through an exchange of stock control of the Marland Refining Co. and Kay County Gas Co. Name changed to Continental Oil Company June 26, 1929, at which time it acquired for a consideration of 2,317,266 shares of stock, the assets of Continental Oil Company, per Moody's Industrial Manual 1960 a Maine corporation, founded in 1875 as the Continental Oil and Transportation Company, based in Ogden, Utah, originally a coal, oil, kerosene, grease and candles distributor in the West.

== Images ==
Marland and McCaskey photo, Pittsburgh 1906

Chief White Eagle of the Ponca Tribe.

1911 Ponca Field Plat

1911 gathering of 101 Ranch oil Company first well

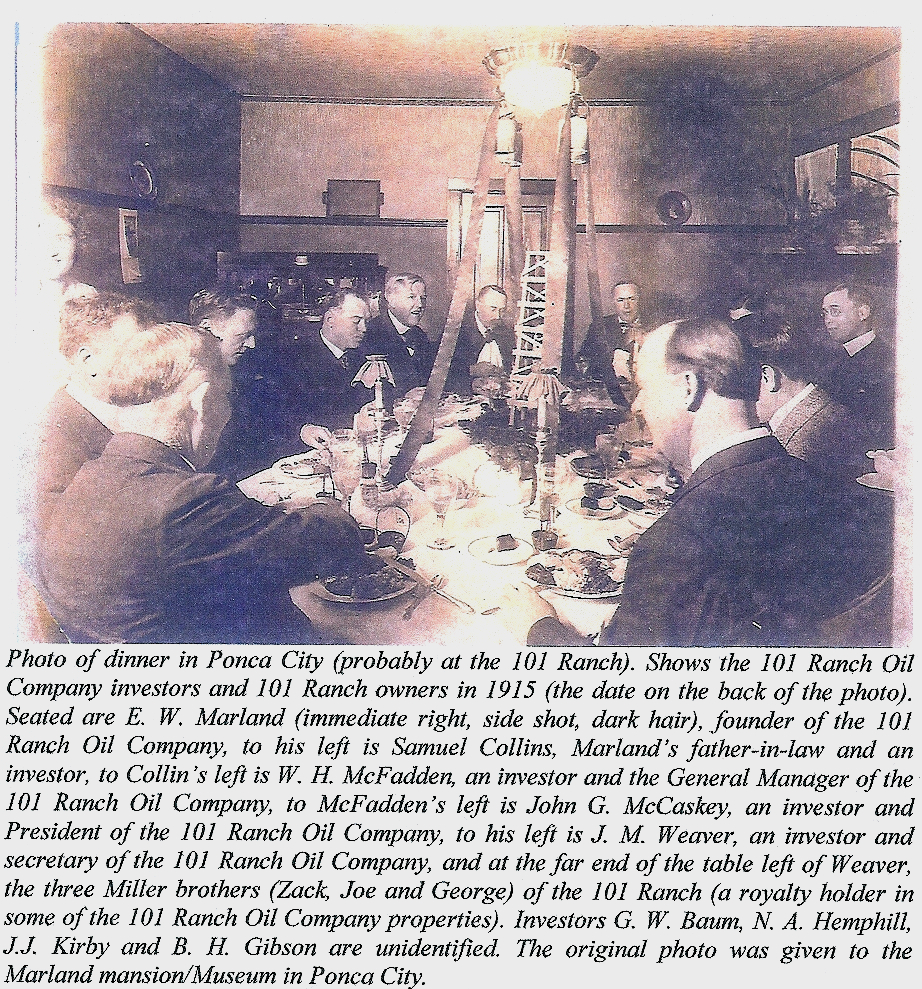
101 Ranch Oil Company celebration dinner @1915

1916 News clip from Blackwell Daily @head of 101 Ranch Oil Company
