= June Cobb =

American informant for the CIA

Viola June Cobb (August 24, 1927 – October 17, 2015) was an American informant for the CIA. She worked at Fidel Castro's headquarters in Havana as a translator and public relations worker in 1959 and 1960. After leaving Cuba, Cobb continued working for the CIA in Guatemala and Mexico. She was the first CIA asset to relay an account of Lee Harvey Oswald having attended a twist party in Mexico City weeks before the assassination of John F. Kennedy. Earlier in the 1950s, Cobb was involved with the production and trafficking of narcotics with her Colombian fiancé and his twin brother. She later provided information to the US Federal Bureau of Narcotics that led to arrests in Cuba and Colombia.

Cobb was fluent in Spanish, notably translating Castro's "History Will Absolve Me" speech and former Guatemalan president Juan José Arévalo's short story The Shark and the Sardines.

== Early life and education ==
Viola June Cobb was born on August 24, 1927, in Ponca City, Oklahoma, to Jasper E. Cobb and Jesse Lois Sharp. She graduated from Ponca City High School, and went on to attend University of Oklahoma for one year in the mid-1940s. She then worked at a Ponca City radio station and for a local newspaper as a courthouse reporter. She was an adjunct of the Civil Air Patrol squadron in Norman, Oklahoma, attaining the rank of 2nd class Lieutenant.

== Travels to Mexico and Colombia ==
After leaving the University of Oklahoma, Cobb traveled to Mexico, where she met Rafael Herran Olozaga, who was from a wealthy and politically connected Colombian family. Both his great-grandfather, Pedro Alcántara Herrán, and his great-great-grandfather, Tomás Cipriano de Mosquera, had served as Presidents of Colombia. His family disapproved of the relationship, considering Cobb beneath his station. They were later engaged.

Cobb took extension classes with Olozaga at the National University in Mexico City in 1947. In Mexico, she worked for an oil firm in public relations. She also edited Modern Mexico, a Mexican Chamber of Commerce publication.

In 1948, Cobb traveled with Olozaga and his twin brother Tomas to Colombia. The brothers had plans to cultivate and traffic opium. By 1949, they were on a six-month expedition in the Ecuadorian jungle where they were engaged in cocaine production. Cobb worked for Pan American Airways and was a public relations employee in Guayaquil, Ecuador. Six months later, Cobb was back in Colombia. She returned to Oklahoma in 1950 and spent around ten months living with her father, working as a news reporter in Kay County.

Cobb returned to Colombia in 1951 and contracted leishmaniasis, a rare tropical disease. She returned to the United States for treatment, spending several months hospitalized at Mount Sinai Hospital in New York City. After she recovered, she spent five months working at the hospital as an administrative assistant for Dr. Isidore Snapper. In early 1952, Cobb began a relationship with the Federal Bureau of Narcotics. During the summer of 1952, she was employed with Time magazine in their letters department. Cobb then moved to Chicago and worked as a secretary again for Snapper, who was now the director of medical education at Cook County Hospital.

Cobb returned to New York City in 1953 and found work as an interpreter and translator. Her friend Warren Broglie, manager of the Waldorf Astoria, referred clients to her. Towards the end of 1953, Cobb worked briefly for Foster Wheeler, a firm that was building a refinery in Colombia. In the summer of 1954, Cobb was treated for agranulocytosis at Beth-El Hospital in New York.

By 1955, Cobb was traveling in Latin America. In 1956, she worked for the Colombian-American Culture Foundation in Medellin and taught briefly at the American school.

In December 1956, the Olozaga brothers were arrested in Havana for possession and distribution of heroin. The pair were apprehended by Cuban law enforcement officials, with the assistance of US Federal Bureau of Narcotics (FBN) agents, a day after Cobb had left Cuba for Coral Gables, Florida. Cobb had traveled with the brothers to Havana to help them sell several grams of heroin and several ounces of cocaine. The brothers were released quickly, owing to their family connections. In a joint operation of the FBN and the Colombian Intelligence Service, the brothers were arrested again in Medellin, Colombia in February 1957 for running a cocaine laboratory on their parents' estate. FBN agent George Gaffney later recalled that the 1957 operation originated in New Orleans when "a woman with CIA connections offered information" to an agent.

In 1957, Cobb briefly worked as a secretary for county attorney Ralph Haynes.

For a time in 1958, Cobb was acquainted with Dimitre Dimitrov, a Bulgarian politician who had been imprisoned in Greece and interrogated by the CIA as part of Project ARTICHOKE.

By 1959, Cobb had moved to New York City. She lived briefly at the Hotel Iroquois.

== Involvement with Cuba ==
=== Meeting Castro ===
Cobb visited Havana in February 1959 and later recounted meeting with Fidel Castro's Minister of Health regarding their campaign against vice and cooperation with doctors from Bolivia, Peru, and Colombia against the use of coca leaves. During her trip, she was given a copy of Castro's 1953 "History Will Absolve Me" speech. When she returned to the United States, she set about translating the speech to English. Cuban journalist Luis Conte Agüero learned of the translation and visited Cobb in New York. He wrote a prologue for the booklet and assisted with printing costs.

After Castro was sworn in as Cuba's Prime Minister, he visited the United States in April 1959. One evening in New York, Cobb accompanied Agüero to the Statler Hotel, where she was introduced to Castro. She had brought a copy of the translated speech. Castro was pleased when he saw the booklet she had made and ordered a print run of 1,000 copies to be made and distributed in New York. Cobb also met Castro's private secretary Celia Sánchez, who invited her to Havana to work under Castro in the Ministry Office.

=== Working for Castro ===
Cobb agreed, traveling to Cuba afterwards. Her duties in Havana included translating Castro's speeches and working as a public relations assistant. She also translated Castro's new land reform laws into English. She worked on the 18th floor, down the hall from Castro's office. She and William Alexander Morgan were the only Americans to gain any sort of influence in the new regime.

Cobb returned to the United States in June 1959, and again for medical treatment in September and December of that year. While recuperating from surgery, Cobb stayed at a beach house owned by Castro and Sánchez.

Cobb disagreed with Castro openly over his turn to authoritarianism and Marxism, her anger becoming evident as the Communist influence on him became obvious. Cobb had hoped that a cessation in the US bombing of Cuban cane fields would prevent Castro's turn towards dictatorship.

In early 1960, during Castro's second trip to New York, tabloids reported that 17-year-old Marita Lorenz had been raped by the Cuban leader. She was pregnant, and Cobb later said that the father was Castro's bodyguard, Jesus Yanez Pelletier. Lorenz's mother later reported that Cobb had called her and offered her employment if she would return to Cuba with her daughter. Che Guevara conducted an investigation of the incident and Cobb was included in a roundup of the suspects. She was protected by Castro and Sánchez, but the relationship cooled and she lost the access she had had before.

=== CIA recruitment ===
CIA agent Harry Hermsdorf, undercover as a European journalist in Cuba, first met Cobb in the Havana Hilton's hotel coffee shop while having coffee with Jorge Losada, the editor of Vision, a Latin American magazine. Losada introduced Cobb to Hermsdorf, who was using the alias Heinrich Heubner. Following a brief conversation, Cobb agreed to arrange meetings with Cuban officials for Hermsdorf and Der Spiegel correspondent Claus Jacobi.

From May 24–26, 1960, Cobb met with Hermsdorf, who evaluated her at her hotel. Without mentioning the CIA, he offered her a long-term employment opportunity and invited her to meet him somewhere outside of Cuba. They arranged to meet at the Drake Hotel in New York on June 3. Cobb traveled to the United States in early June 1960. She also stopped in Washington, D.C., where she stayed at the Raleigh Hotel. The CIA arranged surveillance of her hotel room and of a polygraph that she took.

Cobb made a verbal agreement to work for the CIA and returned to Havana on June 7, and was to be paid 200 Cuban pesos per month plus expenses. Jean T. Pierson was designated her CIA handler. Hermsdorf asked Cobb to monitor the activities of the chief of Prensa Latina and the head of the Free China News Agency. He also requested that she determine what Antonio Núñez Jiménez had accomplished on his recent trip to the Soviet Union and pass on the "names and contacts of Soviet and satellite citizens" who dealt with the Cuban government. In a June CIA memo from Hermsdorf, he wrote "If Miss Cobb can be controlled and accepts steering, it would perhaps be desirable to mould her into a long-range asset by having her become very cozy with the communist leaders and become, overtly, ever more 'rabid' about the revolutionary movement. Later she could perhaps be used elsewhere in Latin America, probably among the rabid left wing youth groups that are becoming increasingly anti-American and more powerful in various areas."

Cobb left Cuba in September 1960, and on September 12 formalized her contract with the CIA, which stipulated that she received $200 each month for a year-long operation, called JMARC, "to penetrate the Cuban government in an effort to obtain information on present and planned activities of the Castro regime." Cobb was given the cryptonym AMUPAS-1. From September 21 to 29, the CIA maintained surveillance of Cobb's hotel room in New York City. Cobb was acquainted with Kennedy advisor Richard N. Goodwin, and soon had direct access to the White House through him.

While in Havana, on more than one occasion, Cobb met with CIA operative David Sánchez Morales at the house of Geraldine Shamma.

Cobb's first CIA operation involved befriending CBS newscaster Richard Gibson, a co-founder of the Fair Play for Cuba Committee. Cobb determined that Gibson had made a trip to Cuba, met with Castro and Osvaldo Dorticós Torrado, and received money for operating expenses and to maintain the FPCC New York office. In later testimony, Cobb said that she had firsthand knowledge that Cuba was funding the committee. During 1961, Gibson wrote a number of letters to Cobb.

== Guatemala ==
Around 1961, alongside Raul Osegueda, Cobb translated former Guatemalan President Juan José Arévalo's 1956 allegory The Shark and the Sardines to English. From Mexico, Cobb assisted Guatemalan revolutionaries fighting Miguel Ydígoras Fuentes, helping them obtain equipment. She was deported by the Guatemalan police on November 9, 1961. CIA Mexico City cables related that Cobb was deported with Achilles Centeno Perez. Guatemalan border officials told them they would be killed if they returned to the country. Cobb's entry to Mexico was assisted by George Frederick Munro, whose family maintained a ranch in Cuernavaca that Cobb said she visited several times. Munro advised Cobb against returning to Guatemala, where she wanted to complete an undisclosed task on behalf of the CIA.

== Appearance before Senate Subcommittee on Internal Security ==
In March 1962, Cobb was called to testify before an executive session of the Senate Subcommittee on Internal Security. Prior to her appearance, She did not reveal her association with the CIA and members of the subcommittee appeared unaware of the fact.

An August 12, 1962, article by Jack Anderson in Parade magazine painted Cobb as a "soldier of fortune", detailing her time working for Castro and her involvement with drug trafficking in Latin America.

== Mexico City ==
In June 1963, the CIA reapproved Cobb as an informant for WH/3-Mexico D.F., despite an October 1962 CIA security memo recommending no contact with her other than assessment. Later that year, Cobb was transferred to Mexico City and her cryptonym was changed to LICOOKY-1.

Cobb then moved to Mexico City. She was a CIA asset for the Mexico City station, reporting to David Atlee Phillips. Warren Broglie, who was then managing Hotel Luma, passed information to Cobb that she relayed to station chief Winston M. Scott. When she was in need of a residence, her friend Eunice Odio suggested she call Elena Garro.

Following the assassination of John F. Kennedy by Lee Harvey Oswald, and the release of the Warren Report, Cobb was privy to a conversation between Elena Garro, her sister Deva Guerrero, and her daughter. They expressed surprise at seeing Oswald's face in the newspapers, as they said they recognized him from a twist party at the home of Rubén Durán. They said that he was accompanied by two other men who looked like beatniks. In an October 5 report, Cobb informed the CIA of the conversation. Cobb wanted the women to tell American authorities what they knew, but advised them against going to the American embassy, instead suggesting that they go to Texas. Cobb was asked to leave Garro's home after their cat's back legs were found broken.

Oswald had checked out a copy of The Shark and the Sardines from the Dallas Public Library on about November 6, 1963. The book had not been returned.

As of December 1965, Cobb was roommates with Eunice Odio. In 1965 and 1966, Cobb set up Milton Abramson, a New York-based drug trafficker, Adela Castillo, and others for arrest by the FBI in the United States.

== Connection with Jerrie Cobb ==
From 2009 to 2011 independent filmmaker Mary Haverstick was researching a documentary she wanted to make about Jerrie Cobb, an American pilot and aviator who was also part of the Mercury 13. The documentary was never made, but Haverstick continued to visit with Jerrie about her life to write a biography. The two became close. Haverstick concluded that Jerrie Cobb was the well-known American spy June Cobb after several years of research and interaction between the author and Cobb.

== Death ==
After falling ill, June Cobb lived with family in Houston, Texas, for a time until she sustained a head injury in a household accident and was eventually transferred to the Manhattan senior center prior to her death on October 17, 2015. Cobb was survived by her brother Arthur Tom Cobb and his wife, Elizabeth Ann Cobb (Middleton). Cobb was also survived by her nephews Michael Matthew Cobb, Steven Earl Cobb, and Dennis Middleton.

== CIA files ==
The CIA's extensive file on Cobb is estimated to include over 2,500 pages. Following the Kennedy assassination, all of the documents related to Cobb's work with the Federal Bureau of Narcotics were marked secret. Following the passage of the President John F. Kennedy Assassination Records Collection Act of 1992, many of the documents have been declassified. Some of the Warren Commission's declassified files indicate that the CIA, in the late 1970s, refused to help House Select Committee on Assassinations investigators locate Cobb for an interview about Oswald's activities in Mexico.

Further documents concerning Cobb that are related to the assassination were scheduled to be released under the JFK Records Act in October 2017. The National Archives and Records Administration announced that it was preparing a 221-page file of documents related to Cobb.
