= W. H. McFadden =

William H. McFadden
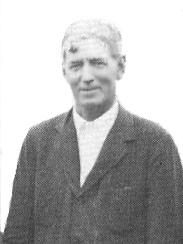
- Born: June 11, 1869; Moundsville, West Virginia
- Died: November 1, 1956 (aged 87); Fort Worth, Texas
- Occupations: Steel Executive and American Oil Businessman

William Hartman McFadden (June 11, 1869 – November 1, 1956) was an American businessman and an essential factor in opening up the oil fields of Oklahoma.

== Early life ==
He was born in Moundsville, West Virginia. At age 19 he apprenticed in the Mackintosh Hemphill Steel Foundry in Pittsburgh, Pennsylvania, and in 1909, at the age of 40, he became president of Mackintosh Hemphill, but resigned shortly thereafter due to ill health, suffering from lungs irritated by a galvanizing compound used in steel mills. He moved to Hot Springs, Arkansas, thinking that he was going to die.

== Oil business ventures ==
In 1910 he was approached by John G. McCaskey, a social acquaintance from Pittsburgh, and E. W. Marland, president and founder of the 101 Ranch Oil Company of Ponca City, Oklahoma, that was on the verge of failure, having run out of money after drilling seven wells and only having found natural gas.(1) McFadden was impressed with Marland and, after visiting the Miller Brothers 101 Ranch property, decided to invest in the company. McCaskey then raised additional funds from Pittsburgh investors, reorganized the company and was elected president; McFadden was elected vice president, general manager. Shortly thereafter a drilling lease was obtained on the Willie Cry Ponca Indian allotment, and on June 11, 1911, the well “Willy-Cries-For-War” struck oil at 120 barrels a day, bringing wealth to the company and its investors. (2, 3)

Later, after McCaskey sold his interests in the 101 Ranch Oil Company and the Kay County Gas Company to Marland Refining Company (later the Marland Oil Company), McFadden was appointed president of the Kay County Gas Company, and also vice president of Marland Refining Company and an executive at Marland Oil Company.

== Political activity ==
In 1914 McFadden was elected mayor of Ponca City, serving until 1920.

== Philanthropic activities and honors ==
McFadden funded and sponsored a private camp, Camp McFadden, for Camp Fire Girls, with over 5,000 girls attending the camp through 1950. He also financed the American Legion Orphans Home School in Ponca City.

In 1935 McFadden was placed in Oklahoma's Hall of Fame. E. W. Marland had a statue of McFadden cast in his likeness called "The Plainsman" which is now on exhibition at Woolaroc Museum in Northeastern Oklahoma on Oklahoma State Highway 123 about 19 km (12 mi) southwest of Bartlesville, Oklahoma and 72 km (45 mi) north of Tulsa, Oklahoma. In 1946 McFadden was awarded the Gulich Award given by the Camp Fire Girls.

McFadden married to Helen Charolette Williams Levi in 1920. They had no children. In 1928 McFadden moved to Fort Worth, Texas, where he died on November 1, 1956, at the age of 87.

== Sources ==
- 1 American Biography a New Cyclopedia, Volume LXV. Published under the direction of The American Historical Society, Inc. New York. 1931. pg. 126 and 127.
- 2 Pittsburgh Dispatch, 1913. Page 1.
- 3 E. W. Marland: Life and Death of an Oil Man, John Joseph Mathews, (Norman: University of Oklahoma Press, 1951) ISBN 0-8061-1238-7.
