= Ponca City, Oklahoma =

Ponca City, Oklahoma Chína Uhánⁿdhe
- City
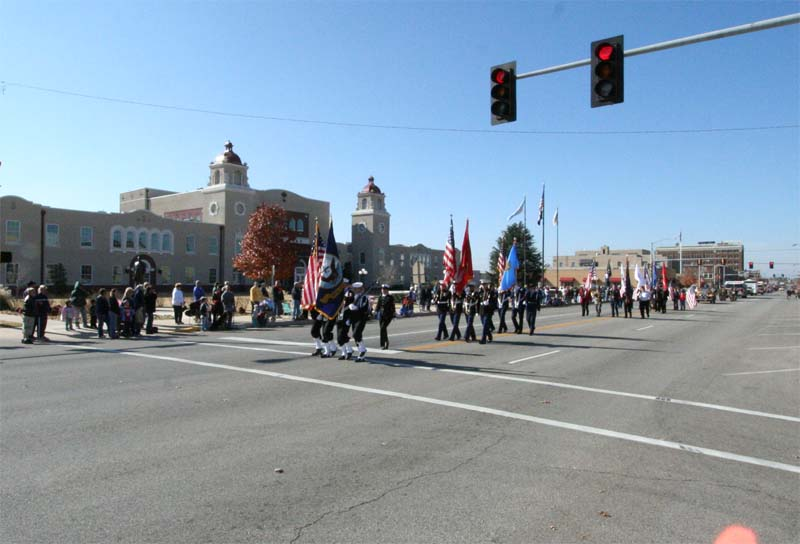
- Veterans Day Parade down Grand Avenue in front of the Ponca City Civic Center and Town Hall

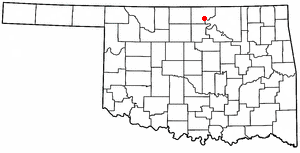
- Location of Ponca City, Oklahoma
- Coordinates: 36°43′25″N 97°04′20″W
- Country: United States
- State: Oklahoma
- County: Kay
- Founded: 1893
- Incorporated: 1899

Government
  - Type: Council - Manager
  - Mayor: Kelsey Wagner
  - Vice-Mayor: Rob Bodick

Area
  - Total: 19.61 sq mi (50.78 km^{2})
  - Land: 18.38 sq mi (47.60 km^{2})
  - Water: 1.23 sq mi (3.19 km^{2})
- Elevation: 1,017 ft (310 m)

Population (2020)
  - Total: 24,424
  - Density: 1,329.1/sq mi (513.15/km^{2})
- Time zone: UTC−6 (Central (CST))
  - Summer (DST): UTC−5 (CDT)
- ZIP codes: 74601-74604
- Area code: 580
- FIPS code: 40-59850
- GNIS feature ID: 2411455
- Website: poncacityok.gov

Ponca City (Iowa-Oto: Chína Uhánⁿdhe) is a city in Kay County in the U.S. state of Oklahoma. The city was named after the Ponca tribe. Ponca City had a population of 24,424 in the 2020 census, down from 25,387 at the time of the 2010 census.

== History ==
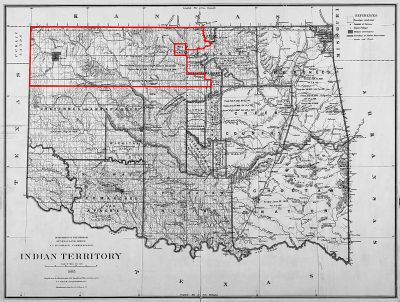
Ponca City was founded after the United States opened the Cherokee Outlet for European-American settlement in the Cherokee Strip land run, the largest land run in United States history.

Ponca City was created in 1893 as "New Ponca" after the United States opened the Cherokee Outlet for European-American settlement during the Cherokee Strip land run, the largest land run in United States history. The site for Ponca City was selected for its proximity to the Arkansas River, a railway, and the presence of a freshwater spring near the river at what is modern 13th Street and South Avenue in Ponca City. The city was laid out by Burton Barnes, who drew up the first survey of the city and sold certificates for the lots he had surveyed. After the drawing for lots in the city was completed, Barnes was elected the city's first mayor.

Another city, Cross, vied with Ponca City to become the leading city in the area. After the Atchison, Topeka and Santa Fe Railway had opened a station in Cross, people thought it would not open another in Ponca City because of the two cities' proximity. New Ponca boosters eventually secured a station after offering the Santa Fe station agent two town lots and the free relocation of his house from Cross. Ponca City reportedly obtained its first boxcar station by some Ponca City supporters going to Cross and returning with the town's station pulled behind them. Cross eventually became defunct, and today, what was once Cross is now a residential district in Ponca City. In 1913, New Ponca changed its name to Ponca City.

During World War II, the city hosted a War Bond Drive to purchase a B-17 Flying Fortress. She was named "Miss Ponca City" with number 42-98170. It was shot down on September 12th, 1944, near Eberswalde, Germany with 3 crew members surviving.

=== Petroleum industry ===
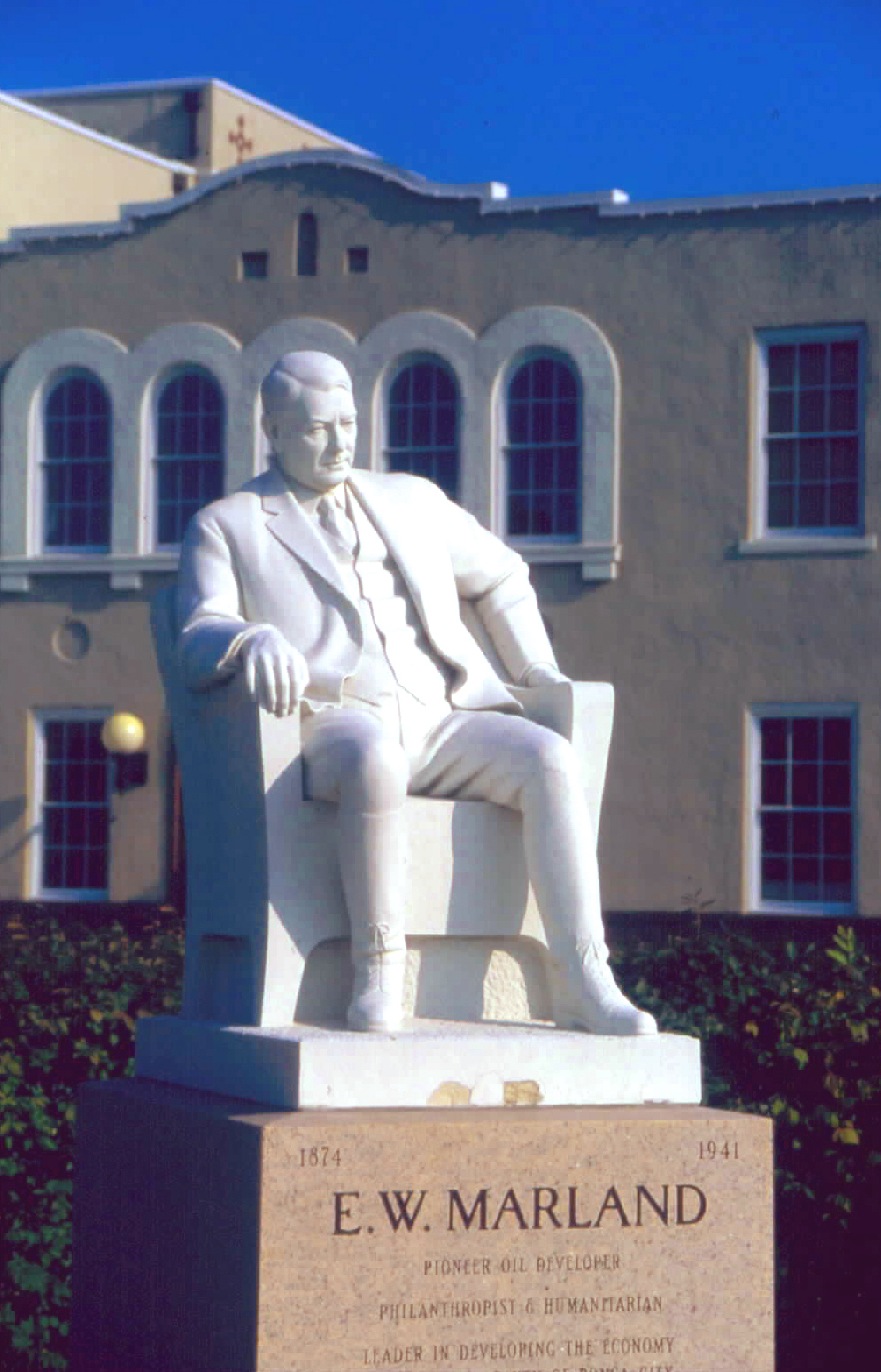
The statue of oilman E. W. Marland, founder of Marland Oil (later Conoco), who later was elected as a U.S. congressman and Oklahoma governor

Ponca City's history and economy has been shaped chiefly by the ebb and flow of the petroleum industry. E. W. Marland, a Pennsylvania oil man, came to Oklahoma and founded the Marland Oil Company, which once controlled about 10% of the world's oil reserves. He founded the 101 Ranch Oil Company, located on the Miller Brothers 101 Ranch, and drilled his first successful oil well on land he leased in 1911 from the Ponca tribe of American Indians. He was elected in 1932 as a U.S. congressman and in 1934 as governor of Oklahoma.

Marland's exploitation of oil reserves generated growth and wealth that were previously unimaginable on the Oklahoma prairie, and his company virtually built the city from the ground up. Marland and his associates built mansions to display their new wealth, including the Grand Home and the E.W. Marland Estate (once called the "Palace on the Prairie"). Because of this period of wealth and affluence, Ponca City has a high concentration of buildings that exemplify the popular Spanish Colonial Revival architecture of the period, as well as Art Deco-influenced buildings and homes.

The "Roaring '20s" came to an end for Ponca City shortly before the Great Depression. After a successful takeover bid by J.P. Morgan, Jr., son of financier J.P. Morgan, Marland Oil Co. merged with Continental Oil Co. in the late 1920s. It was known as Conoco for more than 70 years. The company maintained its headquarters in Ponca City until 1949 and continued to grow into a global corporation.

During the oil boom years of the 1980s, Conoco was owned by the DuPont Corp., which took control of the company in 1981. After nearly two decades of ownership and an oil bust that crippled Oklahoma's economy in the late 1980s, DuPont sold off its Conoco assets in 1998. In 2002, Conoco merged with Phillips Petroleum (another major petroleum player with roots in northern Oklahoma) to become ConocoPhillips. ConocoPhillips was then the sixth-largest publicly traded oil company in the world, and the third largest in the United States. It maintains a significant presence in its historic home state.

Since the company has reduced its workforce and facilities in the city, the population has declined steadily since the early 1990s. In February 2009, ConocoPhillips announced that all of its remaining nonrefinery operations in Ponca City (representing 750 jobs) would be moved out of the city. The city's recent efforts to grow its economy beyond the petroleum industry have attracted a number of technology, manufacturing, and service jobs.

In 2005, ConocoPhillips announced plans to build a $5 million museum across from its Ponca City refinery. Opened to the public in May 2007, the Conoco Museum features artifacts, photographs, and other historical items related to the petroleum industry and its culture in northern Oklahoma. A sister museum, Phillips Petroleum Company Museum, was to be opened in Bartlesville, Oklahoma. Funded by a private foundation, the Conoco Museum charges no admission fee.

In 2012, ConocoPhillips split into two separate companies, with the upstream portion retaining the ConocoPhillips name and the refining and transportation portions taking the name Phillips 66.

Based in Houston, Texas, Phillips 66 continues to operate a 200,000-barrel-per-day refinery. Phillips 66 | Ponca City Refinery in Ponca City.

=== Native Americans ===
The statue of Standing Bear honors the Ponca chief who successfully argued in U.S. District Court in a landmark civil rights case in 1879 that Native Americans are "persons within the meaning of the law" and have the rights of citizenship.

Native American young people are holding flags of their tribes at the dedication of the Standing Bear Museum.

Until recently, European Americans' accounts of their settlement and the growth of the oil industry in Ponca City have often overshadowed both the long ancient history of indigenous peoples in the area, and those tribes who were resettled to Oklahoma in the 19th century under Indian Removal.

Ponca City is named after the Ponca tribe, part of whom were relocated from Nebraska to northern Oklahoma from 1877 to 1880. Like all of the forced American Indigenous removals of the 19th century, the Poncas' trek was arduous. Followed by the United States government's failure to provide adequate supplies and malaria at their destination, nearly one-third of the Ponca died from illness and exposure. "Out of 700 Ponca who left the Nebraska reservation, 158 died in Oklahoma within two years."

The Ponca protested their conditions. An additional irritant occurred upon the death of Standing Bear's oldest son in 1879. The chief had promised to bury him in his homeland, and about 60 Ponca accompanied him back to Nebraska. The U.S. Army was ordered to arrest them for having left the reservation, and they were confined to Fort Omaha. Most of the tribal members who left eventually returned to the reservation in Oklahoma. With the aid of prominent attorneys working pro bono, Standing Bear filed a writ of habeas corpus challenging his arrest. The case of Standing Bear v. Crook (1879) was a landmark decision in the U.S. District Court, where the judge ruled that Indians had the same legal rights as other United States citizens.

A statue of Standing Bear was erected in his honor at the intersection of Highway 60 and Standing Bear Parkway in Ponca City. In the late 20th century, the city developed a park and museum named in his honor. In addition to the Standing Bear Museum, the 63-acre park includes more than eight fully developed acres with off street parking, a one-acre pond and a walking trail.

The Ponca Nation, which has kept its headquarters south of Ponca City since 1879, played a major part in the development of the Marland Oil Company and the city. Chief White Eagle leased resource-containing portions of the tribe's allotted land to E.W. Marland in 1911 for oil exploration and development.

Since the late 20th century, the Ponca tribe has worked to build its infrastructure and improve services for its people. In February 2006, the tribe received a grant of more than $800,000 from the Shakopee Mdewakanton Sioux Community of Minnesota for debt retirement and economic development.

Nearby north-central tribes are the Kaw, Osage, Otoe-Missouria, Pawnee, and Tonkawa. These are all federally recognized tribes, as is the Ponca Tribe of Indians of Oklahoma. In 1994, the six tribes established the Standing Bear Foundation and Pow-wow, beginning the first of annual shared pow-wows, to which they invite the public. They wanted to build collaboration among the tribes and with the non-Native residents of Ponca City. The pow-wow is now held in Standing Bear Park.

== Geography ==
Ponca City is located in southeastern Kay County northwest of the Arkansas River. The city sits on roughly 47.6 km^{2} (18.4 sq mi) of land, and also has about 3.2 km^{2} (1.2 sq mi) of water, for a total area of 50.8 km^{2} (19.6 sq mi).

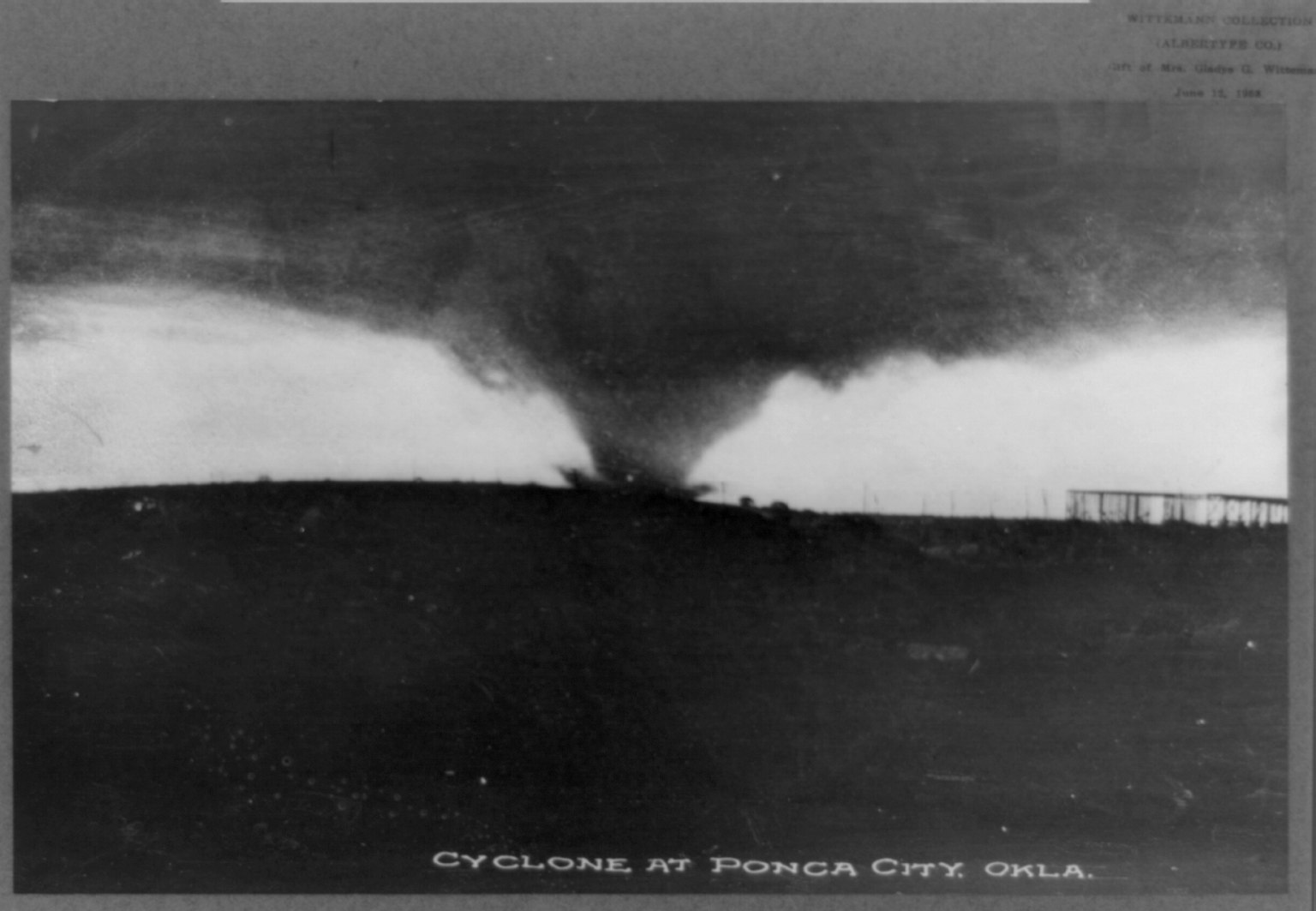
A historic photo of a wide tornado funnel taken near Ponca City between 1900 and 1920

The city is in north-central Oklahoma, around 21 mi (34 km) south of the Kansas border, and approximately 15 mi (24 km) east of Interstate 35.

The city is near the Arkansas River, the Salt Fork of the Arkansas River, Kaw Lake, and Lake Ponca, which all provide numerous recreational opportunities.

=== Climate ===
The Ponca City region of Oklahoma is part of "Tornado Alley". Tornadoes are most common in April, May, and June. Ponca City faces very hot and humid summers with temperatures frequently rising to over 100 °F (38 °C), as well as severe storms. During the winters, Ponca City has mild to cold temperatures with occasional snowstorms and ice.

Climate data for Ponca City, Oklahoma, 1991–2020 normals, extremes 1948–present
Month	Jan	Feb	Mar	Apr	May	Jun	Jul	Aug	Sep	Oct	Nov	Dec	Year
Record high °F (°C)	80 (27)	92 (33)	92 (33)	101 (38)	100 (38)	110 (43)	116 (47)	112 (44)	110 (43)	98 (37)	90 (32)	83 (28)	116 (47)
Mean maximum °F (°C)	69.7 (20.9)	76.0 (24.4)	82.8 (28.2)	87.9 (31.1)	92.3 (33.5)	98.1 (36.7)	103.0 (39.4)	102.6 (39.2)	97.8 (36.6)	89.6 (32.0)	78.6 (25.9)	70.0 (21.1)	104.6 (40.3)
Mean daily maximum °F (°C)	47.2 (8.4)	52.0 (11.1)	61.7 (16.5)	70.6 (21.4)	79.0 (26.1)	88.3 (31.3)	93.3 (34.1)	92.1 (33.4)	84.3 (29.1)	72.5 (22.5)	59.8 (15.4)	48.9 (9.4)	70.8 (21.6)
Daily mean °F (°C)	35.9 (2.2)	40.1 (4.5)	49.5 (9.7)	58.5 (14.7)	68.1 (20.1)	77.6 (25.3)	82.4 (28.0)	80.9 (27.2)	72.7 (22.6)	60.5 (15.8)	48.1 (8.9)	38.1 (3.4)	59.4 (15.2)
Mean daily minimum °F (°C)	24.6 (−4.1)	28.2 (−2.1)	37.3 (2.9)	46.4 (8.0)	57.2 (14.0)	67.0 (19.4)	71.4 (21.9)	69.7 (20.9)	61.1 (16.2)	48.4 (9.1)	36.4 (2.4)	27.4 (−2.6)	47.9 (8.8)
Mean minimum °F (°C)	8.1 (−13.3)	10.8 (−11.8)	18.7 (−7.4)	29.6 (−1.3)	40.5 (4.7)	54.5 (12.5)	61.6 (16.4)	58.3 (14.6)	44.8 (7.1)	30.1 (−1.1)	19.0 (−7.2)	10.6 (−11.9)	3.0 (−16.1)
Record low °F (°C)	−12 (−24)	−25 (−32)	−2 (−19)	19 (−7)	30 (−1)	44 (7)	50 (10)	49 (9)	28 (−2)	15 (−9)	8 (−13)	−10 (−23)	−25 (−32)
Average precipitation inches (mm)	1.02 (26)	1.10 (28)	2.17 (55)	3.78 (96)	5.10 (130)	4.70 (119)	3.70 (94)	3.28 (83)	2.74 (70)	3.06 (78)	1.65 (42)	1.27 (32)	33.57 (853)
Average snowfall inches (cm)	2.3 (5.8)	1.9 (4.8)	1.8 (4.6)	trace	0.0 (0.0)	0.0 (0.0)	0.0 (0.0)	0.0 (0.0)	0.0 (0.0)	trace	0.4 (1.0)	2.0 (5.1)	8.4 (21.3)
Average precipitation days (≥ 0.01 in)	4.8	4.9	6.9	8.2	10.4	8.7	7.4	7.5	6.9	6.8	5.1	4.6	82.2
Average snowy days (≥ 0.1 in)	1.8	1.5	0.9	0.1	0.0	0.0	0.0	0.0	0.0	0.1	0.3	1.7	6.4
Source 1: NOAA (snow/snow days 1981–2010)
Source 2: National Weather Service

== Demographics ==
Historical population
Census	Pop.	Note	%±
1900	2,528		—
1910	2,521		−0.3%
1920	7,051		179.7%
1930	16,136		128.8%
1940	16,794		4.1%
1950	20,180		20.2%
1960	24,411		21.0%
1970	25,940		6.3%
1980	26,238		1.1%
1990	26,359		0.5%
2000	25,919		−1.7%
2010	25,387		−2.1%
2020	24,424		−3.8%

=== 2020 census ===
As of the 2020 census, Ponca City had a population of 24,424. The median age was 38.0 years. 25.2% of residents were under the age of 18 and 19.4% of residents were 65 years of age or older. For every 100 females there were 94.3 males, and for every 100 females age 18 and over there were 92.5 males age 18 and over.

98.4% of residents lived in urban areas, while 1.6% lived in rural areas.

There were 9,975 households in Ponca City, of which 30.7% had children under the age of 18 living in them. Of all households, 41.6% were married-couple households, 20.0% were households with a male householder and no spouse or partner present, and 30.0% were households with a female householder and no spouse or partner present. About 32.3% of all households were made up of individuals and 15.5% had someone living alone who was 65 years of age or older.

There were 11,742 housing units, of which 15.0% were vacant. Among occupied housing units, 62.2% were owner-occupied and 37.8% were renter-occupied. The homeowner vacancy rate was 3.6% and the rental vacancy rate was 16.7%.

Racial composition as of the 2020 census
Race	Percent
White	70.2%
Black or African American	3.1%
American Indian and Alaska Native	9.7%
Asian	0.7%
Native Hawaiian and Other Pacific Islander	1.1%
Some other race	3.5%
Two or more races	11.6%
Hispanic or Latino (of any race)	9.7%

=== 2010 census ===
At the 2010 census, 25,387 people, 10,440 households and 7,019 families resided in the city. The population density was 1,431.0/sq mi (552.5/km^{2}). The 11,950 housing units were at an average density of 655.4/sq mi (253.1/km^{2}). The racial makeup of the city was 84.18% White, 2.99% African American, 6.27% Native American, 0.70% Asian, 0.03% Pacific Islander, 2.08% from other races, and 3.75% from two or more races. Hispanics or Latinos of any race were 4.43% of the population.

Of the 10,440 households, 25.4% had children under the age of 18 living with them, 51.3% were married couples living together, 11.1% had a female householder with no husband present, and 34.0% were not families. About 30.0% of all households were made up of individuals, and 13.7% had someone living alone who was 65 years of age or older. The average household size was 2.38 and the average family size was 2.95.

The population was distributed as 26.2% under of 18, 8.5% from 18 to 24, 25.5% from 25 to 44, 22.1% from 45 to 64, and 17.7% who were 65 years of age or older. The median age was 38 years. For every 100 females, there were 90.7 males. For every 100 females age 18 and over, there were 85.8 males.

The median household income was $39,023, and the median family income was $38,839. Males had a median income of $32,283 and females $20,098. The per capita income was $22,566. About 12.7% of families and 17.7% of the population were below the poverty line, including 23.6% of those under age 18 and 9.3% of those age 65 or over.

== Economy ==
E. W. Marland built the Ponca City refinery in 1918 and founded the Marland Oil Company. In 1929, the Continental Oil Company merged with Marland, and the two became Conoco Inc. The Conoco headquarters were in Ponca City until 1949, when they moved to Houston, Texas. In 2002, Conoco Inc. and Phillips Petroleum Company, whose headquarters were in nearby Bartlesville, Oklahoma, merged into ConocoPhillips. In 2012, ConocoPhillips split into two separate companies, with the upstream portion retaining the ConocoPhillips name and the refining and transportation portions taking the name Phillips 66. The Ponca City Refinery, operated by Phillips 66, is the largest refinery in Oklahoma.

The Ponca City Refinery processes a mixture of light, medium, and heavy crude oils. Most of the crude oil processed is received by pipeline from Oklahoma, Texas, and Canada. Infrastructure improvements have enabled the delivery of increased volumes of locally produced advantaged crude oil by pipeline and truck. The refinery is a high-conversion facility that produces a full range of products, including gasoline, diesel, aviation fuels, liquefied petroleum gas, and anode-grade petroleum coke. Its facilities include two fluid catalytic cracking units, alkylation, delayed coking, naphtha reforming, and hydrodesulfurization units. Finished petroleum products are shipped by truck, railcar, and pipelines to markets throughout the Midcontinent region.

== Tourism ==
=== Sports ===
Ponca City hosted minor league baseball from the 1920s through the 1950s. The Ponca City Poncans played in 1924, the Ponca City Angels played from 1934–1938 (winning three Western Association championships), and the Ponca City Dodgers (an affiliate of the Brooklyn Dodgers) operated from 1947–1952. The Ponca City Jets played in the Western Association in 1954, only to be replaced in 1955 by a new club in the Sooner State League called the Ponca City Cubs. The Ponca City Cubs played through 1957, the last season of professional baseball in Ponca City.

=== Points of interest ===
- 101 Ranch Memorial
- Cann Memorial Botanical Gardens
- Kaw Lake
- Marland Grand Home
- E. W. Marland Mansion
- Pickens Museum
- Ponca Tribe headquarters
- Standing Bear Memorial
- Ponca City Concert hall

=== Landmarks ===
Ponca City is home to several landmarks on the National Register of Historic Places, including the Poncan Theatre, the Marland Mansion, and Marland's Grand Home. Ponca City also holds several regional events each year.

On September 17, 2024, the National Park Service announced that the Ponca City and Kay County were jointly named a World War II Heritage City.

=== Pioneer Woman statue and museum ===
The Pioneer Woman statue was modeled by sculptor Bryant Baker and was unveiled in a public ceremony on April 22, 1930.

Ponca City is the site of the Pioneer Woman Museum and the Pioneer Woman statue. The statue was erected to commemorate women pioneers. In the early 1920s, E. W. Marland decided to create a statue commemorating the pioneer woman. Marland was reportedly asked, "E. W., why don't you have ... a statue to the vanishing American, a Ponca, Otoe, or an Osage - a monument of great size?" Marland answered, "the Indian is not the vanishing American - it's the pioneer woman." He sponsored a competition for the winning statue.

In 1927, miniature 3 feet (0.9 m) sculptures were submitted as part of a competition by 12 U.S. and international sculptors: John Gregory, Maurice Sterne, Hermon Atkins MacNeil, James Earle Fraser, Alexander Stirling Calder, Wheeler Williams, Mario Korbel, F. Lynn Jenkins, Mahonri Young, Arthur Lee, Jo Davidson, and Bryant Baker. They were displayed in 12 cities around the state, where they were viewed by 750,000 people, who voted for their favorite. The original submissions have been on display at the museum at Woolaroc near Bartlesville, Oklahoma since the 1930s. Marland sold them to Frank Phillips after losing control of the Marland Oil Company.

British-born American sculptor Bryant Baker was chosen as the winner. His full-scale work was unveiled in a public ceremony on April 22, 1930. About 40,000 guests came to hear Will Rogers pay tribute to Oklahoma's pioneers. The statue is 27 feet (8.2 m) high and weighs 12,000 lb. Widely known as the Pioneer Woman Statue, the bronze sculpture's true name is "Confident".

A related museum commemorating Oklahoma women was opened on September 16, 1958, on the 65th anniversary of the Cherokee Strip land run. It recognizes the work of Native American, as well as European-American women, and their leadership and stamina in creating homes, raising children, and taking care of the work of sustaining life and communities.

== Education ==
=== Public education ===
Ponca City High School

Ponca City Public Schools serves the general population's education requirements in almost all of the city limits. Ponca City Public Schools serve over 5100 students.

High schools
- Ponca City High School (Po-Hi) - serves all 9th- through 12th-grade students in the school district.
- Ombudsman Alternative Education Center had provided select students the option to take a mostly technology-based route through high school. It was closed after the end of the 2012-2013 academic year.
- WildCat Academy Program, starting in the 2013–2014 academic year, became the new alternative school for high school students in the area. Sponsoring the Ponca City WildCat logo, it incorporated changes from the Ombudsman and past alternative schools.
Middle schools
- East Middle School serves Ponca City's estimated 380 eighth-grade students in the Ponca City Public School system.
- West Middle School serves most of the district's sixth- and seventh-grade students.
Elementary schools

Ponca City has currently eight elementary schools to serve the district's pre-K through fifth-grade students:

- Garfield Elementary
- Liberty Elementary
- Lincoln Elementary
- Roosevelt Elementary
- Trout Elementary
- Union Elementary
- McCord Elementary (has a sixth grade )
- Washington Elementary became the Alternative School, but was closed at the end of the 2009-2010 school year. The school later reopened in 2015 as an elementary school.
- Woodlands Elementary

Small sections of the Ponca City city limits are zoned to Kildare Public School.

=== Private education ===
Ponca City has three private schools that serve students from pre-K through eighth grade:

- Ponca City Christian Academy
- First Lutheran School
- St. Mary's Catholic School (Roman Catholic Archdiocese of Oklahoma City)

=== Higher education ===
- Pioneer Technology Center serves high school and adult students from throughout the surrounding area. PTC also has co-operative degree programs with Northern Oklahoma College and Cowley County Community College
- University Center (UC) at Ponca City offers interactive television classes from several area universities, including Northern Oklahoma College and Northwestern Oklahoma State University. In 2018, the UC began an ambitious project seeking to create STEM opportunities for younger students to encourage a higher-education pursuit. In December 2018, Phillips66 awarded the UC an $85,000 grant for the purchase of additional robotics kits and equipment to further develop the UC's STEM initiatives.

Research facilities

- Ponca City is the headquarters for Oklahoma State University's University Multispectral Laboratory.

== Infrastructure ==
=== Electricity ===
The Ponca City region receives electricity generated hydroelectrically at Kaw Lake, a United States Army Corps of Engineers project. The facility, located 7 mi (11 km) east of Ponca City, dams the Arkansas River. The electric utility is managed by the Oklahoma Municipal Power Authority (OPMA) of Edmond, Oklahoma.

=== Transportation ===
The city is accessible by I-35, US-60, US-77, US-177 and OK-11.

On Grand Avenue (Business US-60), a series of new lamp posts is intended to look more classic. This project also replaced every traffic light along Grand Avenue except the traffic signals at 14th St. and at Waverly to match the new lamp posts.

==== Airports ====
Ponca City Regional Airport (airport code PNC/KPNC) (1007 feet above mean sea level) is located at the northwest corner of the city at 36°43.84'N and 97°5.99'W. The facility has a 7,201-ft 17-35 runway, which is 150 ft (46 m) wide, and the facility has a full-length taxiway but no tower. The local airport booster club hosts a fly-in breakfast every first Saturday of the month, year around, "rain or shine".

Commercial air transportation is available out of Stillwater Regional Airport about 40 miles to the south, Wichita Dwight D. Eisenhower National Airport about 89 miles to the north, or Tulsa International Airport about 101 miles to the southeast.

== Notable people ==
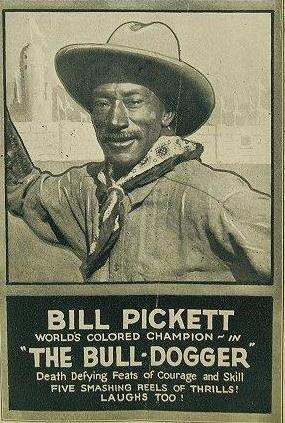
Bill Pickett's image on a handbill advertising the movie "The Bull-Dogger," released in 1921 by The Norman Film Manufacturing Company. Pickett was billed as "the world's colored champion" in "death-defying feats of courage and skill."

- Douglas Blubaugh, 1960 Olympic gold medalist in freestyle wrestling
- Mike Boettcher, news correspondent, CNN and NBC
- Lou Clinton, Major League Baseball (MLB) player
- June Cobb, CIA informant
- Don Coleman, offensive lineman in College Football Hall of Fame
- Stanley Ann Dunham, mother of U.S. President Barack Obama
- Terry Forcum, 1983 World Champion professional long drive golfer
- Randy 'Raygun Busch' Heyer, lead singer of Chat Pile
- Richard E. Killblane, military historian and author
- Jon Kolb, former offensive lineman with Pittsburgh Steelers
- Candy Loving, Playboy model, January, 1979, magazine's 25th-Anniversary Playmate
- E. W. Marland, businessman and politician
- Gale McArthur, All-American basketball player at Oklahoma State University

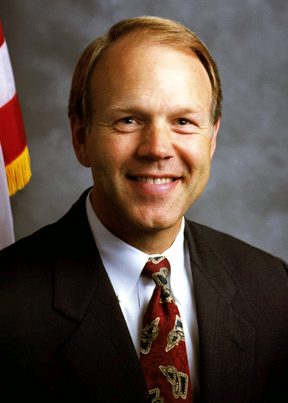
Former U.S. Senator Don Nickles

- W. H. McFadden, oilman and philanthropist
- Jake McNiece (1919–2013), a US Army paratrooper in World War II, was the leader of the Filthy Thirteen, an elite demolition unit whose exploits inspired the novel and movie The Dirty Dozen.
- Don Nickles, former United States Senator
- Gayla Peevey, child singer ("I Want a Hippopotamus for Christmas")
- Bill Pickett, cowboy
- Don Puddy, NASA flight director
- Mark and Rusty Ryal, father and son MLB players
- Kareem Salama, country and western singer
- Clint Sodowsky, MLB player
- Standing Bear, Poncan Native American leader
- Anthony Taylor, Catholic bishop of the diocese of Little Rock, Arkansas
- Joyce Carol Thomas, children's author
- Marilyn Vann, Cherokee Nation engineer and activist
- Lew Wentz, oilman and philanthropist
- Shelby Wilson, 1960 Olympic gold medalist in freestyle wrestling
- Waddy Young Walter Roland Young 1916 - 1945 An All-American football player with the Brooklyn Dodgers (NFL) who volunteered to fly the B-29 in World War II

== Gallery ==
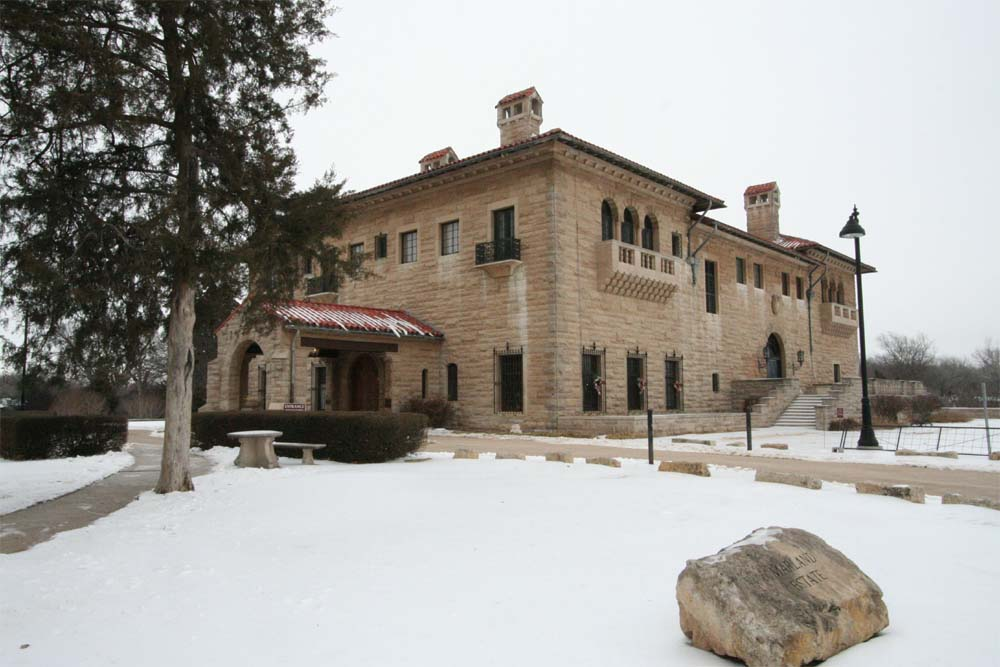
The Marland Mansion

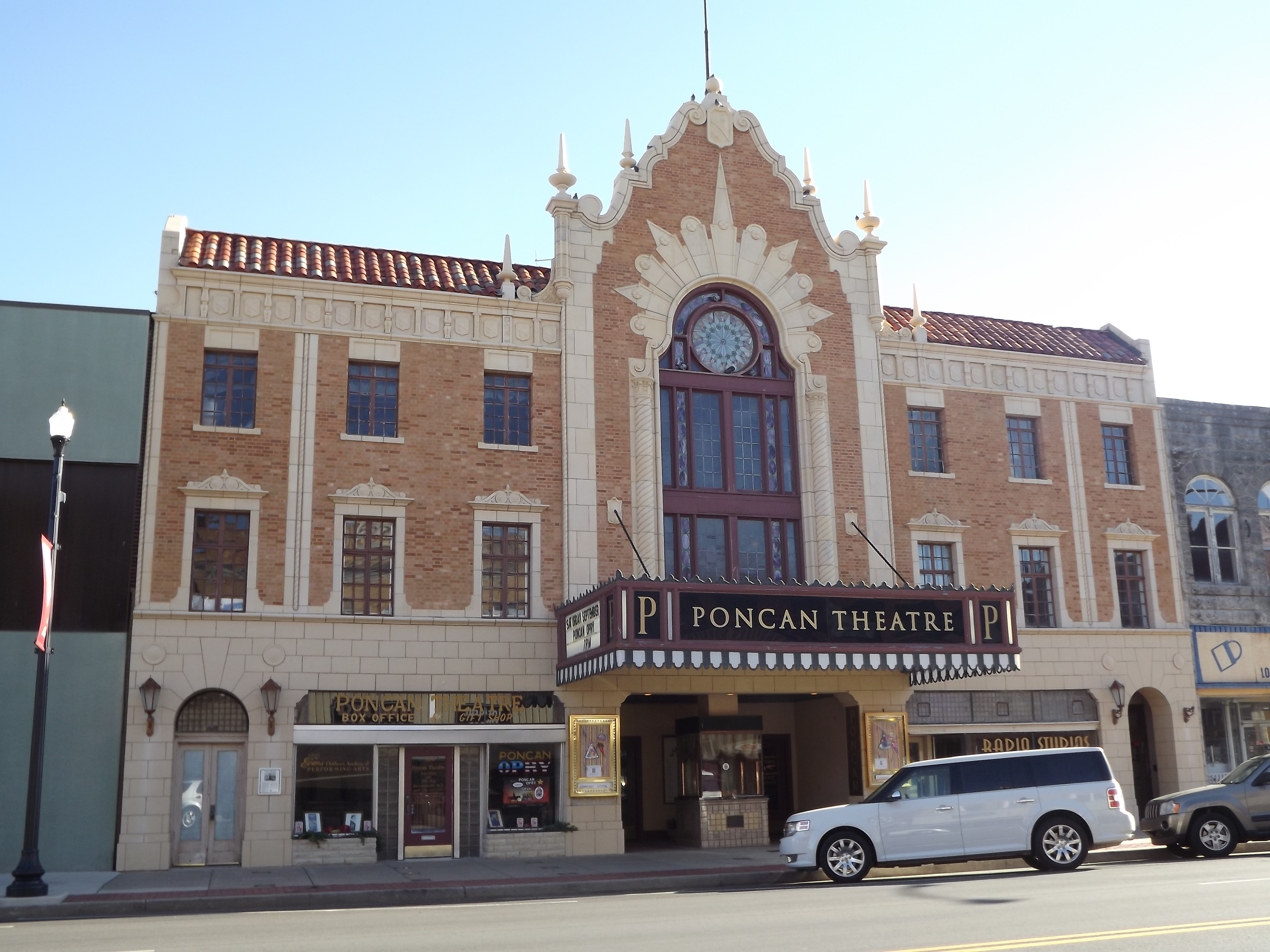
The Poncan Theatre was built in 1927

== In popular culture ==
Ponca City was one of the filming locations for 1996 movie Twister.

Several scenes of the television series American Gods were shot in Ponca City.

The 2020 children’s film Adventures of Rufus: The Fantastic Pet was largely filmed at the Marland Mansion.

A film about E. W. Marland was expected to be in production to shoot in Ponca City, titled The Ends of the Earth. The film was to star the Academy Award winner Jennifer Lawrence, and was originally expected to start in 2014. However, as of May 2023, Internet Movie Database continues to list the movie only as "in development."

== Sister cities ==
- Baiyin, Gansu, China

== See also ==
- List of oil refineries
