= Hawkeye =

Hawkeye may refer to:

== Places ==
=== United States ===
- Hawkeye, Iowa, a city
- Hawkeye, Kansas, a small settlement in Kansas
- Hawkeye, Missouri, an unincorporated community
- Hawkeye Point, the highest natural point in Iowa
- Iowa, a state nicknamed the "Hawkeye State"

== Arts and entertainment ==
=== Book and comic characters ===
- Natty Bumppo or Hawkeye, a character in James Fenimore Cooper's 1826 novel The Last of the Mohicans: A Narrative of 1757
- Hawkeye (Clint Barton), the first Marvel Comics character to use the name
- Hawkeye (Kate Bishop), the second Marvel Comics character to use the name
- One of the main characters in the Hawkeye Collins and Amy Adams, children's book series
- An agent of The Shadow
- Riza Hawkeye, a character in Fullmetal Alchemist
- Dracule "Hawkeye" Mihawk, a character in One Piece
- Hawkeye Pierce, a character in Richard Hooker's 1968 novel MASH: A Novel About Three Army Doctors

=== Film and television ===
- Hawkeye (film), a 1988 action film starring George Chung
- Hawkeye (1994 TV series), focusing on the Natty Bumppo character
- Hawkeye (miniseries), centered on the Marvel Comics character
- Benjamin Franklin "Hawkeye" Pierce, one of the main characters in the M*A*S*H franchise
- "Hawkeye" (M*A*S*H episode), an episode of the TV series
- "Hawkeye" (Marvel Studios: Legends), an episode of Marvel Studios: Legends

=== Video games ===
- Hawkeye (Seiken Densetsu 3), a character in Seiken Densetsu 3
- Hawkeye, a SAM vehicle in Military Madness: Nectaris
- Hawkeye, a character in Fire Emblem: The Blazing Blade

=== Music ===
- "Hawkeye", an instrumental on the 1985 Alan Parsons Project album Vulture Culture

== Nickname ==
- Dragutin Matić (1888-1970), nicknamed Hawkeye, Serbian scout in two Balkan Wars and the First World War
- Giora Epstein (born 1938), retired colonel in the Israeli Air Force
- Monty "Hawkeye" Henson (born 1953), American three-time world champion saddle bronc rider
- Ken Lee (RAF officer) (1915–2008), British Second World War flying ace
- Timber Hawkeye (born 1977), author of Buddhist Boot Camp
- Tom Webster (ice hockey) (born 1948), Canadian ice hockey player and coach
- Charles Whitney (born 1957), American former professional basketball player and convicted kidnapper
- Jack Womer (1917–2013), decorated American World War II veteran and a member of the Filthy Thirteen

== Other uses ==
- Northrop Grumman E-2 Hawkeye, a US Navy early warning aircraft
- HMMWV Hawkeye, a 105-mm mobile howitzer produced by AM General
- The Hawk Eye, a newspaper in Burlington, Iowa
- The Hawkeye, a 1923 novel by Herbert Quick
- Hawkeye (brand), a professional videocassette brand
- Hawkeye (spirits), a brand of liquor sold by Luxco
- Hawkeye Transfer Company Warehouse, listed on the National Register of Historic Places in Polk County, Iowa
- Red Delicious or Hawkeye apple, a type of apple
- Iowa Hawkeyes, sports teams of the University of Iowa
- Hawkeye Open, a golf tournament in Iowa City, Iowa, from 1991 to 1993
- Hawkeye Community College, a community college, with its main campus located just outside Waterloo, Iowa
- Ruger Hawkeye, a single-shot pistol
- Ruger M77, a bolt-action rifle

== See also ==
- Hawk-Eye, a tracking system used in cricket, Gaelic football, hurling, tennis and other sports
- Hawkeye State, a nickname for the state of Iowa
- The Hawkeye Initiative, a Tumblr page that places the fictional comic character Hawkeye in poses held by female characters
- Hawk's Eye (Sailor Moon), a member of the Amazon Trio in the Sailor Moon series
- Hawk's eye, a gemstone which is a variant of Tiger's Eye
