= Amy Adams (disambiguation) =

Amy Adams (born 1974) is an American actress.

Amy Adams may also refer to:

- Amy Adams (politician) (born 1971), New Zealand politician
- A. Elizabeth Adams or Amy Elizabeth Adams (1892–1962), American zoologist
- Amy Adams Strunk (born 1955), American businesswoman, controlling owner of the Tennessee Titans
- Amy Adams (born 1979), American singer who was a finalist on the third season of American Idol
- Amy Adams, founder of Adams Childrenswear
- Amy Adams or Amy Games, wife of Lord Chief Justice John Popham
- One of the main characters in the Hawkeye Collins and Amy Adams children's book series
