= Jack Womer =

American World War II veteran and member of the Filthy Thirteen

- Born: June 18, 1917; Lewistown, Pennsylvania, U.S.
- Died: December 28, 2013 (aged 96); Dundalk, Maryland, U.S.
- Military career
- Allegiance: United States
- Branch: United States Army
- Service years: 1941–1945
- Rank: Sergeant
- Nickname: "Hawk Eye"
- Units: 29th Ranger Battalion; 101st Airborne Division; 506th Parachute Infantry Regiment
- Conflicts: Second World War; Normandy Invasion (Operation Overlord); Operation Market-Garden; Battle of the Bulge
- Awards: Legion of Honour; Bronze Star; Bastogne Medal; Honorable Service Lapel button Sharpshooter Badge

National Order of the Legion of Honour
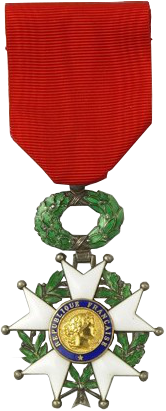
- Knight medal of the French Légion d'honneur

Jack Neitz Womer (18 June 1917 – 28 December 2013) was a decorated American World War II veteran and a member of the Filthy Thirteen demolition unit who was known for his World War II exploits. Womer was a member of the 29th Ranger Battalion, the 101st Airborne Division and the 506th Parachute Infantry Regiment (506th PIR).

Throughout his service in the 101st Airborne Division, Womer was assigned to the Demolitions Platoon of the 506th PIR Regimental Headquarters Company in the section known officially as the First Demolitions Section and nicknamed the Filthy Thirteen. Known for his astuteness in battle, which he attributed to his rigorous training by British Commandos while in the 29th Ranger Battalion, Womer was never injured in combat.

Womer was among the members of the Filthy Thirteen who parachuted into Normandy, France, on 6 June 1944 as part of the Normandy Invasion (Operation Overlord). He was the only one that remained in the Filthy Thirteen and participated in Operation Market-Garden in September 1944, the Battle of the Bulge in December 1944, and the advance on Hitler's home in Berchtesgaden, Germany, in 1945. At the time of his death on December 28, 2013, Womer was the last living member of the original Filthy Thirteen. In May 2012, Womer's biography, Fighting With the Filthy Thirteen: The World War II Story of Jack Womer: Ranger and Paratrooper, co-written by close friend Stephen C. DeVito, was published.

== Personal life ==
Womer was born on 18 June 1917 in Lewistown, Pennsylvania, as the fourth child of Methodist parents— mainly of Dutch descent. His father, William Walker (“Walk”) Womer, worked as an open-hearth melter in a steel mill in Lewistown. Womer's mother, Roxie Womer, was a housewife. A few months after Womer was born, Roxie became ill and sent Womer to Sunbury, Pennsylvania, to live with her sister Dolsie. In 1922, Womer was still living in Sunbury with his aunt; his father decided to move the family from Lewistown, Pennsylvania to a small row house in Sparrows Point, Maryland. In 1930 the eight-member Womer family relocated to a larger, single family house in Dundalk, Maryland.

Womer attended public and private schools. He was quite athletic and was awarded an athletic scholarship to attend the Franklin Day School, a private high school in Baltimore, Maryland, where he enjoyed dancing in nightclubs. During the late 1930s Womer was known as the best jitter-bugger in Baltimore, and was nicknamed “jitterbug”. Womer began his employment in 1936 at Bethlehem Steel and, except for the four-and-a-half years he served in the military during World War II, continued working there until he retired in 1982.

Womer married Theresa Cook in November 1945 in Saint Patrick's Catholic Church in Baltimore. They remained married until Theresa's death in 1987. They had two children; a son, John, and a daughter, Ellen. John died in the early 1990s. Soon after Theresa's death, Womer moved from their home in Dundalk to a single family house in Fort Howard, Maryland. Womer died at 96 years of age on 28 December 2013.

== Military service ==
Womer was drafted into the U.S. Army on 25 April 1941. He was assigned to the 175th Infantry Regiment, Company C, of the 29th Infantry Division. From April to September 1941, he trained with the 29th Infantry Division at Fort Meade, Maryland. A year later, the Division was sent to Europe by sea. Approximately half of the Division was sent in late September 1942 on the Queen Mary. In early October 1942, Womer and the rest of the Division were sent to Europe on the Queen Elizabeth. The 29th Infantry Division billeted him at Tidworth Barracks, an old military camp in Wiltshire, England, and he continued to undertake training exercises.

=== 29th Provisional Ranger Battalion ===
In late November or early December 1942, it was announced that a new Ranger battalion, the 29th Provisional Ranger Battalion, was to be formed within the 29th Infantry Division. Men for the new battalion were chosen from the 29th Infantry Division, and soldiers within the Division interested in being considered for it were asked to volunteer. Only those volunteers who met the very strict physical and psychological requirements would be allowed to try out for the battalion. Womer was among the relatively few volunteers who passed the initial screenings and were allowed to continue with the training. The 29th Provisional Ranger Battalion volunteers trained in the Tidworth area from December 1942 until late January 1943.

In late January 1943, the volunteers were sent to Scotland for five weeks of intensive training under combat experienced British Commando instructors at Glen Spean. Womer and other volunteers who completed the training officially became 29th Rangers and were sent back to England. Womer said this training was the most brutal he ever experienced, but credited it for enabling him to think strategically and tactically during combat, and saving his life and the lives of others.

In early September 1943, Womer was asked to go to the British Commando Depot at Dorlin House in Acharacle, Argyll, to assist in the training of Ranger recruits. For nearly three weeks, he trained with other British Commando and Royal Marine units in amphibious assault landings at six very tough assault courses. In October 1943, the 29th Provisional Ranger Battalion was disbanded and the men returned to their original units within the 29th Infantry Division. Womer returned to Company C of the 175th Infantry Regiment.

=== 101st Airborne Division and the Filthy Thirteen ===
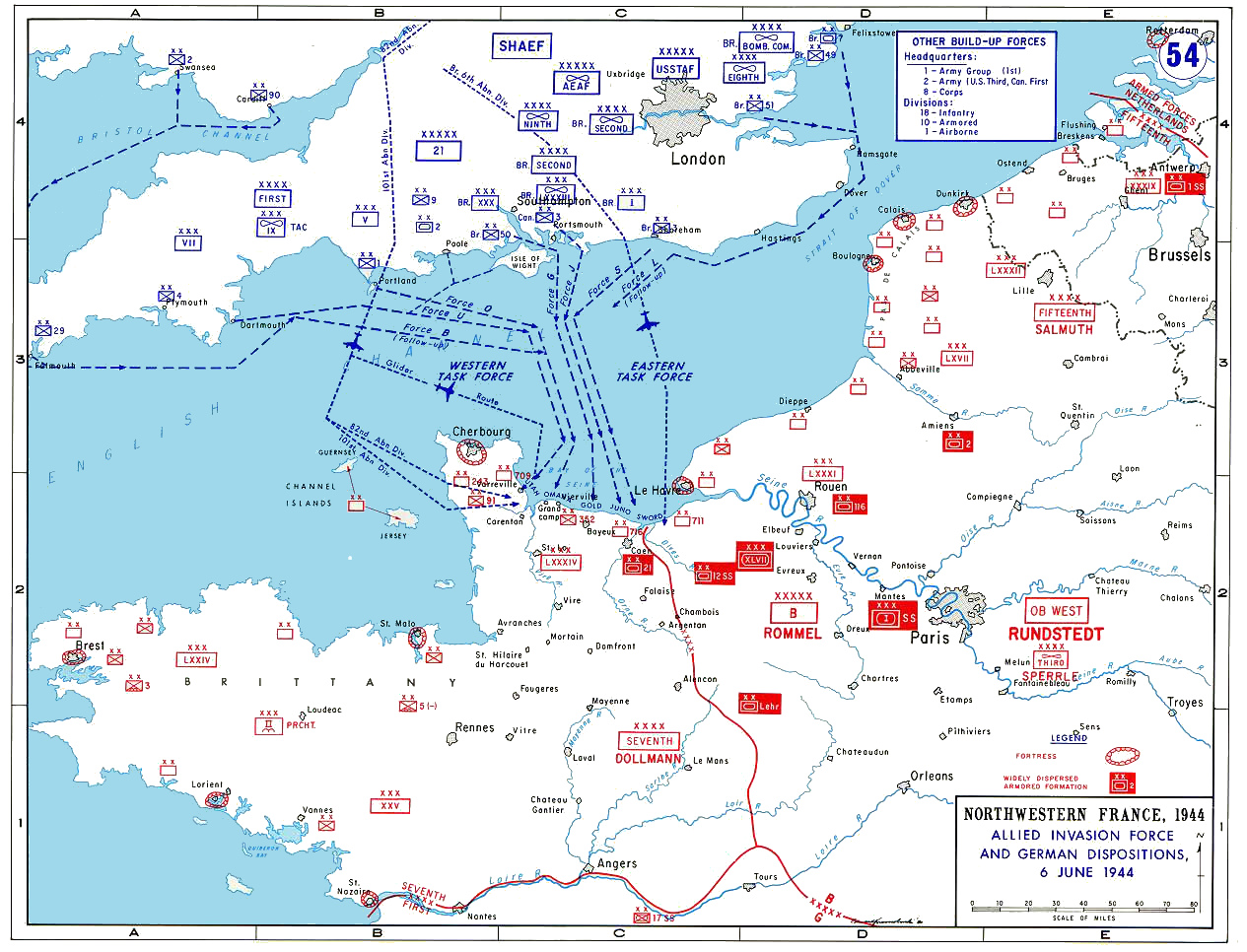
D-day assault routes into Normandy.

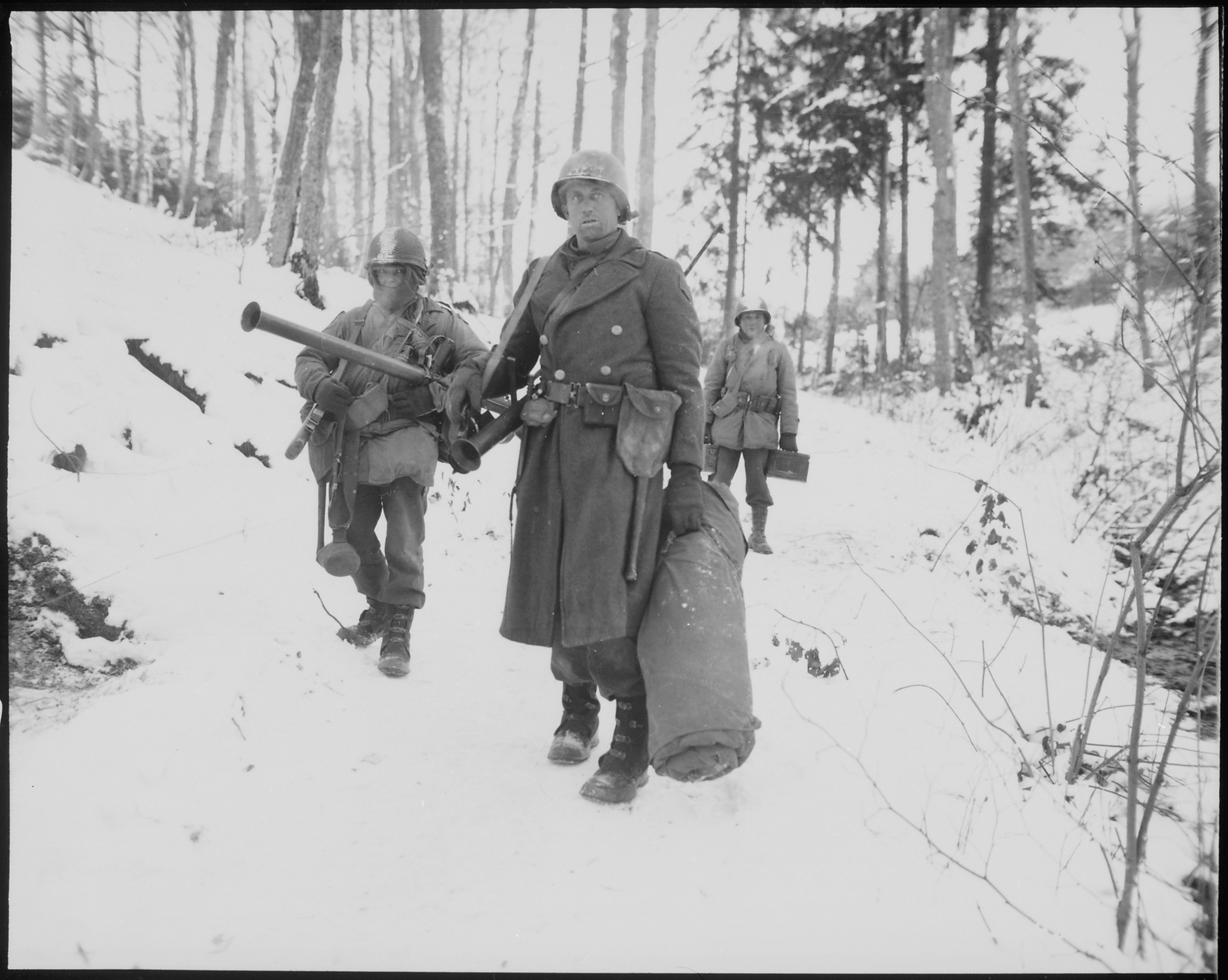
Americans of the 101st Engineers near Wiltz, Luxembourg, January 1945.

Shortly after he returned to Company C of the 175th Infantry Regiment, Womer wanted to be reassigned to a more elite unit. He volunteered to become a paratrooper with the 101st Airborne Division. Womer had heard that William Myers, a Rangers sergeant, had also joined the 101st Airborne Division. Knowing Myers had been assigned to the Demolitions Platoon within the Regimental Headquarters Company of the 101st Airborne Division's 506th Parachute Infantry Regiment, Womer joined the Demolitions Platoon.

The Demolitions Platoon was composed of three sections. Myers was in a section that was already complete but the First Demolitions Section—known as the Filthy Thirteen—was short of men. Jake McNiece, the buck sergeant of the Filthy Thirteen, had heard that Womer was trained as a Commando and had been in the 29th Ranger Battalion. Impressed with Womer's credentials, McNiece requested his assignment to the Filthy Thirteen.

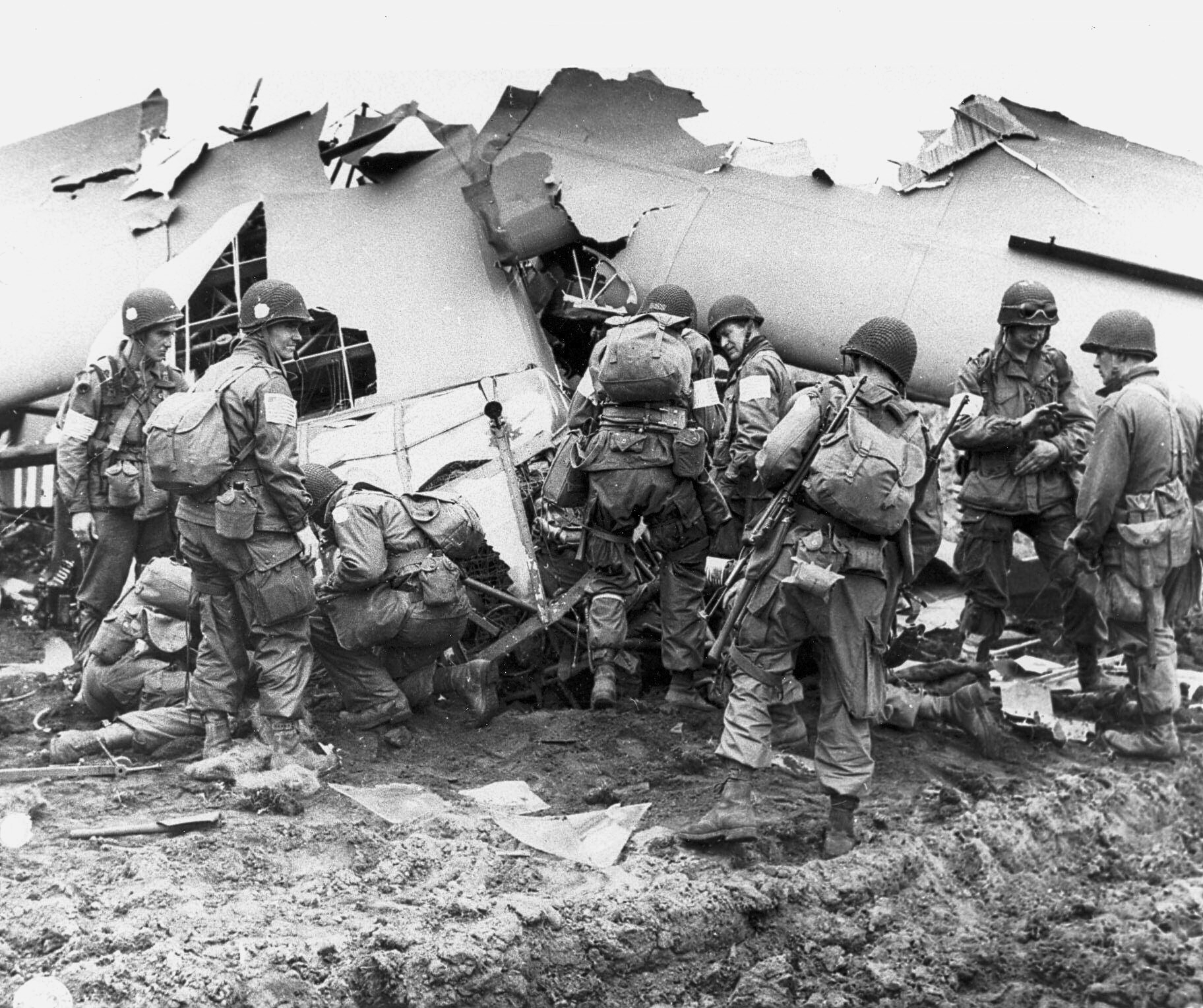
101st Airborne Paratroopers inspect a broken glider.

With the Filthy Thirteen, Womer participated in Operation Overlord, and later in Operation Market-Garden and the Battle of the Bulge. Womer relied heavily on his Commando training during these battles; he credits it with his own survival and enabling him to keep many other men from being killed. After Jake McNiece left the Filthy Thirteen in December 1944, Womer was promoted to buck sergeant to fill McNiece's position, which he maintained at the outset of the Battle of the Bulge in December 1944 until the end of the war. Womer was the only member of the Filthy Thirteen to participate in the Normandy Invasion, Operation Market-Garden, the Battle of the Bulge, and to advance on Adolf Hitler’s home in Berchtesgaden, Germany, while a member of the Filthy Thirteen.

== Post-World War II ==
Womer was discharged from the military in September 1945. He returned to his parents' home in Dundalk and to his job at Bethlehem Steel in Sparrows Point. In November 1945 he married his fiancée, Theresa Cook. He retired in 1982 after more than forty years at Bethlehem Steel. In June 2003, Womer was contacted by Stephen C. DeVito, after DeVito obtained an original photograph of Womer with six other men taken in February 1943, when they were training to become 29th Rangers. Womer and DeVito became friends and co-wrote Womer's biography, Fighting with the Filthy Thirteen, which was published in May 2012 by Casemate Publishing.

== Awards and recognitions ==
Womer received many medals and decorations from the United States government for his military service. In 2012, out of gratitude for his military service, people in France petitioned the French government to award him the French Legion of Honor medal, the highest medal awarded by the French government. Womer was awarded the medal in June 2013 during a formal ceremony held in Carentan, France.

- The Legion of Honor
- The Honorable Service Lapel button
- The Sharpshooter Badge
- The Bronze Star
- Bastogne Medal

== Bibliography ==
- Womer, Jack N.; DeVito, Stephen C (2012). Fighting With the Filthy Thirteen, the World War II Story of Jack Womer: Ranger and Paratrooper. Casemate Publishers. ISBN 9781612001005.
- Richard Killblane; Jake McNiece (2003). The Filthy Thirteen: The True Story of the Dirty Dozen. Presidio Press. ISBN 9781932033120.
- Richard Killblane; Brian Miller (2013). War Paint: The Filthy Thirteen Jump into Normandy and Beyond.
- Richard Killblane; Jake McNiece (2006). The Filthy Thirteen: From the Dustbowl to Hitler's Eagle's Nest - The True Story of the 101st Airborne's Most Legendary Squad of Combat Paratroopers. Casemate Publishers. ISBN 978-1932033465.
- E.M. Nathanson (2001). The Dirty Dozen. Cassel. ISBN 9780304359288.
