= Larry Dahl =

Lawrence or Larry Dahl may refer to:

- Larry G. Dahl (1949–1971), US Army veteran and Medal of Honor recipient
- Lawrence F. Dahl (born 1929), professor emeritus of chemistry at the University of Wisconsin–Madison

== See also ==
- Dahl (surname)
