= Jake McNiece =

American soldier (1919–2013)

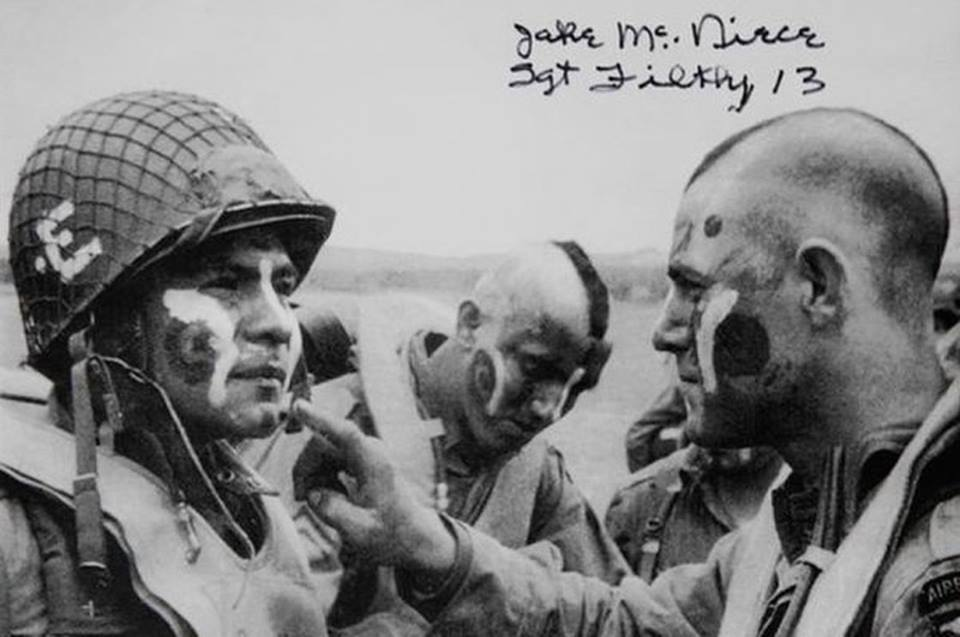
- Autographed photo of Jake Mcniece (right) applying face paint to another soldier.
- Born: May 24, 1919; Maysville, Oklahoma, U.S.
- Died: January 21, 2013 (aged 93); Chatham, Illinois, U.S.
- Military career
- Allegiance: United States
- Branch: United States Army
- Service years: 1942–1946
- Rank: First Sergeant (acting only)
- Nickname: "McNasty"
- Units: 506th Parachute Infantry Regiment; 101st Airborne Division
- Conflicts: See battles: World War II; Normandy landings; Operation Market Garden; Siege of Bastogne; Prüm
- Awards: Bronze Star (4); Purple Heart (2); Legion of Honour

James Elbert "Jake" McNiece (May 24, 1919 – January 21, 2013) was a US Army paratrooper in World War II. Private McNiece was a member and eventual leader of the Filthy Thirteen, an elite demolition unit whose exploits inspired the 1965 E. M. Nathanson novel and the 1967 film The Dirty Dozen.

== Early life ==
James McNiece was born on May 24, 1919, in Maysville, Oklahoma, the ninth of ten children born to Eli Hugh and Rebecca (née Ring) McNiece, and of Irish American and Choctaw descent. During the Depression, the family moved to Ponca City, Oklahoma in 1931. In 1939, he graduated from Ponca City High School and went to work in road construction, and then at the Pine Bluff Arsenal, where he gained experience in the use of explosives.

== Military career ==
McNiece enlisted for military service on September 1, 1942. He was assigned to the demolition saboteur section of what was then the 506th Parachute Infantry Regiment. This section became the Filthy Thirteen, first led by Lieutenant Charles Mellen, who was killed in action on June 6, 1944, during the Invasion of Normandy. Following Mellen's death, Private McNiece led the unit.

McNiece's deliberate disobedience and disrespect during training prevented him from being promoted past Private when most Paratroopers were promoted to Private First Class after 30 days. McNiece would act as section sergeant and first sergeant through various missions. His first sergeant and company commanders knew he was the man the regiment could count on during combat. His escapades are documented in his words in The Filthy Thirteen, Fighting With the Filthy Thirteen, and War Paint: The Filthy Thirteen Jump Into Normandy.

McNiece went on to make a total of four wartime combat jumps, the first as part of the Invasion of Normandy in 1944. In the same year he jumped as part of Operation Market Garden in the Netherlands, which was featured in the book (and subsequent film) A Bridge Too Far, and at the Siege of Bastogne, part of the larger Battle of the Bulge. During fighting in the Netherlands, he acted as demolition platoon sergeant. He volunteered for pathfinder training, anticipating he would sit out the rest of the war training in England, but his pathfinder stick was called upon to jump into Bastogne to guide in resupply drops.

His last jump was on 13 February 1945, near Prüm, Germany to resupply the cut-off 90th Infantry Division. In recognition of his natural leadership abilities, he ended the war as the acting first sergeant for Headquarters Company, 506th Parachute Infantry Regiment. McNiece would be kicked out of the military in February 1946 after one last fight with MPs.

== After World War II ==
In 1946 McNiece traveled the U.S. with his father for about 6 months before settling in California doing railroad and construction work. In 1949, McNiece returned to live in Ponca City. He began a 28.5-year career with the United States Postal Service. He met Rosita, a widowed mother. Rosita died in 1952 and, a year later, he married Martha Beam Wonders. They had two sons and a daughter and remained married until his death.

== Last years ==
In 1997, historian Richard E. Killblane, also from Ponca City, began recording Jake's oral history of his escapades during the war and wrote The Filthy Thirteen, which Casemate Publishers published in 2003. This made Jake an instant celebrity among World War II airborne fans and he toured the United States and Europe educating and entertaining younger generations with his accounts of the war. In 2012, McNiece was awarded the French Legion of Honour Chevalier class. He died on January 21, 2013, at the age of 93. His wife Martha would die in 2015.

== Military Awards ==
- Combat Infantryman Badge
- Parachutist Badge with four combat jump stars
- Pathfinder Badge
- Bronze Star Medal with Combat "V" and three oak leaf clusters
- Purple Heart with oak leaf cluster
- Good Conduct Medal
- American Campaign Medal
- European-African-Middle Eastern Campaign Medal with arrowhead device and four campaign stars
- World War II Victory Medal
- Army of Occupation Medal with "Germany" clasp
- Chevalier of the Legion of Honor (France)
- Five Overseas service bars

== Other honors ==
McNiece was an inductee in the Oklahoma Military Hall of Fame, and an honorary colonel of the 95th Victory Division. He was the recipient of an honorary master's degree in Military Science from Cumberland University in Lebanon, Tennessee. He had participated in military maneuvers there in 1943. In 2010, an action figure of McNiece was released. In 2017, he was among the first class inducted into the Ponca City High School Hall of Fame.

== See also ==
- 101st Airborne Division
- 506th Infantry Regiment

== Bibliography ==
- Womer, Jack N.; DeVito, Stephen C (2012). Fighting With the Filthy Thirteen, the World War II Story of Jack Womer: Ranger and Paratrooper. Casemate Publishers. ISBN 9781612001005.
- Richard Killblane; Jake McNiece (2003). The Filthy Thirteen: The True Story of the Dirty Dozen. Casemate Publishers. ISBN 9781932033120.
- Richard Killblane; Brian Miller (2013). War Paint: The Filthy Thirteen Jump into Normandy and Beyond. Victory Press. ISBN 978-0-615-67993-8.
- Richard Killblane; Jake McNiece (2006). The Filthy Thirteen: From the Dustbowl to Hitler's Eagle's Nest - The True Story of the 101st Airborne's Most Legendary Squad of Combat Paratroopers. Casemate Publishers. ISBN 978-1932033465.
- Jerome Preisler (2014). First to Jump; How the Band of Brothers Was Aided by Brave Paratroopers of the Pathfinder Company. Berkley. ISBN 978-0425265970.
- E.M. Nathanson (2001). The Dirty Dozen. Cassel. ISBN 9780304359288.
- Maurin Picard (2016). Des héros ordinaires; Au coeur de la Seconde Guerre mondiale. Perrin. ISBN 9782262051372.
