= Schmitt and Henry Manufacturing Company =

- U.S. National Register of Historic Places
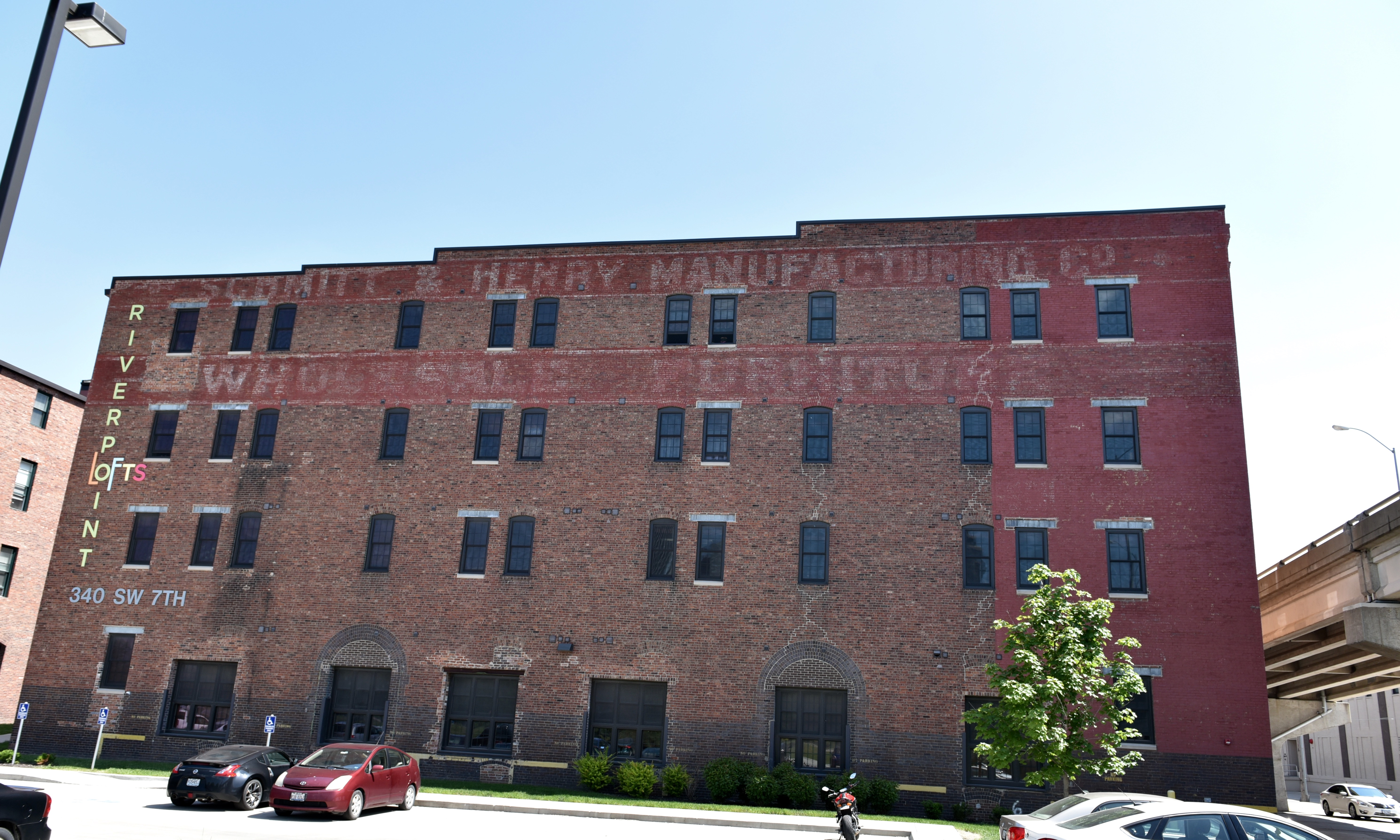

- Location within Iowa Location within the United States
- Location: 309 SW 8th St. Des Moines, Iowa
- Coordinates: 41°34′49.5″N 93°37′29.7″W
- Area: less than one acre
- Built: 1901-1914
- Architect: Proudfoot, Bird and Rawson
- Architectural style: Early Commercial; Classical Revival
- NRHP reference No.: 10000078
- Added to NRHP: March 17, 2010

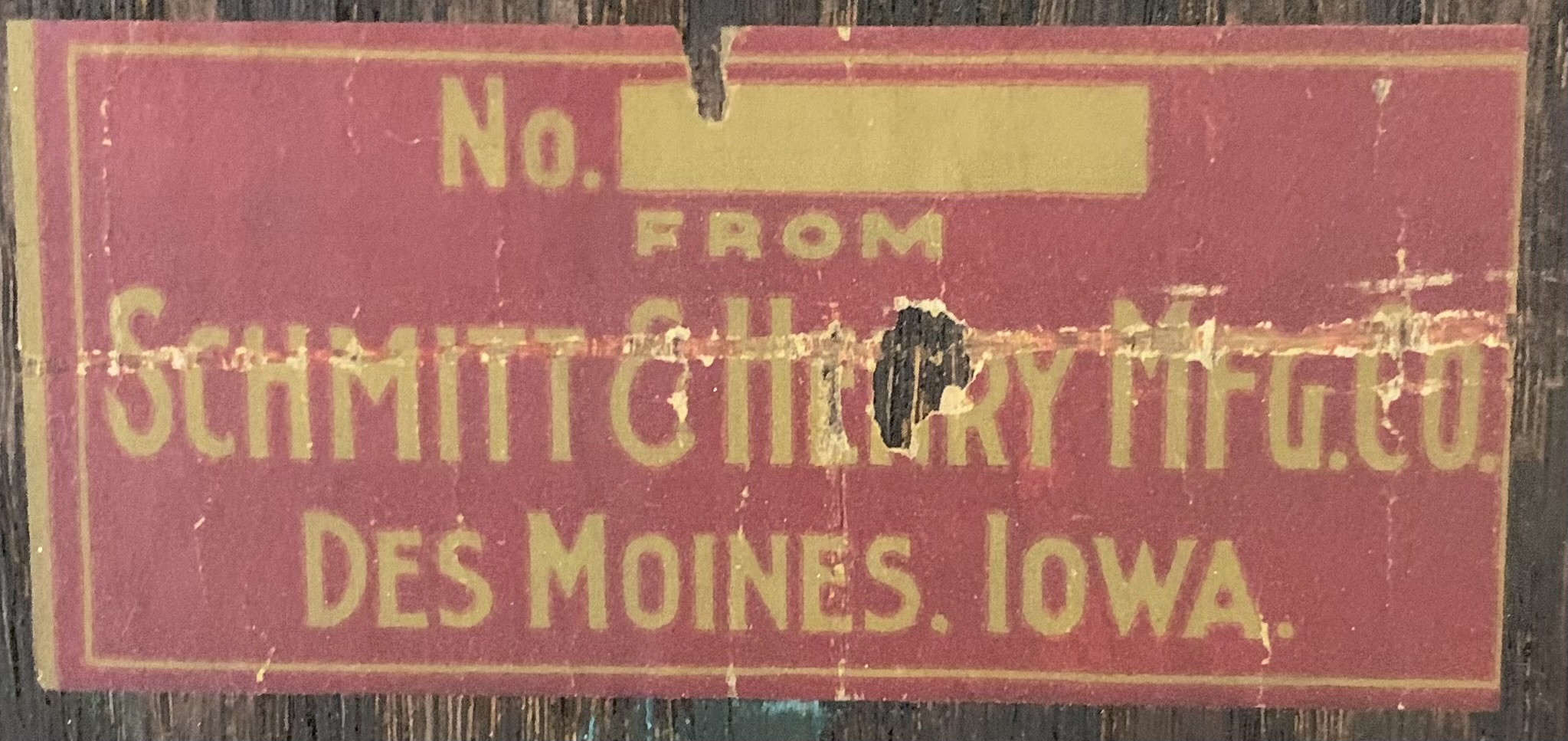
Schmitt & Henry Mfg. Co. Furniture Label

The Schmitt and Henry Manufacturing Company is a complex of three historic buildings located in downtown Des Moines, Iowa, United States. The complex was built in three stages from 1901 to 1914 by Schmitt-Henry, who manufactured furniture. It was designed by Des Moines architect Harry D. Rawson of the firm Proudfoot, Bird and Rawson. Sealy Mattress Company took over the building in 1973 after Schmitt-Henry moved to West Des Moines. Hubbell Reality purchased the complex in 1994 for $75.000. Plans were approved in 2009 to convert the complex, as well as the Hawkeye Transfer Company Warehouse, into loft apartments. It was listed on the National Register of Historic Places in 2010.
