= Filthy Thirteen =

Demolition unit of the US Army in WWII

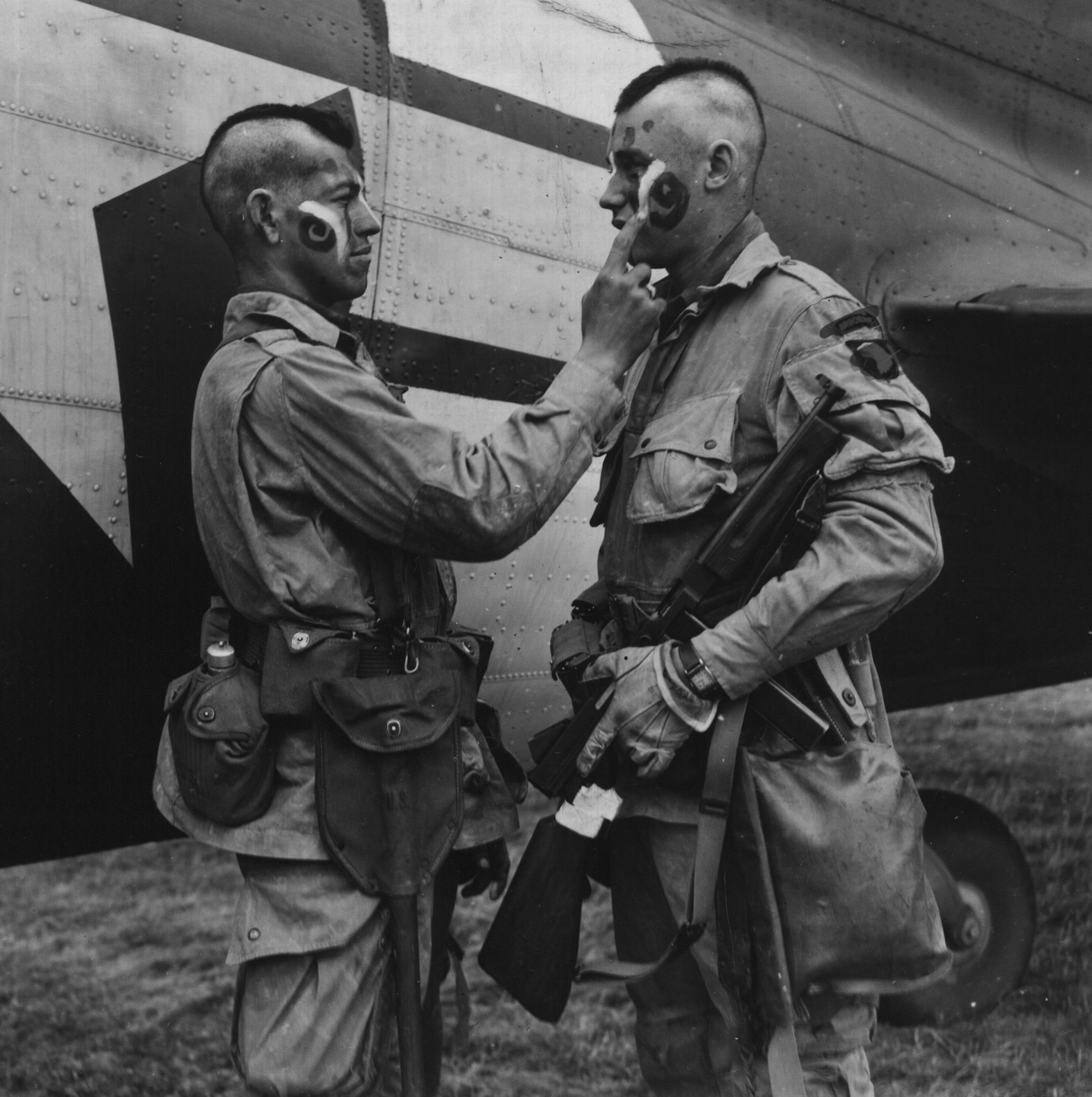
Filthy Thirteen member Clarence Ware applies war paint to Charles Plauda, June 5, 1944. The idea was McNiece's, to honor his Native American heritage and to energize the men for the danger ahead.

The Filthy Thirteen was the name given to the 1st Demolition Section of the Regimental Headquarters Company of the 506th Parachute Infantry Regiment, 101st Airborne Division, of the United States Army, which fought in the European campaign in World War II. This unit was the inspiration for the 1965 E. M. Nathanson novel and 1967 film The Dirty Dozen.

== History ==
The 1st Demolition Section was assigned and trained as demolition saboteurs to destroy enemy targets behind enemy lines. Inspired by Sergeant Jake McNiece, the unit had a tremendous mission focus, but their disregard for aspects of military discipline that did not contribute to the mission became the bane of their officers. The 13-man unit acquired the nickname the Filthy Thirteen while living in Nissen huts in England, refusing to bathe during the week in order to use their water ration for cooking game poached from the neighboring manor. Photos of the men wearing Native American–style "mohawks" and applying war paint to one another excited the public's interest in this unit. The inspiration for this came from McNiece, who was part Choctaw.

During the Normandy Invasion of Europe in June 1944, the group was airdropped with the 3rd Battalion, 506th Parachute Infantry Regiment by aircraft of the 440th Troop Carrier Group of the United States Army Air Forces. They were ordered to secure or destroy the bridges over the Douve River. Half were killed, wounded, or captured on the jump, but the rest, led by McNiece, accomplished their mission. Most of the 3rd Battalion leadership had been killed on the jump, so without any contact with the 3rd Battalion, senior officers assumed the battalion had failed its mission and ordered the Air Force to bomb the bridges. The Filthy Thirteen also helped capture Carentan.

During Operation Market Garden, the Demolition Platoon was assigned to defend the three bridges over the Dommel River in Eindhoven, the Netherlands. German bombing of the city killed or wounded half the demolitions men in the platoon, and McNiece was promoted to platoon sergeant of what was left. Jack Womer took his place as section sergeant. For the rest of the campaign, the demolitions men secured the regimental command post or protected wire-laying details. On one occasion, the survivors of the Demolitions Platoon were assigned as a rifle squad to an understrength company.

After coming back from being AWOL in Paris after Market Garden, McNiece volunteered for the Pathfinders, thinking he would never make another combat jump. These were paratroopers sent in ahead of the main force to guide them in or guide in resupply drops. Half the surviving members of the original Filthy Thirteen followed him into the Pathfinders, thinking they would sit out the rest of the war training in England. To their surprise, they parachuted into the encircled town of Bastogne at the height of the Battle of the Bulge. Anticipating casualties as high as 80–90%, the 20 pathfinders lost only one man. Their CRN-4 beacon enabled them to guide in subsequent airdrops of supplies crucial to the continued resistance of the trapped 101st Airborne Division.

McNiece considered that any activities not directly concerned with his mission were irrelevant, an attitude that got him in constant trouble with the military authorities. Nevertheless, McNiece finished the war as an acting first sergeant and with four combat jumps, a rare feat for an American paratrooper. His combat jumps included Normandy, the Netherlands as part of Operation Market Garden, the pathfinder jump into Bastogne during the Battle of the Bulge, and as an observer with the 17th Airborne Division during Operation Varsity.

Of the activities of the Filthy Thirteen, one of the unit's members Jack Agnew once said: "We weren't murderers or anything, we just didn't do everything we were supposed to do in some ways and did a whole lot more than they wanted us to do in other ways. We were always in trouble."

== Members ==
Name	Status	Notes
Jack Agnew	W.I.A, Normandy	Bastogne Pathfinder
Jake McNiece		Bastogne Pathfinder
John Dewey		Bastogne Pathfinder
Max Majewski		Bastogne Pathfinder
William Coad		Bastogne Pathfinder
George Baran	W.I.A, Normandy	
Roland "Frenchy" R. Baribeau	K.I.A, Normandy	
Robert S. "Ragsman" Cone	P.O.W, Normandy	
Charles "Maw" Darnell	P.O.W, Normandy	
James F. "Piccadilly Willy" Green	P.O.W, Normandy	
James E. "LaLa" Leech	P.O.W, Normandy	
Charles "Trigger" Gann	P.O.W. Bastogne	
John "Peepnuts" Hale	K.I.A, Normandy	
Louis "LouLip" Lipp	W.I.A, Normandy	
Thomas "Old Man" Lonergan		
Miguel "Mike" Marquez		
Lieutenant Charles Mellen	K.I.A, Normandy	
Frank "Shorty" Mihlan		Transferred to HQ
John H. "Dinty" Mohr		
Joseph "Joe" Oleskiewicz	K.I.A, Holland	
Frank Palys		
Herb "Herby" Pierce		
Charles "Chuck" Plauda		
George "GoogGoo" Radeka	K.I.A, Normandy	
Andrew "Andy" Rasmussen	W.I.A, Normandy	
Brincely Stroup		Injured in Practice Jump, Pre-Invasion
Clarence Ware		
Jack "Hawkeye" Womer		
Tom Young		

The list includes original members from 1943 and the newer members during Operation Overlord and Operation Market Garden. An interview with Jake McNiece and Jack Agnew can be found on the two disc version of the Dirty Dozen DVD. Jack Agnew died aged 88 on 8 April 2010. Jake McNiece died aged 93 on 21 January 2013. Jack Womer died aged 96 on 28 December 2013.

== Literature and cultural influence ==
The 101st Airborne Division issued a press release on the unit, but war correspondents embellished the story. War correspondent Tom Hoge wrote the first article about these paratroopers and coined the name "The Filthy Thirteen" in an article for the Stars and Stripes, June 9, 1944, "Filthy Thirteen Squad Rivaled by None in Leaping Party." Hoge would again use the name "Filthy Thirteen" in July 1944, in an article published in the Seminole County News: "No one knows yet just what happened to the Filthy Thirteen. But all agree on one thing. Pity the poor Nazi who encounters them."

Arch Whitehouse wrote an article for True magazine that had some of the myths that would eventually find their way into E. M. Nathanson's book The Dirty Dozen which was the basis of the 1967 film of the same name. Whitehouse claimed the original 12 members were full blood Indians who had sworn not to bathe until they jumped into combat and it required their new lieutenant to beat each one in a fight in order to win their respect. This addition of this new member changed their name from the Dirty Dozen to the Filthy Thirteen. E. M. Nathanson was informed by a friend, Russ Meyer, who worked on documentaries for the war about a unit of condemned prisoners who were sent on a suicide mission—more likely one of the Filthy Thirteen myths.

Searching the archives of condemned prisoners, Nathanson found no evidence of such a unit (more likely since he was searching the wrong path), but used the information gathered for his novel published in 1965, which was later turned into a blockbuster movie in 1967. Barbara Maloney, the daughter of John Agnew, told the American Valor Quarterly that her father felt that 30% of the movie's content was historically correct, including a scene where officers are captured. Unlike the Dirty Dozen, the Filthy Thirteen were not convicts; however, they were men prone to drinking and fighting and often spent time in the stockade.

Richard E. Killblane wrote Jake McNiece's version of the unit in The Filthy Thirteen (2003), and Stephen DeVito wrote Jack Womer's version in Fighting with the Filthy Thirteen; The World War II Story of Jack Womer – Ranger and Paratrooper (2012). Killblane followed up both books with a more accurate history of the unit that included nearly all surviving member's accounts in War Paint; The Filthy Thirteen Jump into Normandy (2013). Jerome Preisler wrote an account of the Bastogne jump in his history of the World War II pathfinders, First to Jump; How the Band of Brothers was Aided by the Brave Paratroopers of the Pathfinder Company, in 2014. The Filthy Thirteen has been translated into French, Swedish and Spanish. Maurin Picard included a chapter about Jake McNiece and the Filthy Thirteen in his book, Des Héros Ordinaires; Au coeur de la Seconde Guerre mondiale (The Ordinary Heroes of the Second World War) published in 2016.

Constantine Nsar produced a documentary, "The Filthy Thirteen, Real Stories Behind the Lines," with interviews of Jake McNiece and Richard Killblane for a DVD release of "The Dirty Dozen" in 2006.

The cover of War Paint; The Filthy Thirteen Jump into Normandy shows a copy of a commissioned painting by Joel Iskowitz, depicting the Filthy Thirteen getting ready for their jump into Normandy. The Stephens County Currahee Military Museum in Toccoa, Georgia commissioned a bronze bust of Jake McNiece. Réal Desmarets commissioned a memorial to the 3rd Battalion, 506th Parachute Infantry Regiment and Filthy Thirteen at Brevands, France (their D-Day mission). It includes a bronze statue of a kneeling member of the Filthy Thirteen.

== See also ==
- Pathfinder (military)
- The Dirty Dozen
