= Larry G. Dahl =

United States Army soldier (1949–1971)

Larry Gilbert Dahl
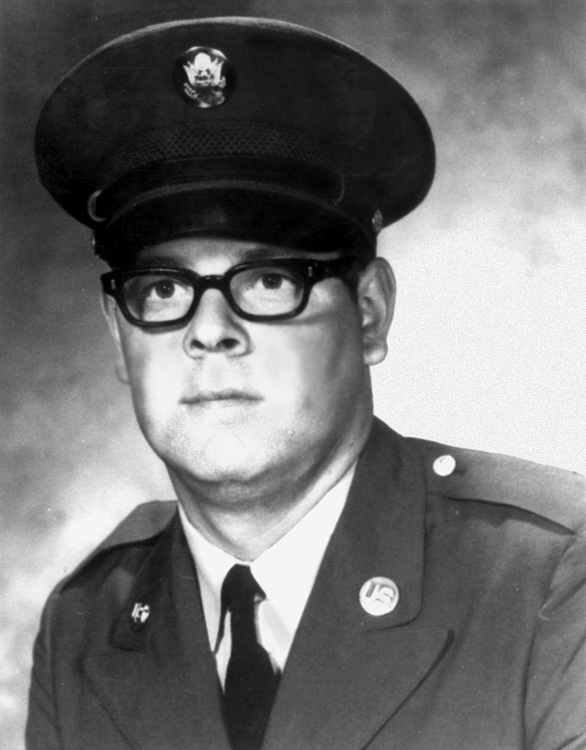
- Specialist Four Larry Dahl
- Born: 1949; Oregon City, Oregon, U.S.
- Died: February 23, 1971 (aged 21) near An Khe, Binh Dinh Province, Republic of Vietnam
- Burial place: Willamette National Cemetery, Portland, Oregon
- Military career
- Allegiance: United States
- Branch: United States Army
- Service years: 1969–1971
- Rank: Specialist Four
- Units: 359th Transportation Company, 27th Transportation Battalion
- Conflicts: Vietnam War †
- Awards: Medal of Honor; Purple Heart

Larry Gilbert Dahl (June 10, 1949 – February 23, 1971) was a United States Army soldier and a recipient of the United States military's highest decoration—the Medal of Honor—for his actions in the Vietnam War.

== Biography ==
Dahl joined the Army from Portland, Oregon in 1969, and by February 23, 1971, was serving as a Specialist Four in the 359th Transportation Company, 27th Transportation Battalion, U.S. Army Support Command. He along with Richard Bond, Ronald Mallory and Charles Huser had become friends with the crew of the gun truck, Brutus, and helped clean the truck every time it came off the road. The current crew said that if anything happened to them, they wanted those four men to take their place. On November 21, 1970, Brutus was hit by either rockets or mortars killing Jimmy Ray Callison and wounding William Kagel & Ernest Quintana. The gun truck was turned over to their good friends who cleaned it up and repainted it - they wanted the enemy to see no signs of damage.

On February 23, 1971, two fuel convoys headed west on QL 19 from Qui Nhon. Richard Bond had the day off and SGT Hector Diaz had taken his place as the NCOIC of Brutus. The lead fuel convoy escorted by gun trucks of the 545th Transportation Company was ambushed as it crossed over the top of An Khe Pass by a significantly large enemy force. The 359th convoy at the bottom of the pass halted and the gun trucks asked if the lead convoy needed help. So Brutus, The Untouchable, The Misfits and gun jeep Li'l Brutus raced up the mountain pass into the kill zone in that order. The ambush had probably been going on for over 30 minutes when the gun truck crews in the lead convoy heard the mini gun of Brutus firing as it came around the bend. Morale significantly improved. Ron Mallory pulled Brutus right up next to a burning fuel tanker as was their policy. The fight continued for about another 15 minutes before it then died down.

Thinking it was over, Brutus and The Misfits decided to turn around and head back to their convoy. As Ron Mallory backed his truck up to turn around, three or four enemy soldiers attacked it and tossed a hand grenade in the gun box. Larry Dahl saw it first and without any regard for his own safety threw his body on it to protect his buddies. The resulting explosion killed him and wounded Diaz and Huser. Mallory raced his truck to the safety of the nearest check point to get his crew medevacked. Vietnam gun truck veterans cite Dahl's ultimate sacrifice as evidence of the strong bond among gun truck crews.

Dahl, aged 21 at his death, was buried in Willamette National Cemetery in Portland, Oregon.

== Medal of Honor citation ==
Specialist Dahl's official Medal of Honor citation reads:

Sp4c. Dahl distinguished himself by conspicuous gallantry and intrepidity while serving as a machine gunner on a gun truck near An Khe, Binh Dinh Province. The gun truck in which Sp4c. Dahl was riding was sent with 2 other gun trucks to assist in the defense of a convoy that had been ambushed by an enemy force. The gun trucks entered the battle zone and engaged the attacking enemy troops with a heavy volume of machine gun fire, causing a large number of casualties. After a brief period of intense fighting the attack subsided. As the gun trucks were preparing to return to their normal escort duties, an enemy hand grenade was thrown into the truck in which Sp4c. Dahl was riding. Instantly realizing the great danger, Sp4c. Dahl called a warning to his companions and threw himself directly onto the grenade. Through his indomitable courage, complete disregard for his safety, and profound concern for his fellow soldiers, Sp4c. Dahl saved the lives of the other members of the truck crew while sacrificing his own. Sp4c. Dahl's conspicuous gallantry, extraordinary heroism, and intrepidity at the cost of his life, above and beyond the call of duty, are in keeping with the highest traditions of the military service and reflect great credit on himself, his unit and the U.S. Army.

== See also ==
- List of Medal of Honor recipients for the Vietnam War
- USNS Dahl (T-AKR-312), named in his honor.
- Circle the Wagons, The History of US Army Convoy Security, Richard E. Killblane, Combat Studies Institute, 2006
- Convoy Ambush Case Studies Vol. I, Korea and Vietnam, Richard E. Killblane, US Army Transportation School, 2014
