= Hawkeye (spirits) =

Distilled beverage brand by Luxco of St. Louis, Missouri

Hawkeye Vodka

Hawkeye is a brand of distilled beverages made by Luxco of St. Louis, Missouri. Hawkeye is marketed towards residents of Iowa, which is known as "the Hawkeye State". Products sold under the Hawkeye name include blended whiskey, rum, gin, flavored vodka, and the most popular product – vodka.

In Iowa, as of February 2012, Hawkeye vodka is the top-selling vodka and the #3 best selling liquor brand, and the Hawkeye whiskey blend and light rum brands rank #65 and #72, respectively. Hawkeye vodka is distilled in St. Louis, Missouri, and is known for its low price.

In late 2010, it was reported that alcohol consumption in Iowa was climbing, and that some consumers were shifting their preferences toward lower-priced products as the result of recent economic conditions, and in early 2011, Luxco announced plans to expand operations in response to the increased sales.
