= Richard E. Killblane =

American military historian and author

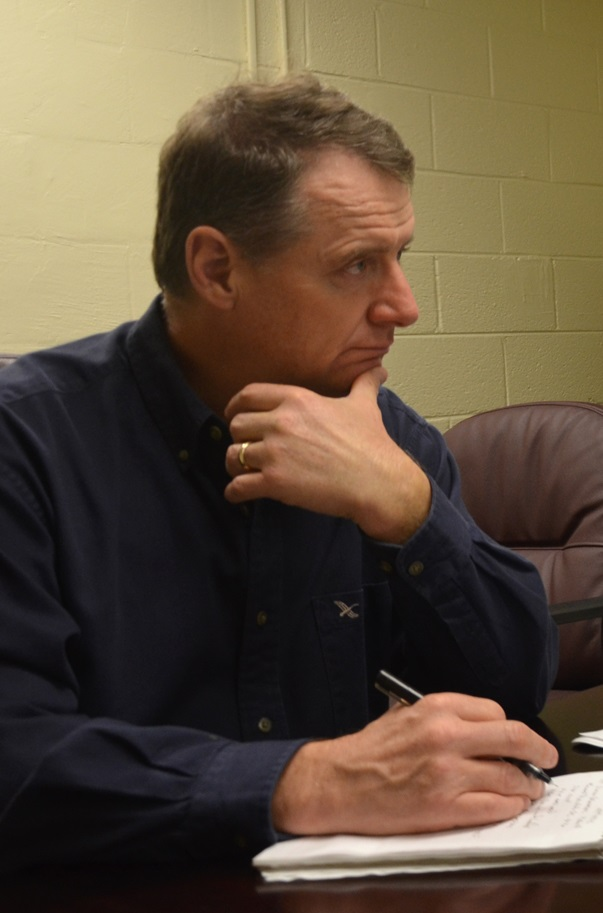
- Killblane in 2016
- Born: April 15, 1955 (age 71); Kansas, U.S.
- Military career
- Allegiance: United States of America
- Branch: United States Army
- Service years: 1973–1990
- Commands: Company Commander, 2nd Battalion, 9th Infantry Regiment; Operational Detachment A, 2nd Battalion, 7th Special Forces Group (Airborne)
- Conflicts: Operation Just Cause, Operation Iraqi Freedom, Operation Enduring Freedom

Richard Eldon Killblane (born April 15, 1955) is an American military historian, author and martial arts instructor. A West Point grad in 1979 and a graduate of the U.S. Army Ranger School. He served as an enlisted man and officer in the U. S. Army in the infantry and Special Forces. Killblane is a veteran of Central American counter-insurgency and Operation Just Cause. He served as the Command Historian of the U.S. Army Transportation School at Fort Lee, Virginia for 19 years and traveled extensively in Iraq and Afghanistan to research convoy operations. He has published numerous articles and books on military history and is considered an authority on military convoy security. In 2003, Killblane co-authored, with Jake McNiece, The Filthy Thirteen: The True Story of the Dirty Dozen, detailing the life and World War II 101st Airborne Division exploits of McNiece.

== Military service ==
Born in Kansas and raised in Oklahoma, Richard Killblane graduated from Ponca City High School in 1973. He enlisted in the U.S. Army in 1973 and became an Intelligence Analyst in the 1st Special Forces Group on Okinawa, Japan at the end of the Vietnam War and was cross-trained onto a team as a demolitions man for one mission before his unit was inactivated. He was selected to attend the U. S. Military Academy Preparatory School and then was appointed to West Point in 1975. He is a graduate of the U.S. Army Ranger School.

Killblane was commissioned as an infantry lieutenant in 1979 upon graduation from West Point. He was assigned to the 8th Infantry Division (Mechanized) in West Germany during the Cold War from 1980 to 1982. However, he soon joined the 7th Special Forces Group where he trained Honduran and three El Salvadoran battalions in counter-insurgency operations. He then served as a war planner on 1st Special Operations Command staff from 1985-1986 where he originated the Army special operations concept for contingency operations in Haiti that would come to fruition in 1994 during Operation Uphold Democracy. As a captain, Killblane was transferred to Fort Ord, California where he commanded a rifle company in the 2nd Battalion, 9th Infantry Regiment (Manchus). After command, he became a 7th Infantry Division (Light) war planner for military operations in Panama, both Nimrod Dancer and Just Cause. After serving 11 years as an officer in the Infantry and Special Forces, Killblane left active duty in 1990, having served at every level from private soldier, to company commander to joint task force.

== Historian ==
He earned his MA in History at the University of San Diego in 1992 with the goal to teach soldiers how to use history. He hoped to bring originality to his research and analysis. His thesis, Indian Fighting in the Frontier West, described that the Army did have a doctrine for campaigning against Indians even though most scholars subscribed to Dr. Robert M. Utley's prevailing theory that it did not. During his freelance years, he met Jake McNeice and began writing The Filthy Thirteen. This began his fascination with the human perspective of war. He later became Assistant Command Historian at the U.S. Air Force Technical Applications Command in 1999, and in 2000, he accepted the position of Command Historian for the US Army Transportation Corps.

While serving as command historian, Killblane traveled five times to Kuwait and Iraq, twice to Afghanistan from 2005 to 2009, and finally to Haiti in 2010 during the earthquake response to gain an operational understanding of military logistics. He then joined the ranks of less than a dozen federal historians to deploy to the war zones in Iraq and Afghanistan. His in depth research into convoy operations during Operation Iraqi Freedom and Operation Enduring Freedom incorporated his firsthand experience of riding on convoys in Iraq and Afghanistan with his scholarly research on Vietnam War convoys making him the leading authority on gun trucks and convoy security. He subsequently authored four books on the subject. He also wrote a study that transformed the last remaining railroad operating battalion into the expeditionary railway center with an advisory capability, and authored the white paper that defined its capability. He finally retired from the Department of the Army in 2019 and Delivering Victory became the culmination of 19 years of research as the Army Transportation Corps Historian and his close association with the logistics branches. In this work, he described how four major logistical operations defined by three logistical functions shaped the conduct of other military operations. As a leading logistics historian, he has published a number of works on military logistics.

== Martial Arts ==
Killblane began his martial arts training with boxing and wrestling while in high school and then studied Taekwondo and Hapkido under Son Duk-sung and Sang Soo "Tiger" Kim at West Point, and later Sil Seo Young in the Army. During his last year at West Point, he won the brigade boxing championship. His combatives training in the Army taught him some judo and jujitsu. He began training in aikido under Doug Hanson, a senior student of Hiroshi Ikeda and Mitsugi Saotome, in 1996. He then studied under Pat Crosby, a senior student of Akira Tohei, in 2003. When Crosby moved away in 2011, Killblane became the head instructor of Virginia Aikikai and continued his training under Jim Baker, a student of Yoshimitsu Yamada and Hal Lehrman. In 2019, Killblane began studying how aikido would work against other martial arts in response to a YouTube challenge by Rokas Leonivicious to prove that aikido would work against other martial arts. He has produced a number of videos on YouTube demonstrating this.

== Bibliography ==
- The Filthy Thirteen, Richard E. Killblane and Jake McNiece, Casemate. 2003
- Mentoring and Leading: The Career of Lieutenant General Edward Honor, Richard E. Killblane, US Army Transportation School, 2003
- Circle the Wagons, The History of US Army Convoy Security, Global War on Terrorism Occasional Paper Number 13, Richard E. Killblane, Combat Studies Institute, 2005
- Convoy Ambush Case Studies, MilitaryBookshop.com.UK, 2010
- War Paint; The Filthy Thirteen Jump Into Normandy, Richard E. Killblane and Brian Miller, Victory Press, 2013
- Convoy Ambush Case Studies Vol. I, Korea and Vietnam, Richard E. Killblane, US Army Transportation School, 2014
- Convoy Ambush Case Studies Vol. II, Iraq and Afghanistan Richard E. Killblane, US Army Transportation School, 2015
- Lam Son 719; The Cargo Must Get Through, Richard E. Killblane, US Army Transportation School, 2017
- Delivering Victory; The History of U.S. Military Transportation, Richard E. Killblane, Emerald Publishing Limited, 2019.
- They Were the Rough Riders; Inside Theodore Roosevelt's Famed Cavalry Regiment, Richard E. Killblane, McFarland, 2022
