= Timber Hawkeye =

U.S. based Israeli author (born 1977)

Timber Hawkeye (born Tomer Gal; July 19, 1977), is an Israeli-born American author, best known for writing Buddhist Boot Camp and his self-published memoir, Faithfully Religionless.

== Biography ==
Hawkeye, born Tomer Gal in Bat Yam, was raised in Katzrin, a town in the Golan Heights of Israel. He moved with his parents and older sister to San Francisco at the age of 13.

Hawkeye held various jobs during his teenage years and early twenties. He started as a paperboy at 14, delivering the San Francisco Examiner in the Sunset District. During his senior year of high school, he worked for the State Compensation Insurance Fund. He then attended California State University, Stanislaus for college and worked at the California State University, Stanislaus Foundation Department, and as a paralegal in the Bay Area and Seattle, Washington, focusing mainly on commercial real estate. Hawkeye stated that he found living in Seattle more rewarding than living in California, despite earning less money.

After living in Seattle, Hawkeye sold his belongings and moved to Honolulu, Hawaii, intending to lead a simpler life. He worked odd jobs on the island to cover expenses and spent his time engaging in leisure activities and studying.

In 2013, Hawkeye published his first book, Buddhist Boot Camp., a collection of emails he sent to his friends from Hawaii over approximately eight years. It was initially self-published and later published by HarperCollins.

After touring for Buddhist Boot Camp, Hawkeye moved to the Eastern Sierras to write and publish his second book. In early 2016, he founded a publishing company, Hawkeye Publishers, to publish his and others' work.

Faithfully Religion less is a self-published memoir aimed at audiences who consider themselves spiritual but not religious. It was launched at Grace Cathedral in San Francisco, and the book tour included appearances at several churches across the U.S.

The Opposite of Namaste was self-published on August 8, 2022, and contains 84 transcripts of Hawkeye's podcast.
