= E. M. Nathanson =

American novelist (1928–2016)

Erwin Nathanson
- Born: Erwin Nathanson; February 17, 1928; New York City, U.S.
- Died: April 5, 2016 (aged 88); Laguna Niguel, California, U.S.
- Occupation: Author
- Notable work: The Dirty Dozen

Erwin Nathanson (February 17, 1928 – April 5, 2016) was an American author who wrote the novel The Dirty Dozen (1965), which was adapted into the 1967 film of the same name.

== Background ==
Nathanson was born in 1928 in The Bronx. His mother was institutionalized for depression when he was two years old, so he lived in a Jewish orphanage in Manhattan until he was seven, when he was sent to the Hebrew National Orphan Home in Yonkers. He left after graduating high school.

Nathanson majored in anthropology at New York University. He held a variety of writing and editing jobs, including copy editor for Fairchild Publications in New York, reporter for The Arlington Sun in Virginia, stringer for The Washington Post and freelance magazine writer.

By 1959, Nathanson lived in Los Angeles, editing a chain of pulp magazines including Daring Detective.

== The Dirty Dozen ==
In 1965, Nathanson wrote the war novel The Dirty Dozen, a story about twelve servicemen convicted of robbery, murder and rape, sent on a suicide mission to blow up a chateau of German generals just before D-Day with the promise of commuted sentences to those who survive.

The novel was inspired by a B movie directed by Roger Corman, The Secret Invasion, and a true story of World War II American criminal paratroopers nicknamed "The Dirty Dozen" (or "Filthy Thirteen" for their refusal to bathe), said to have gone on a similar mission. Nathanson heard the story from his producer friend Russ Meyer, who said he heard it while a World War II combat photographer.

Nathanson researched in vain for two years to verify the story's accuracy before receiving a contract for the fictionalized novel, which sold over two million copies in ten languages.

== Death ==
Nathanson died of heart failure on April 5, 2016, at his Laguna Niguel, California home. He was 88, survived by his partner Elizabeth Henderson and son Michael from his marriage to Marianne Nathanson.

== Bibliography ==
- The Dirty Dozen (1965) ISBN 978-0970466204
- The Latecomers (1970)
- It Gave Everybody Something To Do (with Louise Thoresen) (1973)
- A Dirty Distant War (1987)- The Sequel to The Dirty Dozen
- Knight's Cross (with Aaron Bank) (1993)
- Lovers and Schemers (2003)
