= 29th Ranger Battalion (United States) =

WW2 United States Army unit

The 29th Provisional Ranger Battalion was a United States Army unit in World War II. Formed in December 1942 in England as a detachment of volunteers from the 29th Infantry Division, the battalion underwent commando training under British supervision and participated in raids on German installations, mostly in concert with No. 4 Commando. The battalion was disbanded in October 1943 and its men returned to their parent units.

== Formation ==
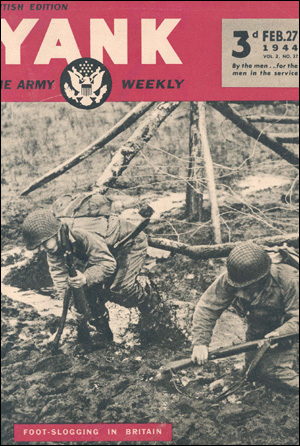
Two members of the 29th Ranger Battalion demonstrating their fitness for photographers at the training center in Scotland. By the time this image was published on Yank the battalion had been disbanded and the men returned to their parent organizations.

On Monday, 4 February 1943, ten officers and 166 enlisted men and NCOs of the 29th Infantry Division were sent to Achnacarry, Scotland. The British Commando instructors called this unit, which was undergoing Ranger training, the 2nd Ranger Battalion. However, another American unit also had that designation, so the Rangers in the battalion and the American staff officers called them the 29th Ranger Battalion, named after its division. Major Randy Millholland of the 115th Infantry Regiment, the battalion commanding officer, instructed his men to "keep their eyes and ears open and their mouths shut." Millholland, a tough, energetic officer, was widely respected. The Ranger trainees were immensely proud of their battalion and did not want to be sent back to their old units as instructors in Ranger tactics. Soon after the proud Rangers completed their training, two of them accompanied a raiding force of British Commandos during an attack on one of the Channel Islands. One of these Rangers covered the withdrawal of his group, killing three German soldiers and wounded several others. By the time of this raid, the 29th Battalion had grown to include four Ranger infantry companies and one headquarters company.

The following is from an article entitled, "29th RANGER BATTALION (Dec. 1942 – Nov. 1943)" by J. Robert Slaughter which appeared in the Twenty-Niner Newsletter in July 1993. Mr. Slaughter was a member of the Provisional Rangers. More information can be found regarding the 29th Provisional Rangers and the illustrious history of Maryland's 29th division at the Maryland Museum of Military History at the Fifth Regiment Armory in Baltimore.

Many 29ers aren't aware that almost 500 volunteers from the 115th, 116th and 175th Infantry regiments were recruited into an elite hit-and-run strike force whose mission would be to gather enemy intelligence. commit disruptive sabotage or simply to raid-in-force enemy installations. This unit was called the 29th Provisional Ranger Battalion.

There were a few men recruited from other than infantry regiments of the Division. I am aware of a young American who joined the Canadian Army in 1939 and transferred to the 29th Rangers. Lt. Ed McNabb was stationed in England and on the staff of Eighth Air Support Command when he heard of the formation. He, like many of us eagerly signed up.

In December 1942, a memo was sent to troops stationed in England, most of whom were from the 29th Infantry Division, asking for volunteers for a Provisional Ranger Battalion. Recruits weren't hard to find. Over 1,000 men readily volunteered, then had to pass rigid physical and mental examinations. That was the easy part.

After a few weeks of training at Tidworth, the candidates were sent north to Scotland for what many have said was the toughest training they ever went through. Taking the course during wintertime didn't make life any easier. The austere Commando Depot at Achnacarry House, Spean Bridge, was located in the highlands and near beautiful Loch Lochy.

Nearby green heather grew on craggy, low mountains which created a mushy, water-logged moor. Ubiquitous mountain streams tumbled downhill toward nearby deep, blue lochs. Herds of deer, sheep, and wild ponies roamed in relative peace in this wilderness. It rained often and a biting wind was constant. One has to admit the scenery was beautiful to the eye but unpleasant to the skin. Our instructors were from Lord Lovatt's No, 4 Commando Unit and many of them were veterans of the infamous Dieppe Raid. These officers and non-commissioned officers were from the old school—very strict disciplinarians. Within a short time, half the Ranger candidates had thrown in the towel and were sent back to their original outfits. Those finishing would become proud members of the "29th Provisional Rangers."

What was the Commando concept and what had we volunteered to do? The idea of a quick-hitting, lightly armed shock force was initiated by the British in 1940. The cornerstone of the Commando concept's success was their strict standards of selection and the intensity of training. Some indication of what qualities were sought in volunteers was given in a circular sent by MO9 to the British infantry regiments in June 1940: ".. Able to swim, immune from sea and air sickness, able to drive motor vehicles, with courage, physical endurance, initiative and resourceful, being active, expert marksmen, self-reliance, and an aggressive spirit toward the war.. .and must become expert in military use of scouting...to stalk...to report everything taking place day or night, silently and unseen ...and to live off the country for considerable periods. Some of the Ranger candidates were asked, 'have you ever killed a man?' And could you 'stick a knife in a man... and twist it?'"Chief of Staff General George C. Marshall and British Combined Operations Chief Lord Louis Mountbatten first discussed the possibility of raising an American Commando-type unit. Lord Mountbatten suggested calling the force "Rangers."

A special shock-troop concept was fashioned after German "Stosstruppen" of World War I. Their elitism, discipline and fighting qualities were well known to senior British officers. They had also studied the French and Indian War of the 1750a A force of 900 French-Canadian woodsmen and Indians defeated a hand-picked expeditionary force of 1,400 British and American regulars. The woodsmen using Indian tactics—stealth and taking advantage of cover—out-flanked the superior force. The defeat turned into a rout.

The first battalion of Rangers was recruited after General Lucian K. Truscott, CG, of the 3rd Infantry Division, reported to the Joint Chiefs of Staff on 26 May 1942, that there should be an American force recruited along Commando lines. President Roosevelt had already given his support. A battalion of Rangers was raised from the 1st Infantry Division who were then stationed in Northern Ireland.

One thousand volunteers were sent to Scotland for training. Five hundred survived and became Rangers. This unit pre-ceded the 29th Rangers at Achnacarry Commando Depot, and a select few went on the August 1942 Dieppe Raid with Nos. 3 and 4 Commando. They also spearheaded the invasions of North Africa, Sicily and Italy.

Soon after the 1st Rangers left the Depot, the eager 29th Ranger candidates arrived. We were quickly introduced to British Army discipline and basic infantry training—the Commando way. We also quickly realized how well the American soldier was treated. Basic Commando training consisted of getting into top physical shape by speed marching 7–15 miles; running the toughest obstacle course in the world; mountain and cliff climbing; abseiling down cliffs and buildings; unarmed combat; plus stripped-to-the-waist physical exercises using 10-foot logs to throw around. In addition to this we had to be proficient firing our weapons; finding one's way on those desolate moors with nothing but a map and compass, and to find and cook food (living off the land). We learned to employ and defuse explosives including plastics.

The obstacle course's path was a five-mile climb up a steady grade. It had every diabolic obstacle the British could devise: negotiating 10-foot walls, log and rope bridges traversing steep ravines plus rope swings over water hazards. There was little chance of escaping the mud and water hazards. Cadre acting as umpires, graded the contestants' performances. Life-sized targets popped up requiring snap judgment. One must quickly decide whether to shoot (live ammunition) the pop-up targets or bayonet them. A miss or wrong decision could be judged fatal. Running over the muddy course caused many weapons to misfire. The entire team was required to finish on time. If an umpired judged a squad member neutralized, he had to be carried. Time was taken after the last member crossed the line. If he failed to meet the deadline, the entire team had to run the "black mile." The "black mile" was running the course on our day off—Sunday.

Nearby Ben Nevis, the highest British mountain at 4,406 feet, was a favorite climb. We once climbed two gut-wrenching mountains in one day. Some slopes were so steep one had to worry about sliding off backwards. Our instructors prodded us along and didn't allow pauses. He cautioned that once you stop, you won't be able to restart. Mountain climbing is like crossing a desert and imagining mirages. The next step poses great difficulty but the crest seems mercifully in sight. As one finally nears what appears the elusive top, another "false crest" appears, and then another and another.

This was tough duty. Our Commando instructor, Captain Hoar, a veteran of the Dieppe Raid, was a career soldier. British officers, prim and proper, carried a foot-long leather baton called a "swagger stick." It had a purpose. During a tough speed march, one of our men, unable to continue, dropped out along the road. Captain Hoar ordered the man to his feet. The soldier pleaded his inability to continue. That stick went into action around the shoulders of the "yellow-bellied-coward-that-wasn't-fit-to-breathe-fresh-air!" We also observed him rib-kicking a slacker who couldn't take one of the rigorous exercises. Both were sent packing—in disgrace.

Speed marches were a British Commando specialty that propelled the troops into quick-hitting strikes that were designed to surprise the enemy. Stealth was another tactic that made up for the heavy firepower that ordinary infantry troops employ. The terrain around Fort William was hilly. We quick-stepped uphill and double-timed down the other side.

The prescribed time for short hikes was 7 mph; longer ones, 5 mph. We traveled light—rifle, carbine, BAR, 60mm mortar, cartridge belt and light pack.

Near the conclusion of these debilitating speed-marches and just before rounding the curve up the last hill to camp, Captain Hoar would yell in his curt British brogue, "Straighten up, mytees! [mates!'] Get in step!" Camp was still a mile away, and the wail of bagpipes could be heard in the distance. The kilted pipers, standing at the entrance to camp, greeted us with one of the traditional Highland tunes. This did wonders for morale. No matter how tired we were, the sound of bagpipe music sent adrenalin flowing. With tremendous pride, we marched into camp in step and with heads held high.

Our graduation reward was a pair of "paratrooper" boots and a 3-inch felt patch sewn on an Eisenhower jacket. The patch was rainbow-shaped with red background and blue lettering, "29th RANGERS." These were visual displays of elitism and were worn with great pride and, I must say, a bit of cockiness, The 29th Rangers didn't think there was an obstacle they couldn't hurdle and were eager to prove themselves.

My chance came on my first 8-day pass to London. I was lounging in Rainbow Corner, the Red Cross retreat for American servicemen and women. A GI airborne corporal, who stood about 5'8" and weighed about 160 pounds, swaggered over. I was also a corporal at the time and about 6'5", weighing about 205 pounds. The cocky paratrooper looked up at me and asked in a threatening voice, "Mack, you in the 'troopers?' " I answered in the negative. I thought to myself, hell man, I'm in the 29th Rangers! He then said with authority, "Take those Goddamned boots oft!" Surprised. I wondered if he wasn't juiced even though he had a few buddies and I was alone. He wasn't drunk, he was a PARATROOPER! I answered with fire in my eyes, "why don't YOU take them off me!" He bristled menacingly and began to swing wildly. I easily stiff-armed and parried his blows, as his buddies subdued the modern-day "David."

PICTURESQUE BUDE, CORNWALL : The 29th Rangers' first home base was Bude, a beautiful seacoast village in Cornwall. Pre-war, Bude was a "holidays" resort, famous for its nice weather, beautiful beach and golf course. Our quarters were in one of the swanky ocean-side hotels. My roommate was a Marylander from the 115th whom everyone called "Smitty." Smith, I can't remember his first name]. The training was rough but living conditions and food were excellent. The weather was nice and swimming in the ocean became part of our training. Everyone sported a golden tan.

The Battalion was called on to test a variety of Army food rations. An Army fights on its stomach so it's important the meals be compact, filling, tasty and nourishing. Each company tested a particular ration with each man weighing daily and answering questionnaires. Company A tested C-rations; Company B [my company], K-rations; C Company, 10-in-1s; D Company, a combination of 10-in-1s and chocolate D-bars.

Ten days of grueling speed marches, averaging 25 miles a day, were designed to prove which ration was best and also to separate the men from the boys. We swore that no supplemental food would be eaten during this test. The first day was destined to be the worst—a 37mile speed march, quick-stepping 5 mph, with a five-minute break on the hour and 20 minutes for lunch. I broke in a new pair of boots during this ordeal. Blisters began to form 10 miles out. About halfway, the boots had rubbed my feet and ankles raw. My socks were not only sweaty but blood-soaked.

That night we tried to pitch tents on the wind-swept, soggy moors. The first thing I did was tend to my bloody feet which were a mess. I couldn't get the tent pegs to hold, so I sat on a folded shelter-half to keep my bottom dry and wrapped a blanket around my tired, aching body. No matter how I sat my legs began to cramp. I spent a miserable night. I had to be ready the next day or be disgraced. I persevered. My weight dropped from 205 to 170 pounds in those 10 days. At the conclusion of the exercise, the battalion returned to Rude looking like survivors of the Bataan death march. Bedraggled and very hungry, we limped over the last hill into town. We showered and changed into clean, dry clothes and headed for the mess hall for breakfast. It was an all you-can-eat feast of powdered eggs, bacon, sausage, pancakes, syrup, jelly, bread and coffee. I piled my mess kit high and found a quiet place to eat. After a few bites I was full. Stomachs had shrunk. After a few days, we gained most of our weight back. They gave us the rest of the day to rest and clean equipment.

The rest break didn't last long. The very next day it was back at the grindstone. A daily dose of indoctrination on how tough we had become caused many of us to believe it. Our officers were young, smart, tough and aggressive. They seemed eager to go to war. If one couldn't measure up, he was sent back. Soon the 29th Rangers looked like an elite unit was supposed to—lean and hard. After a few months at Bude we moved to Eastleigh, near Dartmouth in Hampshire. My billet-mate was John Kennelly, an Irish-Catholic from Waterbury, Conn. The British used the billet system to room and board detachments into private homes. Our landlady was a sixtyish widow named Mrs. Brand. For a short while Mrs. Brand became our mother away from home. She shared her meager food rations, depriving herself of the few "luxury" items such as eggs, butter, cheese and sugar. When time came to say good-by, we knew and she knew it would be the last time we would see each other. She knew the consequence of war better than we. I often wonder what became of that wonderful lady.

DOVER: The channel port of Dover was our next move. Twenty-two miles across the Strait of Dover was the enemy-held French port of Calais. Each side deployed huge artillery pieces which were sheltered in limestone caves and rolled out on railway tracks to firing positions. These cross-channel duels disrupted lives of the citizens and their commerce. Non-essential civilians and all children were evacuated. After the first shell exploded, air-raid sirens sounded and wardens herded people to shelters. Market Square, a favorite target in the center of town, was an uninhabited pile of rubble.

Servicemen occasionally were invited to dances at the Armory. Women from the British military, ATS, WAAFS and WRENS, also were invited. This night the Royal Air Force Band was playing Glenn Miller and Tommy Dorsey-type music and everyone was having a grand lime until the loudest explosion I had ever heard. The ground shook. The music didn't stop and everyone kept dancing. Sirens screamed but no one paid attention. Finally, helmeted whistle-blowing wardens rushed in and ushered everyone to safety. It was very orderly.

Wartime Britain's philosophy was to live each day to the fullest. Make no future plans. Make each moment count. Postpone nothing if it can be done right now. They lived each day as if it would be the last on earth. Eat, drink and be merry because tomorrow might not come. In 1943 Britain was either partying or stoically working. No one complained.

Dover was definitely a war zone. Not only did it experience cross-channel artillery duels but German bombers flew over almost nightly on their way to London and other cities. Anti-aircraft batteries were stationed throughout the countryside and on top of downtown buildings. What goes up must come back down. While on nightly training exercises flak rained down from anti-aircraft guns, bouncing off the ground like white-hot hail. Occasionally, Jerry dropped unspent bombs on Dover and the nearby countryside upon his return to der Fatherland.

Kennelly and I were billeted near downtown. One night after the Lancasters raided the continent, one of them mortally wounded, could not climb above one of the tethered barrage balloons. The roar of the cripple's engines sounded as if it was going to hit our house. The bomber snagged the balloon cable and crashed less than a block away, setting off explosions. Could actual combat be more hazardous?

Our mission in Dover was reportedly to prepare for a Dieppe-type raid-in-force. Multi-national assault units were assembled near Dover for this special secret mission. Canadian infantrymen, British and French Commandos, Royal Marine Commandos and American Rangers rehearsed day and night while waiting for the "dark-of-the-moon." We were at last going to be tested.

Without warning, an announcement was made that the 29th Rangers were to disband and rejoin their original units who were training for the invasion. Many hearts were saddened that these magnificently-trained, handpicked men with their mission unfulfilled would be scattered to the four winds. Why was this mission aborted and why were the Rangers disbanded? We were told the 2nd and 5th Rangers had been training in Florida and would replace the 29th Rangers. Allow me to speculate. Just prior to D-Day, High Command created a bogus army which was to fool the Germans into thinking the main invasion effort would be directed across the channel in the Calais area. This ploy was to divert many divisions from Normandy. Could we have been part of that bogus army?

To answer the big question, did the 29th Rangers take part in three raids into occupied Norway and France as has been reported? Answer: I was in the Rangers from beginning to end and I never heard a former member who said he participated in a live raid. I can assure one and all, the Battalion did not participate as a unit on a live exercise. Ed McNabb, a former A Company officer, now living in San Antonio, said he was told Lt. John Dance and possibly Sergeant Toda might have. 29 Let's Go! reported the Battalion made three raids and that Lt. Col. Milholland had left his helmet on the beach. It is entirely possible individuals were selected to accompany No. 3 or 4 Commando as observers. This takes not a whit from the fact, this unit would have been outstanding in combat. It is a shame they were never used.

The 29th Rangers were in existence 11 months—December 1942 to November 1943. During that short time the Battalion left a legacy of what Ranger means. Even though they saw no combat as a unit, they were a proud and disciplined group. Much of the credit must go to the British Commando instructors, our Battalion Commander, Lt. Col. Randolph Millholland and Battalion Executive Officer, Major Lloyd Marr. Both had fine combat records with the 115th Infantry Regiment.

I have often wondered if the 29th Ranger Battalion could have accomplished the daunting D-Day task of scaling the cliffs at Pointe du Hoc and then neutralize its gun batteries. Did we have the necessary training, leadership, luck, courage and skill to do what the 2nd Battalion Rangers did? No one will ever know for sure, but I am certain that if a way could be found to accomplish this "mission impossible," we could have.

NOTE on MAJ Randolph Millholland from oral history given to COL (Ret) Michael Lewis, U.S. Army, circa 1979–1980.

I was fortunate to grow up a few houses up the street from BG (ret) Randy Millholland. When I was in high school and applying for admittance to West Point, BG Millholland told me stories of his exploits during WW2. According to Millholland, he served on the Montgomery's General Staff following his completion of the British General Headquarters Battle School. At that time, he and William Darby were ordered to attend the British Commando School at Achnacarry. Both of the Americans were in their 30s at the time and Millholland remarked that the class was entirely made up of 18-year British kids, and keeping up with them was the most difficult thing he had ever done, yet they finished the course. Upon graduation, the British unit (possibly the Royal Marines) leadership handed the two Americans the unit's green beret; they looked at each other and said why not, they'd earned it and they donned the green berets (arguably the first two Americans to wear the distinctive special operations Green Beret). Bill Darby, of course, went on to start the 1st Ranger Battalion and when they deployed to North Africa, MAJ Millholland was instructed to recruit his 29th Infantry Division soldiers to lead through the Commando School and form the 29th Ranger Battalion as detailed previously. The 29th Rangers were attached to Lord Lovat's No. 4 Commando and Millholland personally participated in three raids with the British Commando Unit on the coast of Norway. In the fall of 1943, Millholland led a raid to Normandy at Ile d'Oussant, an island off the coast of France destroying a German radar post and leaving his rifle symbolically stabbed into the ground with his helmet liner on top to send the message that the Americans had been there and would return. He was reported the next day in the news by Axis Sally as killed in action, the first of several times of such a report (he was wounded in action in France leading the 3rd Battalion, 115th Infantry, 29th Division).

== Ends service ==
After the two Rangers accompanied the Commandos, an entire company of the 29th was scheduled to raid the French coast. However, on 18 October 1943, a notice was posted stating that the 29th Ranger Infantry Battalion would cease to exist. All of the battalion's Rangers were enraged. Some of them turned their fury on their huts, shooting them up. The soldiers of the 29th were returned to their original units.

== Later Unit ==
During the 1970s a single unit, Company B, 1st Battalion, 29th Infantry Regiment, was stationed at Kelly Hill at Fort Benning, Georgia. The company, on jump status, provided aggressor support for the United States Army's Ranger Department at all three Ranger Training camps (Darby, Dalonega and Camp Rudder in Florida). The unit's personnel originally wore the distinctive ranger black beret (this prior to the entire Army being given black berets). Those who graduated from Ranger School were authorized to sew a Ranger dress tab above the 1-29th Infantry teal blue "flash" with unit crest on the beret.

The company was integrated into the Ranger Department in the early 1980s. A story on the unit titled "Ranger Killers" appeared in an issue of "Gung Ho" magazine written by former Company B ranger Greg Walker. The company was the last such Ranger unit outside of the Ranger Department and the then-existing two Ranger battalions (1st and 2d, 75th Infantry) in the United States Army.

Note: Other than sharing the same number, the 29th Provisional Ranger Battalion of World War II and Company B, 1st Battalion, 29th Infantry, have no lineage or historical connection and were two entirely unrelated units. The unit from the Second World War was numbered for its parent National Guard 29th Infantry Division while the Regular Army 29th Infantry Regiment served as a separate, non-divisional unit in the European Theater of Operations. For much of its existence, the latter unit has served in a training role at Fort Benning, GA.

== See also ==
- 1st Battalion, 75th Ranger Regiment
- 2d Battalion, 75th Ranger Regiment
- 75th Ranger Regiment
