= Hawkeye Transfer Company Warehouse =

- U.S. National Register of Historic Places
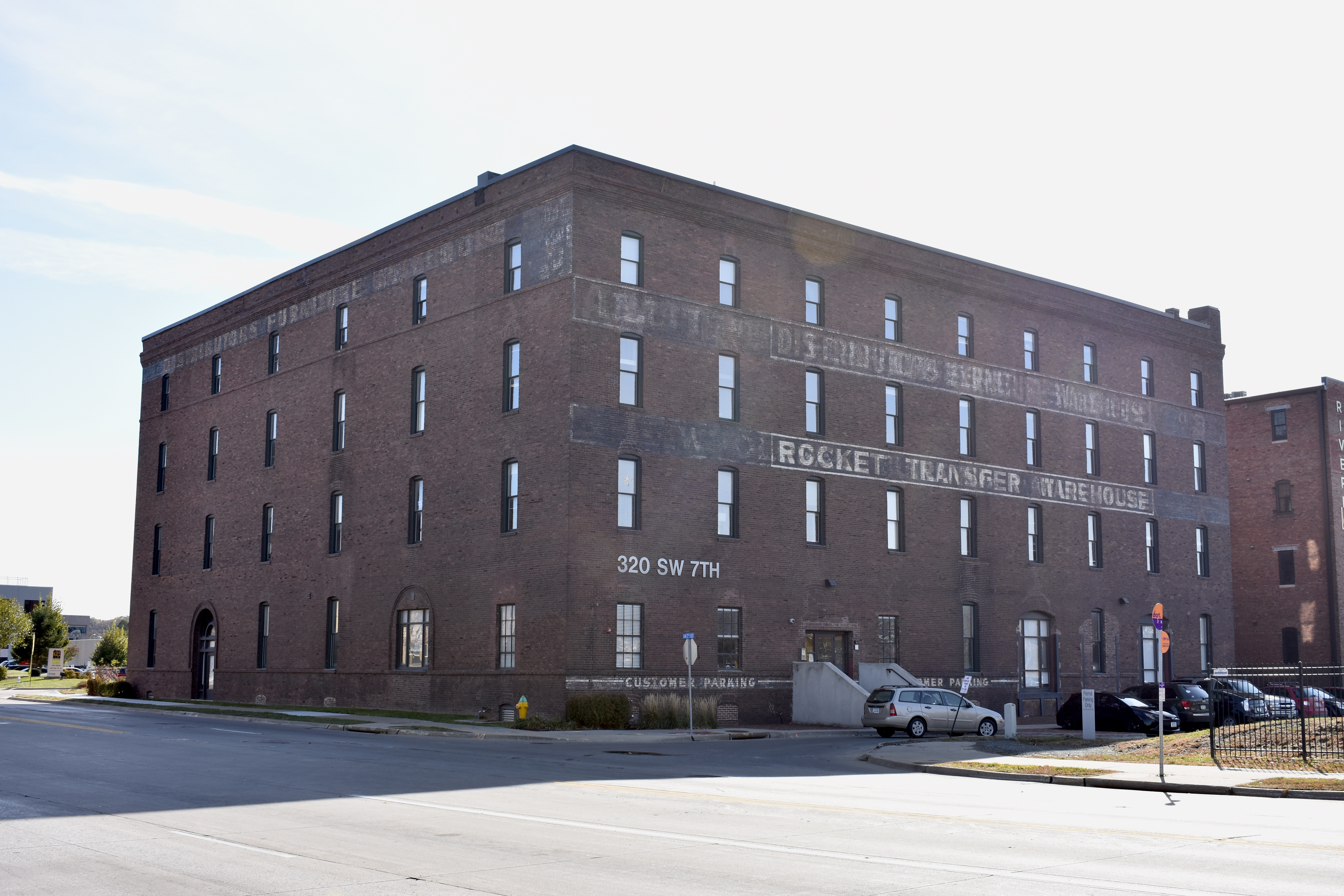

- Location within Iowa Location within the United States
- Location: 702 Elm St. Des Moines, Iowa
- Coordinates: 41°34′50″N 93°37′28″W
- Area: less than one acre
- Built: 1901
- NRHP reference No.: 10000077
- Added to NRHP: March 22, 2010

The Hawkeye Transfer Company Warehouse, also known as the Rocket Transfer Building, is a historic building located in downtown Des Moines, Iowa, United States. The building was built by Frederick Hubbell who founded F.M. Hubbell and Son, which became Hubbell Realty Co. The company has retained ownership of the building since it was built. Plans were approved in 2009 to convert the building, as well as the Schmitt and Henry Manufacturing Company complex, into loft apartments. It was listed on the National Register of Historic Places in 2010.
