= Hawkeye Collins and Amy Adams =

- Book #2 of the series
- Author: M. Masters
- Language: English
- Genre: Children's literature
- Media type: Print (Paperback)

Christopher "Hawkeye" Collins and Amy (Amanda) Adams are a pair of 12-year-old fictional detectives, the main characters in a series of children's novels titled Can You Solve The Mystery?, credited to M. Masters (a pseudonym used by different writers), originally published from 1983–1985, by Meadowbrook Press. The series was republished in 1992, 2006-2007 by Spotlight (ABDO Publishing Company) and most recently in 2013 by Meadowbrook Press as Can You Solve The Mystery?.

== Style ==
Similar in style to Encyclopedia Brown, readers are given clues in the form of narration. An important distinction from the Encyclopedia Brown series is the graphical picture included for each story, presented as a sketch by "Hawkeye" Collins of the scene of the crime, which provide the necessary hint to solve the puzzle.

Collins and Adams are neighbours who live across from each other on Crestview Drive in the fictional town of Lakewood Hills, Minnesota. Collins is described as having excellent observation prowess and able to carry out a quick but comprehensive sketch of the scene of the crime which capture vital clues to solving the mystery. Adams is an athletic red-haired girl who is described as "quick of mind, quick of feet and quick of temper".

It was mentioned that Hawkeye's father is a lawyer and his mother a real-estate agent. Amy's father is an airline pilot and her mother a medical doctor.

Together, they were often called upon to solve crimes or mysteries in their town.

== Book structure ==
As an introduction to the main characters, after the content page of all books in the series, readers will find a double-page impression of a fictional newspaper Lakewood Hills Herald cutouts with two photos of Hawkeye and Amy, and beneath them the headline "Young Sleuths Detect Fun in Mysteries", by staff writer named Alice Cory. The articles were shown to be from page 2A and 4A of the publication, dated Thursday, March 17, 1983.

The article narrated the backgrounds of Hawkeye and Amy, specifying they were 12 years old attending sixth grade in Lakewood Hills Elementary. Hawkeye's father was named as attorney Peter Collins, and his mother real-estate agent Linda Collins.

The story went on to report Hawkeye and Amy started in the detective business the year before, solving a crime in their own school, and impressing police sergeant Treadwell.

The next page showed a letter from Hawkeye and Amy inviting readers to solve the mysteries in the book by reading carefully, and then to look closely at the picture provided.

The solutions to the mysteries are found at the end of the book, printed in mirror image.

While most of the books in the series are self-contained and composed of mini-mysteries, several of the books contained different portions of the same case. In the first book, the last mystery was part 1 of a 2 part mystery, with the solution, and part 2 of the Mystery, published in the second book.

== Recurring characters ==
Recurring characters in the books include:

- Mrs. von Buttermore - The richest person in Lakewood Hills who come into contact with the detective pair either because of crimes involving her wealth, or her hobby of donating to charitable causes in town, including sponsoring children's activities.
- Lucy Adams - Amy's six-year-old sister who has a love-hate relationship with Amy.
- Sergeant Treadwell - Veteran of Lakewood Hills Police Department, he is described as a good police officer but poor detective. He is also fond of snacking, despite being told to go on a diet several times by his doctor, Amy's mother.
- Mrs. Ratchet - a grumpy woman who hated any form of intrusion to her residence. Unfortunately, her house is across the park and has been the deliberate or unwitting target of numerous trespasses, and the cause of a number of puzzles for Hawkeye and Amy.
- Nosey - Hawkeye's female Golden Retriever.

== Places/Organizations ==
- Bytes of Data Computer Club - The computer club of Lakewood Hills Elementary, which both Hawkeye and Amy were members of.

== Books in the series ==
Can you solve the mystery? : Hawkeye Collins & Amy Adams in ...
| No. | Title | Cases | Year published | ISBN |
|---|---|---|---|---|
| 01 | The Secret of the Long-Lost Cousin & other mysteries | 1. The Secret of the Long-Lost Cousin; 2. The Case of the Disappearing Diamonds; 3. The Mystery of the Helpful Professor; 4. The Case of the Daisy Dispute; 5. The Case of the Bouncing Check; 6. The Mystery of the Hardware Heist; 7. The Case of Lucy's Lost Lemonade; 8. The Mystery of the Missing Money; 9. The Case of the Bashed Boss; 10. The Secret of the Ancient Treasure. Part 1: The Black Cave; All stories written by Alexander von Wacker | 1983 | ISBN 0-915658-81-X |
| 02 | The Case of the Chocolate Snatcher & other mysteries | 1. The Case of the Crashing Candelabrum; 2. The Case of the Chocolate Snatcher; 3. The Mystery of Lucy's Revenge; 4. The Secret of the Almost Accident; 5. The Case of Double Trouble; 6. The Mystery of the Crook Convention; 7. The Mystery of the Disk Swiper; 8. The Case of the Stolen Samovar; 9. The Secret of the Ancient Treasure. Part 2: The Secret Room; All stories written by Alexander von Wacker | 1983 | ISBN 0-915658-85-2 |
| 03 | The Case of the Video Game Smugglers & other mysteries | 1. The Case of the Computer Camp Kidnap; 2. The Secret of the Tomato Pincher; 3. The Mystery of the Unknown Rescuer; 4. The Case of the Video Game Smugglers; 5. The Mystery at Mill Creek Bridge; 6. The Secret of the Author's Autograph; 7. The Mystery of the Rainy Night Robbery; 8. The Mystery of Amy's Disappearance; 9. The Case of the Sloppy Vandals; 10. The Secret of the Ancient Treasure. Part 3: The Mysterious Message; All stories written by Alexander von Wacker | 1983 | ISBN 0-915658-88-7 |
| 04 | The case of the Mysterious Dognapper & other mysteries | 1. The Case of the Imperfect Crime; 2. The Case of the Mysterious Dognapper; 3. The Mystery of the Moody Medallion *; 4. The Case of the Stashed Cash *; 5. The Mystery of the Double-Crossed Inheritance **; 6. The Secret in the Stands; 7. The Case of the Reptile Rip-Off; 8. The Mystery of the Musical Phone Call; 9. The Secret of the Smuggler's Car; 10. The Secret of the Ancient Treasure. Part 4: The Treasure Trove; All stories written by Alexander von Wacker except: * written by Nancy Crochiere ** written by Rosalyn Stendahl | 1983 | ISBN 0-915658-95-X |
| 05 | The Case of the Clever Computer Crooks & 8 other mysteries | 1. The Case of the Clever Computer Crooks; 2. The Secret of the Emerald Brooch *; 3. The Case of the New Wave Rip-Off; 4. The Mystery of the Michelangelo Maneuver; 5. The Case of the Rock Candy Caper; 6. The Secret of the Concert Hall Pirate; 7. The Case of the Bogus Bigfoot; 8. The Mystery of the Money Box Bandit; 9. The Case of the Vanishing Prince. Part 1: The Haunted Kingdom; All stories written by Lani and David Havens except * by Andrew Kantar | 1983 | ISBN 0-915658-11-9 |
| 06 | The Case of the Famous Chocolate Chip Cookies & 8 other mysteries | 1. The Case of the Grand Canyon rescue 2. The Mystery of the Lily Switcher; 3. The Secret of the Carnival Cowboy; 4. The Case of the Purse Snatcher's Snafu; 5. The Mystery of the Treehouse Troublemaker; 6. The Case of Lucy's Loss; 7. The Secret of the Band-Room Bandit; 8. The Case of the Famous Chocolate Chip Cookies; 9. The Case of the Vanishing Prince. Part 2: The Catwalk Chase; All stories written by Lani and David Havens | 1983 | ISBN 0-915658-15-1 |
| 07 | The Mystery of the Star Ship Movie & 8 other mysteries | 1. The Secret of the Four-Fingered Forger; 2. The Case of the Telltale Water; 3. The Mystery of the Christmas Caper; 4. The Case of the Double Alibi; 5. The Case of the Crashing Frisbee; 6. The Case of Macho's Mistake; 7. The Mystery of the Star Ship Movie; 8. The Secret of the Drug Smuggler; 9. The Case of the Vanishing Prince. Part 3: The Looking Glass Maze; All stories written by Alexander von Wacker | 1983 | ISBN 0-915658-20-8 |
| 08 | The Secret of the Software Spy & 8 other mysteries | 1. The Mystery of the Missing Turkey; 2. The Case of the Tinsel-Teeth Teaser; 3. The Case of the China Catastrophe; 4. The Secret of the Mysterious Letters; 5. The Mystery of Molly's Phone Call; 6. The Mystery of Lucy's Disappearance; 7. The Secret of the Software Spy; 8. The Case of the Book Lover's Treasure Hunt; 9. The Case of the Vanishing Prince. Part 4: The deserted house; All stories written by Alexander von Wacker | 1983 | ISBN 0-915658-26-7 |
| 09 | The Case of the Toilet Paper Decorator & other mysteries | 1. The Case of the Missing Guests; 2. The Case of the Fisherman's Favorite; 3. The Case of the Toilet Paper Decorator; 4. The Mystery of the Furry Lifesaver; 5. The Case of the Suspicious Soybeans; 6. The Case of the Kidnapped Brain; 7. The Case of the Amusement Park Punks; 8. The Secret of Sarge's Padded Cell; Stories by Paul Bagdon | 1984 | ISBN 0-88166-024-8 |
| 10 | The Secret of the Loon Lake Monster & other mysteries | 1. The Case of the Bragging Boyfriend; 2. The Case of the Splattered Sheets; 3. The Mystery of the Telltale Timepiece; 4. The Case of the Computer Cutup; 5. The Secret of the Loon Lake Monster *; 6. The Case of the Nabbed Necklace; 7. The Secret of the Concealed Cash; 8. The Mystery of the Midnight Trickster; 9. The Case of the Camera Snatcher; All stories by Deborah Felder except * by Jean Nugent and Katy Brown | 1984 | ISBN 0-88166-050-7 |
| 11 | The Mystery of the Haunted House & other mysteries | 1. The Case of the Roman Coin; 2. The Case of the Rich Relative; 3. The Secret of the Mysterious Stranger; 4. The Secret of the Special Spies; 5. The Mystery of the Haunted House *; 6. The Case of the Safari Slipup; 7. The Mystery of the Polite Prowler; 8. The Case of the Talkative Traveler; All stories by Suzanne Lord except * by Deborah Felder | 1984 | ISBN 0-88166-025-6 |
| 12 | The Secret of the Video Game Scores & other mysteries | 1. The Secret of the Fortune-Teller; 2. The Mystery of the Circus Kidnapping; 3. The Case of the Invisible Burglar; 4. The Secret of the Video Game Scores; 5. The Case of the Escaped Convict; 6. The Mystery of the Speedy Snitcher *; 7. The Case of the Convenient Car Crash; 8. The Secret of the Smashed Statue; 9. The Mystery of Hawkeye's Letters; All stories by B. B. Hiller except * by Paul Bagdon | 1984 | ISBN 0-88166-026-4 |
| 13 | The mystery of the phony Frankenstein & other mysteries | | 1985 | ISBN 0-88166-034-5 |
| 14 | The case of the clever marathon cheat & other mysteries | | 1985 | ISBN 0-88166-035-3 |

== Comic strip ==
There was both a daily and Sunday comic strip version of "Can You Solve The Mystery?" that ran in newspapers from August 5, 1984 to December 29, 1985. The comic strip was written initially by Jim Lawrence and drawn by Fran Matera, but others took on later in the run of the series.
