= John C. Sullivan =

American land surveyor (1788–1830)

- Born: December 9, 1788; Kentucky, U.S.
- Died: July 27, 1830 (aged 41); St. Louis, Missouri, U.S.
- Resting place: Bellefontaine Cemetery, St. Louis, Missouri, U.S.

John C. Sullivan (December 9, 1788 – July 27, 1830) was a surveyor who established the Indian Boundary Line and the Sullivan Line which were to form the boundary between Native Americans and white settlers in Indian Territory from Iowa to Texas.

Following the Indian Removal Act in 1830 all Native Americans west of the Mississippi River and many east of the river were moved west of the Indian Boundary Line. In 1838 disputes over the Sullivan Line were to touch off the bloodless Honey War over the boundary between Missouri and Iowa.

== Background ==
In the Treaty of Fort Clark in 1808, the Osage Nation, the most influential tribe in Missouri, ceded all lands west of Fort Clark near Sibley, Missouri in Jackson County, Missouri. In exchange for this, the tribe was paid merchandise worth $1,500 along with a fort to protect them and a government sanctioned trading post.

The specific boundaries:

And in consideration of the advantages which we derive from the stipulations contained in the foregoing articles, we, the chiefs and warriors of the Great and Little Osage, for ourselves and our nations respectively, covenant and agree with the United States, that the boundary line between our nations and the United States shall be as follows, to wit: beginning at Fort Clark, on the Missouri, five miles above Fire Prairie, and running thence a due south course to the river Arkansas, and down the same to the Mississippi; hereby ceding and relinquishing forever to the United States, all the lands which lie east of the said line, and north of the southwardly bank of the said river Arkansas, and all lands situated northwardly of the river Missouri. And we do further cede and relinquish to the United States forever, a tract of two leagues square, to embrace fort Clark, and to be laid off in such manner as the President of the United States shall think proper.

The treaty provided the following provision:

And it is mutually agreed by the contracting parties, that the boundary lines hereby established, shall be run and marked at the expense of the United States, as soon as circumstances or their convenience will permit; and the Great and Little Osage promise to depute two chiefs from each of their respective nations, to accompany the commissioner, or commissioners who may be appointed on the part of the United States, to settle and adjust the said boundary line.

== Indian Boundary Line ==
In 1816 the boundary was "adjusted" 23 miles (37 km) west to the mouth of the Kansas River on the Missouri River which was a more significant geographic boundary than Fire Prairie Creek. Although no treaties were in place acknowledging the new line, the United States began to survey the new boundary line to which all were to be removed.

Sullivan was instructed to run by his boss William Rector, head of the survey agency for Missouri and Illinois territories to draw a line 100 miles (160 km) north from the mouth of the Kansas River and thence east 150 miles (240 km) and 40 chains to the Des Moines River.

Sullivan was to be criticized later for not extending the line all the way to the similarly named but different Des Moines Rapids on the Mississippi River at about the latitude of Fort Madison, Iowa.

Sullivan was to begin his survey on the "far bank" of the confluence on the Left Bank of the Missouri at what is now the Clay County, Missouri and Platte County, Missouri line at what is now property owned by Kansas City Downtown Airport.

The 100-mile (160 km) mark that now forms the Iowa-Missouri border was placed just north of Sheridan, Missouri.

Joseph C. Brown in 1823 survey the boundary south to the Arkansas boundary. From Arkansas it has a small eastward angle to the Arkansas River at Fort Smith, Arkansas where it then heads due south before briefly following the Red River of the South to the Texas border.

The line now forms the border between Missouri and Kansas, Missouri and Oklahoma, and Arkansas and Oklahoma.

== Sullivan Line ==
Sullivan drifted northward by 2 degrees as he headed east to the Des Moines which he described as shallow and calm when he crossed it at just south of Farmington, Iowa.

Sullivan was a delegate to the Missouri Constitutional Convention that defined the state's borders.

The initial proposal for the boundaries of Missouri were close to the boundaries of today and followed the original Osage territory. There was a debate about extending the northern border 80 miles (130 km) further north to the mouth of the Rock River (Illinois) at Rock Island, Illinois and the western boundary 30 miles (48 km) further west to the mouth of the Wolf River (Kansas) at White Cloud, Kansas. The additions would have made Missouri the largest state in the Union and under Congressional pressure it was dropped back to the current configuration since the lines were already marked (plus the addition of the Bootheel to accommodate the wishes of Mississippi River towns to stay with their Missouri compatriots.

The state's official description was:

Beginning in the middle of the Mississippi River, on the parallel of thirty-six degrees of north latitude; thence west along the said parallel of latitude to the St. Francois River; thence up and following the course of that river, in the middle of the main channel thereof, to the parallel of latitude of thirty-six degrees and thirty minutes; thence west along the same to a point where the said parallel is intersected by a meridian line passing through the middle of the mouth of the Kansas River, where the same empties into the Missouri River; thence, from the point aforesaid, north along the said meridian line, to the intersection of the parallel of latitude which passes through the rapids of the River Des Moines, making said line correspond with the Indian boundary-line; thence east from the point of intersection last aforesaid, along the said parallel of latitude, to the middle of the channel of the main fork of the said River Des Moines; thence down along the middle of the main channel of the said River Des Moines to the mouth of the same, where it empties into the Mississippi River; thence due east to the middle of the main channel of the Mississippi River; thence down and following the course of the Mississippi River, in the middle of the main channel thereof, to the place of beginning.

The wording in the Constitution of "north along the said meridian line, to the intersection of the parallel of latitude which passes through the rapids of the River Des Moines, making said line correspond with the Indian boundary-line" was to stir problems later since Sullivan had not crossed any rapids while a set of rapids on the Mississippi River called the Des Moines Rapids defined the northern navigational end of the Mississippi which was 2.4 feet (0.73 m) deep in the rapids.

In 1824, treaties for the Ioway, Sauk and Meskwaki ceding their land in Missouri implied that the Sullivan Line was Missouri's northern border all the way to the Mississippi.

The Ioway Tribe or Nation of Indians by their deputies, Ma-hos-kah, (or White Cloud,) and Mah-ne-hah-nah, (or Great Walker,) in Council assembled, do hereby agree, in consideration of a certain sum of money, &c. to be paid to the said Ioway Tribe, by the government of the United States, as hereinafter stipulated, to cede and forever, quit claim, and do, in behalf of their said Tribe, hereby cede, relinquish, and forever quit claim, unto the United States, all right, title, interest, and claim, to the lands which the said Ioway Tribe have, or claim, within the State of Missouri, and situated between the Mississippi and Missouri rivers and a line running from the Missouri, at the mouth or entrance of Kanzas river, north one hundred miles, to the northwest corner of the limits of the state of Missouri, and, from thence, east to the Mississippi.

Missouri did not formally move to claim the land south of the Sullivan Line to the mouth of the Des Moines at Keokuk, Iowa became known as Half Breed Tract and was declared part of Iowa when it joined the Union in 1846. Since it is 25 miles (40 km) south of the Sullivan Line it is the southernmost point in Iowa.

== Honey War ==
After Sullivan died in 1830, the Sullivan Line was extended in the west to the Missouri River in 1836 as the U.S. government in the Platte Purchase bought all the land west from the Indian Boundary Line and then permitted Missouri to annex the land. As part of the purchase, Missouri wanted the Sullivan Line resurveyed. Joseph C. Brown who was involved with establishing the Fifth Principal Meridian from which most of land in the Louisiana Territory was mapped was hired by Missouri to resurvey the land. Brown was to say that instead of using the mouth of the Kansas, the northern should have been determined by its relation to the mouth of Ohio River. Brown said the border should be 9.5 miles (15.3 km) north of the Sullivan Line at what is now Lacey-Keosauqua State Park in Keosauqua, Iowa. Brown's Line was not recognized by Iowa. Missouri sent Clark County, Missouri sheriff to collect taxes in the strip and was arrested. According to legend Missouri tax collectors cut down three trees that had honey bee hives to collect honey in lieu of taxes. State militias from both Missouri and Iowa were called out before the governors eventually agreed to let the Supreme Court decide the case which it did in State of Missouri v. State of Iowa, 48 U.S. 660 (1849), upholding the Sullivan Line noting that is how it was written in state's constitution. The line was resurveyed to correct various jogs as disputes were to continue over the line into the 20th century.

== Illinois and Michigan Canal ==
In addition to his surveys in Missouri, Sullivan also surveyed a 20-mile (32 km) strip of land on either side of the Chicago River extending from Lake Michigan to the Fox River (Illinois River tributary). This was to ultimately clear the way for the Illinois and Michigan Canal and eventually the Chicago Sanitary and Ship Canal connecting Lake Michigan, Chicago, Illinois to the Illinois River and ultimately the Mississippi. The survey done in 1818-1819 on land ceded by the Sauk and Meskwaki in the Treaty of St. Louis. The survey resulted in several streets in Chicago having a diagonal that is at odds with the city's grid pattern.
