= List of U.S. county name etymologies (J–M) =

This is a list of U.S. county name etymologies, covering the letters J to M.

== J ==
County name	State	Name origin
Jack County	Texas	Patrick Churchill Jack and his brother William Houston Jack, both soldiers of the Texas Revolution
Jackson County	Alabama	Andrew Jackson, the seventh president of the United States
Jackson County	Arkansas	Andrew Jackson, the seventh president of the United States
Jackson County	Colorado	Andrew Jackson, the seventh president of the United States
Jackson County	Florida	Andrew Jackson, the seventh president of the United States
Jackson County	Illinois	Andrew Jackson, the seventh president of the United States
Jackson County	Indiana	Andrew Jackson, the seventh president of the United States
Jackson County	Iowa	Andrew Jackson, the seventh president of the United States
Jackson County	Kansas	Andrew Jackson, the seventh president of the United States
Jackson County	Kentucky	Andrew Jackson, the seventh president of the United States
Jackson County	Michigan	Andrew Jackson, the seventh president of the United States
Jackson County	Minnesota	Andrew Jackson, the seventh president of the United States
Jackson County	Mississippi	Andrew Jackson, the seventh president of the United States
Jackson County	Missouri	Andrew Jackson, the seventh president of the United States
Jackson County	North Carolina	Andrew Jackson, the seventh president of the United States
Jackson County	Ohio	Andrew Jackson, the seventh president of the United States
Jackson County	Oklahoma	Andrew Jackson, the seventh president of the United States
Jackson County	Oregon	Andrew Jackson, the seventh president of the United States
Jackson County	Tennessee	Andrew Jackson, the seventh president of the United States
Jackson County	Texas	Andrew Jackson, the seventh president of the United States
Jackson County	West Virginia	Andrew Jackson, the seventh president of the United States
Jackson County	Wisconsin	Andrew Jackson, the seventh president of the United States
Jackson Parish	Louisiana	Andrew Jackson, the seventh president of the United States
Jackson County	Georgia	James Jackson, a U.S. Congressman and the 23rd Governor of Georgia
Jackson County	South Dakota	J.R. Jackson, a legislator of the Dakota Territory
James City County	Virginia	Named for James City (Virginia Company) (one of four incorporations of the Virginia Colony), itself named for James I of England by his son, King Charles I
Jasper County	Georgia	William Jasper, a hero of the Battle of Sullivan's Island during the American Revolutionary War
Jasper County	Illinois	William Jasper, a hero of the Battle of Sullivan's Island during the American Revolutionary War
Jasper County	Indiana	William Jasper, a hero of the Battle of Sullivan's Island during the American Revolutionary War
Jasper County	Iowa	William Jasper, a hero of the Battle of Sullivan's Island during the American Revolutionary War
Jasper County	Mississippi	William Jasper, a hero of the Battle of Sullivan's Island during the American Revolutionary War
Jasper County	Missouri	William Jasper, a hero of the Battle of Sullivan's Island during the American Revolutionary War
Jasper County	South Carolina	William Jasper, a hero of the Battle of Sullivan's Island during the American Revolutionary War
Jasper County	Texas	William Jasper, a hero of the Battle of Sullivan's Island during the American Revolutionary War
Jay County	Indiana	John Jay, the first U.S. Secretary of State and first Chief Justice of the Supreme Court
Jeff Davis County	Georgia	Jefferson Davis, president of the Confederate States
Jeff Davis County	Texas	Jefferson Davis, president of the Confederate States
Jefferson County	Alabama	Thomas Jefferson, the third president of the United States
Jefferson County	Arkansas	Thomas Jefferson, the third president of the United States
Jefferson County	Florida	Thomas Jefferson, the third president of the United States
Jefferson County	Georgia	Thomas Jefferson, the third president of the United States
Jefferson County	Idaho	Thomas Jefferson, the third president of the United States
Jefferson County	Illinois	Thomas Jefferson, the third president of the United States
Jefferson County	Indiana	Thomas Jefferson, the third president of the United States
Jefferson County	Iowa	Thomas Jefferson, the third president of the United States
Jefferson County	Kansas	Thomas Jefferson, the third president of the United States
Jefferson County	Kentucky	Thomas Jefferson, the third president of the United States
Jefferson County	Mississippi	Thomas Jefferson, the third president of the United States
Jefferson County	Missouri	Thomas Jefferson, the third president of the United States
Jefferson County	Montana	Thomas Jefferson, the third president of the United States
Jefferson County	Nebraska	Thomas Jefferson, the third president of the United States
Jefferson County	New York	Thomas Jefferson, the third president of the United States
Jefferson County	Ohio	Thomas Jefferson, the third president of the United States
Jefferson County	Oklahoma	Thomas Jefferson, the third president of the United States
Jefferson County	Oregon	Thomas Jefferson, the third president of the United States
Jefferson County	Pennsylvania	Thomas Jefferson, the third president of the United States
Jefferson County	Tennessee	Thomas Jefferson, the third president of the United States
Jefferson County	Texas	Thomas Jefferson, the third president of the United States
Jefferson County	Washington	Thomas Jefferson, the third president of the United States
Jefferson County	West Virginia	Thomas Jefferson, the third president of the United States
Jefferson County	Wisconsin	Thomas Jefferson, the third president of the United States
Jefferson Parish	Louisiana	Thomas Jefferson, the third president of the United States
Jefferson County	Colorado	Named for the extralegal Jefferson Territory (itself named for U.S. President Thomas Jefferson), of which the county was a part from 1859 to 1861
Jefferson Davis County	Mississippi	Jefferson Davis, president of the Confederate States
Jefferson Davis Parish	Louisiana	Jefferson Davis, president of the Confederate States
Jenkins County	Georgia	Charles Jones Jenkins, the 44th Governor of Georgia
Jennings County	Indiana	Jonathan Jennings, the first Governor of Indiana
Jerauld County	South Dakota	H.A. Jerauld, a legislator of the Dakota Territory
Jerome County	Idaho	Named for the town of Jerome, Idaho, named in turn for Jerome Hill, an investor in the North Side Twin Falls Canal Company.
Jersey County	Illinois	The U.S. state of New Jersey
Jessamine County	Kentucky	Named for Jessamine Creek, so called because of the jasmine plants that grow next to it.
Jewell County	Kansas	Colonel Lewis R. Jewell of the Sixth Kansas Cavalry Regiment
Jim Hogg County	Texas	James Hogg, the 20th Governor of Texas
Jim Wells County	Texas	James B. Wells Jr., a judge and Democratic boss in South Texas
Jo Daviess County	Illinois	Joseph Hamilton Daveiss, a soldier killed at the Battle of Tippecanoe
Johnson County	Arkansas	Ben Johnson, a judge in the Arkansas Territory
Johnson County	Georgia	Herschel Vespasian Johnson, a U.S. Senator and the 41st Governor of Georgia
Johnson County	Illinois	Richard Mentor Johnson, a U.S. Congressman and the 9th Vice President of the United States
Johnson County	Iowa	Richard Mentor Johnson, a U.S. Congressman and the 9th Vice President of the United States
Johnson County	Kentucky	Richard Mentor Johnson, a U.S. Congressman and the 9th Vice President of the United States
Johnson County	Missouri	Richard Mentor Johnson, a U.S. Congressman and the 9th Vice President of the United States
Johnson County	Nebraska	Richard Mentor Johnson, a U.S. Congressman and the 9th Vice President of the United States
Johnson County	Indiana	John Johnson, a judge of the Indiana Supreme Court
Johnson County	Kansas	Thomas Johnson, an early Methodist missionary to the Shawnee tribe in Kansas
Johnson County	Tennessee	Thomas Johnson, an early settler of the area
Johnson County	Texas	Middleton Johnson, a Texas Ranger, soldier, and politician
Johnson County	Wyoming	E. P. Johnson, a Cheyenne attorney
Johnston County	North Carolina	Gabriel Johnston, the 6th Colonial Governor of North Carolina
Johnston County	Oklahoma	Douglas H. Johnston, the last governor of the Chickasaw Nation
Jones County	Georgia	James Jones, a U.S. Representative from Georgia
Jones County	Iowa	George Wallace Jones, one of the first two U.S. senators to represent Iowa
Jones County	South Dakota	George Wallace Jones, one of the first two U.S. senators to represent Iowa
Jones County	Mississippi	John Paul Jones, commander of the Continental Navy during the American Revolutionary War
Jones County	North Carolina	Willie Jones, a Revolutionary leader and president of the North Carolina Council of Safety
Jones County	Texas	Anson Jones, the last President of the Republic of Texas
Josephine County	Oregon	Named for a creek, itself probably named after Virginia Josephine Rollins Ort
Juab County	Utah	A Ute word meaning "valley" or "plain"
Judith Basin County	Montana	Named by explorer William Clark for his future wife, Julia "Judith" Hancock
Juneau County	Wisconsin	Solomon Juneau, a French-Canadian trader who helped found and was the first mayor of Milwaukee
Juneau City and Borough	Alaska	Joseph Juneau, a Canadian gold prospector who co-founded the city of Juneau
Juniata County	Pennsylvania	An Iroquoian word, onayutta, meaning "standing stone"

== K ==
County name	State	Name origin
Kalamazoo County	Michigan	The Kalamazoo River which runs through it, itself of uncertain origin: see Etymology of Kalamazoo
Kalawao County	Hawaii	Hawaiian kalawao, "mountain-side wild woods."
Kalkaska County	Michigan	A word invented by Henry Schoolcraft, whose family name was Calcraft; the "K"s may have been added to make the name appear more like a Native American word
Kanabec County	Minnesota	The Snake River which runs through it, itself named for an Ojibwe word, Ginebig, meaning "snake"
Kanawha County	West Virginia	The Kanawha River which runs through it, itself named for an Iroquoian word, ka(ih)nawha, meaning "waterway" or "canoe way"
Kandiyohi County	Minnesota	Dakota name for several lakes, meaning "where the buffalo fish come"
Kane County	Illinois	Elias Kane, a U.S. Senator and the first Illinois Secretary of State
Kane County	Utah	Thomas L. Kane, a Union general during the American Civil War and an influential supporter of the Latter-day Saint movement
Kankakee County	Illinois	A Miami Indian word, teeyaahkiki, meaning "open country"
Karnes County	Texas	Henry Karnes, a soldier of the Texas Revolution
Kauaʻi County	Hawaii	Its largest island, Kauaʻi, itself named for a son of the legendary discoverer of the Hawaiʻian Islands and possibly meaning "place around the neck" or "food season"
Kaufman County	Texas	David Spangler Kaufman, a legislator and diplomat of the Republic of Texas and later a U.S. Congressman
Kay County	Oklahoma	The letter "K", from its designation as "County K" before names were assigned
Kearney County	Nebraska	Fort Kearny, itself named for General Stephen Watts Kearny
Kearny County	Kansas	Stephen Watts Kearny, a general of the U.S. Army active on the American frontier during the Mexican–American War
Keith County	Nebraska	M. C. Keith, a local rancher
Kemper County	Mississippi	Reuben Kemper, an early settler of the area who rebelled against Spanish rule in Spanish West Florida
Kenai Peninsula Borough	Alaska	Kenai Peninsula, a headland named for the Athabascan people, Kahtnuht’ana Dena’ina ("People along the Kahtnu (Kenai River)").
Kendall County	Illinois	Amos Kendall, the editor of an influential Frankfort, Kentucky newspaper who served as the 8th U.S. Postmaster General and an important adviser to President Andrew Jackson
Kendall County	Texas	George Wilkins Kendall, a journalist and Mexican–American War correspondent
Kenedy County	Texas	Mifflin Kenedy, an early rancher and businessman in South Texas
Kennebec County	Maine	An Eastern Abenaki word, /kínipekʷ/, meaning "large body of still water"
Kenosha County	Wisconsin	A Chippewa word meaning "pickerel", a type of fish
Kent County	Delaware	Kent, a county in England
Kent County	Maryland	Kent, a county in England
Kent County	Rhode Island	Kent, a county in England
Kent County	Michigan	James Kent, a jurist who represented Michigan Territory in its dispute with Ohio over the Toledo Strip
Kent County	Texas	Andrew Kent, who died at the Battle of the Alamo during the Texas Revolution
Kenton County	Kentucky	Simon Kenton, a frontiersman and soldier in the Ohio River region
Keokuk County	Iowa	Keokuk, chief of the Sauk tribe
Kern County	California	Edward Kern, an artist and cartographer who accompanied General John C. Frémont's third and fourth expeditions to the Western United States
Kerr County	Texas	James Kerr, an early settler and legislator of the Republic of Texas
Kershaw County	South Carolina	Joseph B. Kershaw, a lawyer, South Carolina legislator, and Confederate general during the American Civil War
Ketchikan Gateway Borough	Alaska	Tlingit Kichx̱áan (Kitschk-hin), meaning "the river belonging to Kitschk" or "Thundering Wings of an Eagle."
Kewaunee County	Wisconsin	Disputed; probably a Chippewa term meaning either "prairie hen" or "I cross a point of land by boat"
Keweenaw County	Michigan	An Ojibwe word, kee-wi-wai-non-ing, which means "portage" or "place where portage is made"
Keya Paha County	Nebraska	Dakota language words Ké-ya Pa-há Wa-kpá, meaning "turtle hill river"
Kidder County	North Dakota	Jefferson Parish Kidder, a U.S. Congressman who represented the Dakota Territory
Kimball County	Nebraska	Thomas L. Kimball, an official of the Union Pacific Railroad
Kimble County	Texas	George C. Kimble, who died at the Battle of the Alamo during the Texas Revolution
King County	Texas	William Philip King, who died at the Battle of the Alamo during the Texas Revolution
King County	Washington	William Rufus King, a U.S. Congressman and the 13th Vice President of the United States; "renamed" in honor of Martin Luther King Jr. (no relation) in 2005
King George County	Virginia	George I of Great Britain
King William	Virginia	William III of England
King and Queen County	Virginia	King William III of England and Queen Mary II of England
Kingfisher County	Oklahoma	Unknown; possibly for a local rancher named David King Fisher, a rancher named John Fisher, or two different settlers named King and Fisher; later given additional currency in association with the belted kingfisher bird
Kingman County	Kansas	Samuel A. Kingman, who was Chief Justice of Kansas at the time of its creation
Kings County	California	The Kings River, itself originally named Río de los Santos Reyes ("River of the Holy Kings")
Kings County	New York	King Charles II of England, Scotland and Ireland
Kingsbury County	South Dakota	George W. Kingsbury and T.A. Kingsbury, two brothers who were members of several territorial legislatures
Kinney County	Texas	Henry Lawrence Kinney, an early settler of Texas
Kiowa County	Colorado	The Kiowa people, a Native American tribe
Kiowa County	Kansas	The Kiowa people, a Native American tribe
Kiowa County	Oklahoma	The Kiowa people, a Native American tribe
Kit Carson County	Colorado	Kit Carson, a frontiersman, explorer, and U.S. Army officer active across much of the American frontier
Kitsap County	Washington	Chief Kitsap of the Suquamish tribe
Kittitas County	Washington	Unknown; probably a Yakama word with any of numerous different meanings
Kittson County	Minnesota	Norman Kittson, a Canadian fur trader, railroad entrepreneur, and mayor of St. Paul
Klamath County	Oregon	The Klamath people, a Native American tribe
Kleberg County	Texas	Robert J. Kleberg, an early settler and veteran of the Texas Revolution
Klickitat County	Washington	The Klickitat people, a Native American tribe
Knott County	Kentucky	James Proctor Knott, the 29th Governor of Kentucky
Knox County	Illinois	Henry Knox, a general during the American Revolutionary War and the first U.S. Secretary of War
Knox County	Indiana	Henry Knox, a general during the American Revolutionary War and the first U.S. Secretary of War
Knox County	Kentucky	Henry Knox, a general during the American Revolutionary War and the first U.S. Secretary of War
Knox County	Maine	Henry Knox, a general during the American Revolutionary War and the first U.S. Secretary of War
Knox County	Missouri	Henry Knox, a general during the American Revolutionary War and the first U.S. Secretary of War
Knox County	Nebraska	Henry Knox, a general during the American Revolutionary War and the first U.S. Secretary of War
Knox County	Ohio	Henry Knox, a general during the American Revolutionary War and the first U.S. Secretary of War
Knox County	Tennessee	Henry Knox, a general during the American Revolutionary War and the first U.S. Secretary of War
Knox County	Texas	Henry Knox, a general during the American Revolutionary War and the first U.S. Secretary of War
Kodiak Island Borough	Alaska	Kodiak Island, from Alutiiq qikertaq, "island."
Koochiching County	Minnesota	An Ojibwe or Cree word meaning "at the place of inlets", referring to the nearby Rainy Lake and Rainy River
Kootenai County	Idaho	The Kootenay (Ktunaxa) people, a Native American tribe
Kosciusko County	Indiana	Tadeusz Kościuszko, a Polish ally of the Americans during the Revolutionary War
Kossuth County	Iowa	Lajos Kossuth, the Governor-President of the Kingdom of Hungary during the Revolution of 1848 who went into exile in the United States
Kusilvak Census Area	Alaska	The Kusilvak Mountains

== L ==
County name	State	Name origin
La Crosse County	Wisconsin	Early explorer Zebulon Pike saw the Indians playing a game similar to lacrosse, a French type of field hockey called such because the rackets resembled a bishop's crozier.
LaMoure County	North Dakota	Named for Judson LaMoure of who served many terms in the Dakota and North Dakota legislatures
La Paz County	Arizona	Named for a ghost town within the county, itself named for the Spanish word meaning "peace"
La Plata County	Colorado	The La Plata Mountains, which were named by Spanish explorers of the Domínguez–Escalante expedition for their reputed silver ore; la plata is Spanish for "silver"
La Porte County	Indiana	French for "the door" or "the port"
LaSalle County	Illinois	René-Robert Cavelier, Sieur de La Salle, an early French explorer of the Mississippi River
La Salle County	Texas	René-Robert Cavelier, Sieur de La Salle, an early French explorer of the Mississippi River
La Salle Parish	Louisiana	René-Robert Cavelier, Sieur de La Salle, an early French explorer of the Mississippi River
Labette County	Kansas	LaBette Creek which runs through it, itself named for French-Canadian fur trapper Pierre LaBette, who settled near the creek's mouth
Lac qui Parle County	Minnesota	French for "lake that speaks"
Lackawanna County	Pennsylvania	Lenape word for "stream that forks"
Laclede County	Missouri	Pierre Laclède, a French fur trader who co-founded the city of St. Louis
Lafayette County	Arkansas	Gilbert du Motier, Marquis de Lafayette, a French general who played a major role in the American Revolutionary War
Lafayette County	Florida	Gilbert du Motier, Marquis de Lafayette, a French general who played a major role in the American Revolutionary War
Lafayette County	Mississippi	Gilbert du Motier, Marquis de Lafayette, a French general who played a major role in the American Revolutionary War
Lafayette County	Missouri	Gilbert du Motier, Marquis de Lafayette, a French general who played a major role in the American Revolutionary War
Lafayette County	Wisconsin	Gilbert du Motier, Marquis de Lafayette, a French general who played a major role in the American Revolutionary War
Lafayette Parish	Louisiana	Gilbert du Motier, Marquis de Lafayette, a French general who played a major role in the American Revolutionary War
Lafourche Parish	Louisiana	Bayou Lafourche (French: "the fork")
Lagrange County	Indiana	Named for Château de la Grange-Bléneau, the home of the Marquis de Lafayette east of Paris, France
Lake County	California	Clear Lake, which dominates the county
Lake County	Colorado	Twin Lakes, two mountain lakes (now a reservoir) located just south of Leadville
Lake County	Florida	Named for the large number of lakes within the county
Lake County	Oregon	Named for the large number of lakes within the county, including Lake Abert, Summer Lake, Hart Lake, and Goose Lake
Lake County	South Dakota	Named for the large number of lakes within the county
Lake County	Illinois	Named for its location on Lake Michigan
Lake County	Indiana	Named for its location on Lake Michigan
Lake County	Michigan	Named for the several small lakes within the county
Lake County	Minnesota	Named for its location on Lake Superior
Lake County	Montana	Flathead Lake, which dominates the county
Lake County	Ohio	Named for its location on Lake Erie
Lake County	Tennessee	Reelfoot Lake, the county's most significant geographic feature along with the Mississippi River
Lake and Peninsula Borough	Alaska	Iliamna Lake and the Alaska Peninsula
Lake of the Woods County	Minnesota	Lake of the Woods, which dominates the county
Lamar County	Alabama	Lucius Quintus Cincinnatus Lamar II, a U.S. Senator, Secretary of the Interior, and Supreme Court justice
Lamar County	Georgia	Lucius Quintus Cincinnatus Lamar II, a U.S. Senator, Secretary of the Interior, and Supreme Court justice
Lamar County	Mississippi	Lucius Quintus Cincinnatus Lamar II, a U.S. Senator, Secretary of the Interior, and Supreme Court justice
Lamar County	Texas	Mirabeau B. Lamar, the second President of the Republic of Texas
Lamb County	Texas	George A. Lamb, who died in the Battle of San Jacinto during the Texas Revolution
Lamoille County	Vermont	Undocumented; possibly a misspelling of the intended name of Lake Champlain, or the French la moelle, meaning "the marrow"
Lampasas County	Texas	Undocumented; possibly for the Lampasas River, the old Lampazos mission in Mexico, or the Spanish name for any of several plants in the vicinity
Lancaster County	Nebraska	Named after the cities of Lancaster, Pennsylvania and Lancaster, England
Lancaster County	Pennsylvania	Lancashire, a county in England
Lancaster County	South Carolina	Lancaster, Pennsylvania
Lancaster County	Virginia	Lancaster, Pennsylvania
Lander County	Nevada	Frederick W. Lander, the chief engineer of a federal wagon route through the area
Lane County	Kansas	James H. Lane, a leader of the Jayhawker abolitionist movement who served as one of the first U.S. senators from Kansas
Lane County	Oregon	Joseph Lane, the first Governor of the Oregon Territory
Langlade County	Wisconsin	Charles Langlade, a fur merchant and one of the first settlers of Wisconsin
Lanier County	Georgia	Sidney Lanier, a Georgia poet
Lapeer County	Michigan	From the French la pierre, meaning "the stone" or "flint"
Laramie County	Wyoming	Jacques La Ramee, a French-Canadian fur trader
Larimer County	Colorado	William Larimer Jr., the founder of Denver
LaRue County	Kentucky	John LaRue, an early settler of the area
Las Animas County	Colorado	The Purgatoire River, which was once known as the Río de las Animas Perdidas en Purgatorio, Spanish for "River of Souls Lost in Purgatory"
Lassen County	California	Peter Lassen, one of General John C. Frémont's guides
Latah County	Idaho	Nez Perce for "the place of pine trees and pestle"
Latimer County	Oklahoma	J.S. Latimer, a member of the Oklahoma Constitutional Convention
Lauderdale County	Alabama	Colonel James Lauderdale, who died during the first Battle of New Orleans
Lauderdale County	Mississippi	Colonel James Lauderdale, who died during the first Battle of New Orleans
Lauderdale County	Tennessee	Colonel James Lauderdale, who died during the first Battle of New Orleans
Laurel County	Kentucky	Named for the mountain laurel trees common in the area
Laurens County	Georgia	Colonel John Laurens, a soldier and statesman during the American Revolutionary War
Laurens County	South Carolina	Henry Laurens, president of the Continental Congress
Lavaca County	Texas	The Lavaca River, itself originally called Les Veches by early French explorers for the wild buffalo that grazed its banks, which was later translated to the Spanish La Vaca, meaning "the cattle"
Lawrence County	Alabama	James Lawrence, a captain in the United States Navy and hero of the War of 1812
Lawrence County	Arkansas	James Lawrence, a captain in the United States Navy and hero of the War of 1812
Lawrence County	Illinois	James Lawrence, a captain in the United States Navy and hero of the War of 1812
Lawrence County	Indiana	James Lawrence, a captain in the United States Navy and hero of the War of 1812
Lawrence County	Kentucky	James Lawrence, a captain in the United States Navy and hero of the War of 1812
Lawrence County	Mississippi	James Lawrence, a captain in the United States Navy and hero of the War of 1812
Lawrence County	Missouri	James Lawrence, a captain in the United States Navy and hero of the War of 1812
Lawrence County	Ohio	James Lawrence, a captain in the United States Navy and hero of the War of 1812
Lawrence County	Tennessee	James Lawrence, a captain in the United States Navy and hero of the War of 1812
Lawrence County	Pennsylvania	USS Lawrence, Oliver Hazard Perry's original flagship at the Battle of Lake Erie during the War of 1812
Lawrence County	South Dakota	"Colonel" John Lawrence, who came to the county as first treasurer after serving in the Dakota Territorial Legislature
Le Flore County	Oklahoma	A prominent local family of Choctaw/French descent
Le Sueur County	Minnesota	Pierre-Charles Le Sueur, a French explorer
Lea County	New Mexico	Joseph Calloway Lea, a captain in the U.S. Army and founder of the New Mexico Military Academy
Leake County	Mississippi	Walter Leake, the Governor of Mississippi
Leavenworth County	Kansas	Colonel Henry Leavenworth, who established the original Fort Leavenworth
Lebanon County	Pennsylvania	A Biblical name meaning "white mountain"
Lee County	Alabama	Robert E. Lee, the highest-ranking general of the Confederate States Army during the American Civil War
Lee County	Arkansas	Robert E. Lee, the highest-ranking general of the Confederate States Army during the American Civil War
Lee County	Florida	Robert E. Lee, the highest-ranking general of the Confederate States Army during the American Civil War
Lee County	Mississippi	Robert E. Lee, the highest-ranking general of the Confederate States Army during the American Civil War
Lee County	North Carolina	Robert E. Lee, the highest-ranking general of the Confederate States Army during the American Civil War
Lee County	South Carolina	Robert E. Lee, the highest-ranking general of the Confederate States Army during the American Civil War
Lee County	Texas	Robert E. Lee, the highest-ranking general of the Confederate States Army during the American Civil War
Lee County	Georgia	Richard Henry Lee, a Virginia statesman who proposed in the Continental Congress that the colonies declare themselves free and independent, leading to the Declaration of Independence
Lee County	Illinois	Richard Henry Lee, a Virginia statesman who proposed in the Continental Congress that the colonies declare themselves free and independent, leading to the Declaration of Independence
Lee County	Iowa	Uncertain; possibly Robert E. Lee, who surveyed the Des Moines Rapids; William Elliot Lee, a land dealer who owned an area of Iowa that included the future county; Marsh, Delevan & Lee of New York, who owned interests in the Half-Breed Tract; or Albert Miller Lea, who surveyed the interior of Iowa
Lee County	Kentucky	Uncertain; either Robert E. Lee or his father, General Light-Horse Harry Lee, the 9th Governor of Virginia
Lee County	Virginia	General Light-Horse Harry Lee, the 9th Governor of Virginia and father of Robert E. Lee
Leelanau County	Michigan	Invented by Henry Schoolcraft, who gave the name "Leelinau" to some Native American women in his stories
Leflore County	Mississippi	Greenwood LeFlore, a Choctaw leader
Lehigh County	Pennsylvania	Derived from the Delaware Indian term Lechauweki or Lechauwekink, meaning "where there are forks"
Lemhi County	Idaho	King Limhi, a figure in the Book of Mormon
Lenawee County	Michigan	Derived from either the Delaware leno or lenno or the Shawnee lenawai, meaning "man"
Lenoir County	North Carolina	William Lenoir, an officer in the American Revolutionary War
Leon County	Florida	Juan Ponce de León, a Spanish explorer
Leon County	Texas	Martín De León, the founder of Victoria, Texas
Leslie County	Kentucky	Preston H. Leslie, the 26th Governor of Kentucky
Letcher County	Kentucky	Robert P. Letcher, the 15th Governor of Kentucky
Levy County	Florida	David Levy Yulee, an industrialist and U.S. Senator
Lewis County	Idaho	Meriwether Lewis, a co-leader of the Lewis and Clark Expedition
Lewis County	Kentucky	Meriwether Lewis, a co-leader of the Lewis and Clark Expedition
Lewis County	Missouri	Meriwether Lewis, a co-leader of the Lewis and Clark Expedition
Lewis County	Tennessee	Meriwether Lewis, a co-leader of the Lewis and Clark Expedition
Lewis County	Washington	Meriwether Lewis, a co-leader of the Lewis and Clark Expedition
Lewis County	New York	Morgan Lewis, the third Governor of New York
Lewis County	West Virginia	Colonel Charles Lewis, a soldier and pioneer leader
Lewis and Clark County	Montana	Meriwether Lewis and William Clark, who undertook the first expedition across the interior of the United States to the Pacific coast
City of Lexington	Virginia	The Battle of Lexington, fought in Lexington, Massachusetts during the American Revolutionary War
Lexington County	South Carolina	The Battle of Lexington, fought in Lexington, Massachusetts during the American Revolutionary War
Liberty County	Florida	Named for the philosophical ideal of liberty
Liberty County	Georgia	Named for the philosophical ideal of liberty
Liberty County	Montana	Named for the philosophical ideal of liberty
Liberty County	Texas	Named for the philosophical ideal of liberty
Licking County	Ohio	The Licking River, the etymology of which is highly conjectural
Limestone County	Alabama	Limestone Creek, itself named for the fact that it flows over limestone bedrock
Limestone County	Texas	From the numerous limestone deposits in the area
Lincoln County	Arkansas	Abraham Lincoln, the 16th President of the United States
Lincoln County	Colorado	Abraham Lincoln, the 16th President of the United States
Lincoln County	Idaho	Abraham Lincoln, the 16th President of the United States
Lincoln County	Kansas	Abraham Lincoln, the 16th President of the United States
Lincoln County	Minnesota	Abraham Lincoln, the 16th President of the United States
Lincoln County	Mississippi	Abraham Lincoln, the 16th President of the United States
Lincoln County	Montana	Abraham Lincoln, the 16th President of the United States
Lincoln County	Nebraska	Abraham Lincoln, the 16th President of the United States
Lincoln County	Nevada	Abraham Lincoln, the 16th President of the United States
Lincoln County	New Mexico	Abraham Lincoln, the 16th President of the United States
Lincoln County	Oklahoma	Abraham Lincoln, the 16th President of the United States
Lincoln County	Oregon	Abraham Lincoln, the 16th President of the United States
Lincoln County	Washington	Abraham Lincoln, the 16th President of the United States
Lincoln County	West Virginia	Abraham Lincoln, the 16th President of the United States
Lincoln County	Wisconsin	Abraham Lincoln, the 16th President of the United States
Lincoln County	Wyoming	Abraham Lincoln, the 16th President of the United States
Lincoln Parish	Louisiana	Abraham Lincoln, the 16th President of the United States
Lincoln County	Georgia	Benjamin Lincoln, a leading general in the American Revolutionary War and the first U.S. Secretary of War
Lincoln County	Kentucky	Benjamin Lincoln, a leading general in the American Revolutionary War and the first U.S. Secretary of War
Lincoln County	Missouri	Benjamin Lincoln, a leading general in the American Revolutionary War and the first U.S. Secretary of War
Lincoln County	North Carolina	Benjamin Lincoln, a leading general in the American Revolutionary War and the first U.S. Secretary of War
Lincoln County	Tennessee	Benjamin Lincoln, a leading general in the American Revolutionary War and the first U.S. Secretary of War
Lincoln County	Maine	The city of Lincoln, England
Lincoln County	South Dakota	Named after Lincoln County, Maine
Linn County	Iowa	Lewis F. Linn, a U.S. Senator who represented Missouri
Linn County	Kansas	Lewis F. Linn, a U.S. Senator who represented Missouri
Linn County	Missouri	Lewis F. Linn, a U.S. Senator who represented Missouri
Linn County	Oregon	Lewis F. Linn, a U.S. Senator who represented Missouri
Lipscomb County	Texas	Abner Smith Lipscomb, a judge and Secretary of State of the Republic of Texas
Litchfield County	Connecticut	The city of Lichfield, England
Little River County	Arkansas	The Little River, which forms part of the county boundary
Live Oak County	Texas	The Texas live oak tree under which the petition for a new county was signed
Livingston County	Illinois	Edward Livingston, the 46th mayor of New York City, a U.S. Congressman and the 11th U.S. Secretary of State
Livingston County	Kentucky	Edward Livingston, the 46th mayor of New York City, a U.S. Congressman and the 11th U.S. Secretary of State
Livingston County	Michigan	Edward Livingston, the 46th mayor of New York City, a U.S. Congressman and the 11th U.S. Secretary of State
Livingston County	Missouri	Edward Livingston, the 46th mayor of New York City, a U.S. Congressman and the 11th U.S. Secretary of State
Livingston Parish	Louisiana	Edward Livingston, the 46th mayor of New York City, a U.S. Congressman and the 11th U.S. Secretary of State
Livingston County	New York	Robert R. Livingston, one of the drafters of the Declaration of Independence and the first Chancellor of New York
Llano County	Texas	The Llano River, itself named for the Spanish llano, meaning "plains"
Logan County	Arkansas	James Logan (1792–1859), a settler, politician and Indian agent in the area.
Logan County	Colorado	John A. Logan, a U.S. Congressman and Union general during the American Civil War
Logan County	Kansas	John A. Logan, a U.S. Congressman and Union general during the American Civil War
Logan County	Nebraska	John A. Logan, a U.S. Congressman and Union general during the American Civil War
Logan County	North Dakota	John A. Logan, a U.S. Congressman and Union general during the American Civil War
Logan County	Oklahoma	John A. Logan, a U.S. Congressman and Union general during the American Civil War
Logan County	Illinois	Dr. John Logan, a pioneer physician and father of General John A. Logan
Logan County	Kentucky	Benjamin Logan, a general and advocate for Kentucky's statehood in the Virginia legislature
Logan County	Ohio	Benjamin Logan, a general and advocate for Kentucky's statehood in the Virginia legislature
Logan County	West Virginia	Logan, a famous chief of the Mingo tribe
Long County	Georgia	Dr. Crawford W. Long, a pioneer anesthesiologist
Lonoke County	Arkansas	For a "lone oak" tree landmark
Lorain County	Ohio	The province of Lorraine, France
Los Alamos County	New Mexico	Los Alamos Ranch School, via Los Alamos National Laboratory, itself named for the Spanish los alamos, meaning "the cottonwoods"
Los Angeles County	California	Spanish for "the angels", originally Pueblo del Río de Nuestra Señora la Reina de Los Ángeles de Porciuncula ("Town of the River of Our Lady, Queen of the Angels")
Loudon County	Tennessee	Fort Loudoun, itself named for John Campbell, 4th Earl of Loudoun
Loudoun County	Virginia	John Campbell, 4th Earl of Loudoun, a commander of British forces during the French and Indian Wars
Louisa County	Iowa	Louisa Massey, an Iowa townswoman who avenged the murder of her brother
Louisa County	Virginia	Princess Louise of Great Britain, the youngest surviving daughter of George II of Great Britain
Loup County	Nebraska	The Loup River, from the French word for "wolf"
Love County	Oklahoma	Overton Love, a member of a Chickasaw family
Loving County	Texas	Oliver Loving, a cattle rancher and pioneer of the cattle drive
Lowndes County	Alabama	William Jones Lowndes, a lawyer and U.S. Congressman from South Carolina
Lowndes County	Georgia	William Jones Lowndes, a lawyer and U.S. Congressman from South Carolina
Lowndes County	Mississippi	William Jones Lowndes, a lawyer and U.S. Congressman from South Carolina
Lubbock County	Texas	Thomas Saltus Lubbock, a Texas Ranger and Confederate soldier during the American Civil War
Lucas County	Iowa	Robert Lucas, the first Governor of the Iowa Territory and the 12th Governor of Ohio
Lucas County	Ohio	Robert Lucas, the first Governor of the Iowa Territory and the 12th Governor of Ohio
Luce County	Michigan	Cyrus G. Luce, the 21st Governor of Michigan
Lumpkin County	Georgia	Wilson Lumpkin, a U.S. Congressman and the 35th Governor of Georgia
Luna County	New Mexico	Solomon Luna, a rancher and political figure
Lunenburg County	Virginia	The Duchy of Brunswick-Lüneburg, an historical polity in northwestern Germany
Luzerne County	Pennsylvania	Anne-César, Chevalier de la Luzerne, French minister to the United States during the American Revolutionary War
Lycoming County	Pennsylvania	Delaware Indian word meaning "sandy creek" or "gravelly creek"
Lyman County	South Dakota	W.P. Lyman, a legislator of the Dakota Territory
City of Lynchburg	Virginia	John Lynch, who founded the first European settlement at the site
Lynn County	Texas	William Lynn, a soldier believed to have died defending the Alamo
Lyon County	Iowa	Nathaniel Lyon, the first Union general killed in the American Civil War
Lyon County	Kansas	Nathaniel Lyon, the first Union general killed in the American Civil War
Lyon County	Kentucky	Nathaniel Lyon, the first Union general killed in the American Civil War
Lyon County	Minnesota	Nathaniel Lyon, the first Union general killed in the American Civil War
Lyon County	Nevada	Nathaniel Lyon, the first Union general killed in the American Civil War

== M ==
County name	State	Name origin
Mackinac County	Michigan	Named for the French interpretation of a Native American word meaning "great turtle", referring to the shape of nearby Mackinac Island as seen from a distance
Macomb County	Michigan	Alexander Macomb, a hero of the War of 1812 and later the Commanding General of the United States Army
Macon County	Alabama	Nathaniel Macon, a U.S. Congressman and President pro tempore of the U.S. Senate
Macon County	Georgia	Nathaniel Macon, a U.S. Congressman and President pro tempore of the U.S. Senate
Macon County	Illinois	Nathaniel Macon, a U.S. Congressman and President pro tempore of the U.S. Senate
Macon County	Missouri	Nathaniel Macon, a U.S. Congressman and President pro tempore of the U.S. Senate
Macon County	North Carolina	Nathaniel Macon, a U.S. Congressman and President pro tempore of the U.S. Senate
Macon County	Tennessee	Nathaniel Macon, a U.S. Congressman and President pro tempore of the U.S. Senate
Macoupin County	Illinois	Miami-Illinois term for the American lotus
Madera County	California	Spanish word for "wood", as lumbering was a major industry in the county at the time
Madison County	Alabama	James Madison, the 4th President of the United States
Madison County	Arkansas	James Madison, the 4th President of the United States
Madison County	Florida	James Madison, the 4th President of the United States
Madison County	Georgia	James Madison, the 4th President of the United States
Madison County	Idaho	James Madison, the 4th President of the United States
Madison County	Illinois	James Madison, the 4th President of the United States
Madison County	Indiana	James Madison, the 4th President of the United States
Madison County	Iowa	James Madison, the 4th President of the United States
Madison County	Kentucky	James Madison, the 4th President of the United States
Madison County	Mississippi	James Madison, the 4th President of the United States
Madison County	Missouri	James Madison, the 4th President of the United States
Madison County	New York	James Madison, the 4th President of the United States
Madison County	North Carolina	James Madison, the 4th President of the United States
Madison County	Ohio	James Madison, the 4th President of the United States
Madison County	Tennessee	James Madison, the 4th President of the United States
Madison County	Texas	James Madison, the 4th President of the United States
Madison County	Virginia	James Madison, the 4th President of the United States
Madison Parish	Louisiana	James Madison, the 4th President of the United States
Madison County	Montana	The Madison River, itself named for James Madison
Madison County	Nebraska	Madison, the capital of Wisconsin and the origin of most early settlers in the county, which was itself named for James Madison
Magoffin County	Kentucky	Beriah Magoffin, the 21st Governor of Kentucky
Mahaska County	Iowa	Chief Mahaska of the Iowa tribe
Mahnomen County	Minnesota	Ojibwe word for wild rice
Mahoning County	Ohio	Lenape word meaning "salt licks"
Major County	Oklahoma	John C. Major, a delegate to the Oklahoma Constitutional Convention
Malheur County	Oregon	The Malheur River which runs through it, itself named after the French word for "misfortune", referring to the unfortunate circumstance that some beaver furs cached near the river by early French Canadian voyageurs were stolen by local Indians
City of Manassas	Virginia	Manassas Junction, of uncertain origin; perhaps after a Jewish pedlar named Manasseh
City of Manassas Park	Virginia	Manassas Junction, of uncertain origin; perhaps after a Jewish pedlar named Manasseh
Manatee County	Florida	The West Indian manatee, an aquatic mammal native to the Florida coast
Manistee County	Michigan	The Manistee River, itself derived from a Native American word which means "river at whose mouth there are islands"
Manitowoc County	Wisconsin	Ojibwe manidoowaak, "spirit place"
Maʻopūtasi County	American Samoa	Samoan for "the only house of chiefs"
Marathon County	Wisconsin	Named for the Battle of Marathon, a famous battle of the Greco-Persian Wars in ancient Greece
Marengo County	Alabama	Named for the Battle of Marengo, fought in Italy during the Napoleonic-era War of the Second Coalition
Maricopa County	Arizona	The Maricopa people, a Native American tribe
Maries County	Missouri	Probably a corruption of the French word marais, meaning "marsh"
Marin County	California	Disputed; possibly named for Chief Marin of the Licatiut tribe or for the bay called Bahia de Nuestra Senora del Rosario la Marinera
Marinette County	Wisconsin	A corrupted form of Marie Antoinette, whose nickname "Marinette" was applied to Marguerite Chevalier, after whom the original town was actually named
Marion County	Alabama	Francis Marion, a Continental Army officer nicknamed the "Swamp Fox" for his activity in the Southern Theater of the American Revolutionary War
Marion County	Arkansas	Francis Marion, a Continental Army officer nicknamed the "Swamp Fox" for his activity in the Southern Theater of the American Revolutionary War
Marion County	Florida	Francis Marion, a Continental Army officer nicknamed the "Swamp Fox" for his activity in the Southern Theater of the American Revolutionary War
Marion County	Georgia	Francis Marion, a Continental Army officer nicknamed the "Swamp Fox" for his activity in the Southern Theater of the American Revolutionary War
Marion County	Illinois	Francis Marion, a Continental Army officer nicknamed the "Swamp Fox" for his activity in the Southern Theater of the American Revolutionary War
Marion County	Indiana	Francis Marion, a Continental Army officer nicknamed the "Swamp Fox" for his activity in the Southern Theater of the American Revolutionary War
Marion County	Iowa	Francis Marion, a Continental Army officer nicknamed the "Swamp Fox" for his activity in the Southern Theater of the American Revolutionary War
Marion County	Kentucky	Francis Marion, a Continental Army officer nicknamed the "Swamp Fox" for his activity in the Southern Theater of the American Revolutionary War
Marion County	Mississippi	Francis Marion, a Continental Army officer nicknamed the "Swamp Fox" for his activity in the Southern Theater of the American Revolutionary War
Marion County	Missouri	Francis Marion, a Continental Army officer nicknamed the "Swamp Fox" for his activity in the Southern Theater of the American Revolutionary War
Marion County	Ohio	Francis Marion, a Continental Army officer nicknamed the "Swamp Fox" for his activity in the Southern Theater of the American Revolutionary War
Marion County	Oregon	Francis Marion, a Continental Army officer nicknamed the "Swamp Fox" for his activity in the Southern Theater of the American Revolutionary War
Marion County	South Carolina	Francis Marion, a Continental Army officer nicknamed the "Swamp Fox" for his activity in the Southern Theater of the American Revolutionary War
Marion County	Tennessee	Francis Marion, a Continental Army officer nicknamed the "Swamp Fox" for his activity in the Southern Theater of the American Revolutionary War
Marion County	Texas	Francis Marion, a Continental Army officer nicknamed the "Swamp Fox" for his activity in the Southern Theater of the American Revolutionary War
Marion County	West Virginia	Francis Marion, a Continental Army officer nicknamed the "Swamp Fox" for his activity in the Southern Theater of the American Revolutionary War
Marion County	Kansas	Named after Marion County, Ohio
Mariposa County	California	Spanish for "butterfly", as Spanish explorers encountered large clusters of butterflies where they named Mariposa Creek
Marlboro County	South Carolina	John Churchill, 1st Duke of Marlborough, an English soldier and statesman
Marquette County	Michigan	Père Jacques Marquette, a French Jesuit missionary and one of the first Europeans to explore and map the upper Mississippi River
Marquette County	Wisconsin	Père Jacques Marquette, a French Jesuit missionary and one of the first Europeans to explore and map the upper Mississippi River
Marshall County	Alabama	John Marshall, the 4th Chief Justice of the Supreme Court and the 4th U.S. Secretary of State
Marshall County	Illinois	John Marshall, the 4th Chief Justice of the Supreme Court and the 4th U.S. Secretary of State
Marshall County	Indiana	John Marshall, the 4th Chief Justice of the Supreme Court and the 4th U.S. Secretary of State
Marshall County	Iowa	John Marshall, the 4th Chief Justice of the Supreme Court and the 4th U.S. Secretary of State
Marshall County	Kentucky	John Marshall, the 4th Chief Justice of the Supreme Court and the 4th U.S. Secretary of State
Marshall County	Mississippi	John Marshall, the 4th Chief Justice of the Supreme Court and the 4th U.S. Secretary of State
Marshall County	Tennessee	John Marshall, the 4th Chief Justice of the Supreme Court and the 4th U.S. Secretary of State
Marshall County	West Virginia	John Marshall, the 4th Chief Justice of the Supreme Court and the 4th U.S. Secretary of State
Marshall County	Kansas	Francis J. Marshall, a military officer who established a ferry there and a member of the first state legislature
Marshall County	Minnesota	William Rainey Marshall, the 5th Governor of Minnesota
Marshall County	Oklahoma	The maiden name of the mother of George A. Henshaw, a delegate to the Oklahoma Constitutional Convention
Marshall County	South Dakota	Marshall Vincent, a county resident
Martin County	Florida	John W. Martin, the 24th Governor of Florida
Martin County	Indiana	John T. Martin of Kentucky
Martin County	Kentucky	John Preston Martin, a U.S. Congressman and state legislator
Martin County	Minnesota	Uncertain; either Henry Martin, a prominent landowner, or Morgan Lewis Martin, a U.S. Congressman from Wisconsin who introduced a bill for the organization of the Minnesota Territory
Martin County	North Carolina	Josiah Martin, the last colonial governor of North Carolina
Martin County	Texas	Wylie Martin, an early settler of the region
City of Martinsville	Virginia	Joseph Martin, a general in the Virginia militia during the American Revolutionary War and the city's founder
Mason County	Illinois	Named for Mason County, Kentucky
Mason County	Kentucky	George Mason, a Founding Father largely responsible for the Bill of Rights
Mason County	West Virginia	George Mason, a Founding Father largely responsible for the Bill of Rights
Mason County	Michigan	Stevens T. Mason, the first Governor of Michigan
Mason County	Texas	Fort Mason, itself named for George Thomson Mason, a U.S. Army lieutenant killed during the Mexican–American War
Mason County	Washington	C.H. Mason, the first secretary of the Washington Territory
Massac County	Illinois	Claude Louis d'Espinchal, marquis de Massiac, a French Naval Minister
Matagorda County	Texas	Spanish for "thick bush", after the canebrakes that once lined the Gulf of Mexico coastline
Matanuska-Susitna Borough	Alaska	Matanuska River and Susitna River
Mathews County	Virginia	Thomas Mathews, a state legislator
Maui County	Hawaii	Named after Maui, the largest and most populous of the five islands that make up the county
Maury County	Tennessee	Abram Poindexter Maury, Sr., a pioneer, farmer, and state senator
Maverick County	Texas	Samuel Augustus Maverick, a lawyer and rancher whose stubborn independence, allegedly for refusing to brand his cattle, is the origin of the word "maverick"
Mayes County	Oklahoma	Named for a prominent family and two chiefs of the Cherokee Nation
McClain County	Oklahoma	Charles M. McClain, a member of the Oklahoma Constitutional Convention
McCone County	Montana	George McCone, a state senator
McCook County	South Dakota	Edwin McCook, a Union Army officer during the American Civil War and Secretary of the Dakota Territory
McCormick County	South Carolina	Cyrus McCormick, a businessman often credited as the inventor of the mechanical reaper
McCracken County	Kentucky	Virgil McCracken, a hero of the War of 1812
McCreary County	Kentucky	James B. McCreary, the 27th and 37th Governor of Kentucky
McCulloch County	Texas	Benjamin McCulloch, a Texas Ranger and Confederate general during the American Civil War
McCurtain County	Oklahoma	Named for three brothers who were each principal chiefs of the Choctaw Nation
McDonald County	Missouri	Alexander McDonald, a soldier during the American Revolutionary War
McDonough County	Illinois	Thomas Macdonough, a naval officer and hero of the War of 1812 who defeated the British on Lake Champlain during the Battle of Plattsburgh
McDowell County	North Carolina	Joseph McDowell Jr., an officer during the American Revolutionary War and later a U.S. Congressman
McDowell County	West Virginia	James McDowell, the 29th Governor of Virginia
McDuffie County	Georgia	George McDuffie, the 55th Governor of South Carolina
McHenry County	Illinois	William McHenry, a military officer in the War of 1812 and the Black Hawk War and a state legislator
McHenry County	North Dakota	James McHenry, an early settler
McIntosh County	Georgia	The McIntosh clan, which pioneered the area
McIntosh County	North Dakota	Edward H. McIntosh, a member of the state legislature
McIntosh County	Oklahoma	A prominent family of the Creek Nation
McKean County	Pennsylvania	Thomas McKean, the 2nd President of Delaware and the 2nd Governor of Pennsylvania
McKenzie County	North Dakota	Alexander McKenzie, a powerful political leader
McKinley County	New Mexico	President William McKinley
McLean County	Illinois	John McLean, first representative in Congress from Illinois and U.S. Senator
McLean County	Kentucky	Judge Alney McLean, an officer in the War of 1812
McLean County	North Dakota	John A. McLean, a prominent citizen and the first mayor of Bismarck
McLennan County	Texas	Neil McLennan, an early settler
McLeod County	Minnesota	Martin McLeod, a pioneer fur trader and member of the council in the territorial legislature
McMinn County	Tennessee	Joseph McMinn, speaker of the state senate and governor of Tennessee
McMullen County	Texas	John McMullen, an Irish founder of a colony in Texas
McNairy County	Tennessee	John McNairy, a Constitutional Convention delegate and U.S. district judge for Tennessee
McPherson County	Kansas	Major-General James Birdseye McPherson, who was killed in the Civil War
McPherson County	Nebraska	Major-General James Birdseye McPherson, who was killed in the Civil War
McPherson County	South Dakota	Major-General James Birdseye McPherson, who was killed in the Civil War
Meade County	Kansas	Major-General George C. Meade
Meade County	South Dakota	Major-General George C. Meade
Meade County	Kentucky	Capt. James Meade, a hero of the War of 1812
Meagher County	Montana	Thomas Francis Meagher, acting Governor of the Montana Territory
Mecklenburg County	North Carolina	The German state of Mecklenburg-Strelitz. Could also be named for Charlotte of Mecklenburg, queen consort of George III of Great Britain.
Mecklenburg County	Virginia	Charlotte of Mecklenburg
Mecosta County	Michigan	Potawatomi chief Mecosta
Medina County	Ohio	The county was named for the Arabian city of Medina, the former home of the Islamic faith's prophet Muhammad
Medina County	Texas	The Medina River, itself named after Pedro Medina, a Spanish engineer
Meeker County	Minnesota	Bradley B. Meeker, jurist and member of the territorial legislature
Meigs County	Ohio	Return J. Meigs Jr., the 4th governor of Ohio and 8th Postmaster General
Meigs County	Tennessee	Return J. Meigs Sr., an officer in the Continental Army
Mellette County	South Dakota	Arthur C. Mellette, the first governor of South Dakota and the last governor of Dakota Territory.
Menard County	Illinois	Pierre Menard, the first Lieutenant Governor of Illinois
Menard County	Texas	Michel Branamour Menard, the founder of Galveston, Texas
Mendocino County	California	Attributive form of the Spanish surname Mendoza, for either Antonio de Mendoza, Viceroy of New Spain, or Lorenzo Suarez de Mendoza, another Viceroy, after Cape Mendocino
Menifee County	Kentucky	Richard Hickman Menefee, a U.S. Congressman
Menominee County	Michigan	The Menominee, who lived in the vicinity, "Menominee" means "rice men" or "rice gatherers"
Menominee County	Wisconsin	For the coterminous Menominee Indian Reservation
Merced County	California	Spanish for "mercy", from the Merced River, named by a traveler after a long dusty journey
Mercer County	Illinois	Hugh Mercer, an officer in the Continental Army killed in the Battle of Princeton
Mercer County	Kentucky	Hugh Mercer, an officer in the Continental Army killed in the Battle of Princeton
Mercer County	New Jersey	Hugh Mercer, an officer in the Continental Army killed in the Battle of Princeton
Mercer County	Ohio	Hugh Mercer, an officer in the Continental Army killed in the Battle of Princeton
Mercer County	Pennsylvania	Hugh Mercer, an officer in the Continental Army killed in the Battle of Princeton
Mercer County	West Virginia	Hugh Mercer, an officer in the Continental Army killed in the Battle of Princeton
Mercer County	Missouri	John F. Mercer, a Revolutionary War general
Mercer County	North Dakota	William Henry Harrison Mercer, an early rancher
Meriwether County	Georgia	General David Meriwether, who served in the Revolutionary War and was a state legislator and a member of congress
Merrick County	Nebraska	Elvira Merrick, wife of Henry W. DePuy, a territorial legislator
Merrimack County	New Hampshire	The Merrimack River, probably of Native American origin, but conjectural
Mesa County	Colorado	Named for Grand Mesa, a large flat-topped geologic formation near Grand Junction
Metcalfe County	Kentucky	Thomas Metcalfe, officer in the War of 1812, and Kentucky governor
Miami County	Indiana	The Miami people, a Native American tribe
Miami County	Kansas	The Miami people, a Native American tribe
Miami County	Ohio	The Miami people, a Native American tribe
Miami-Dade County	Florida	An amalgamation of: Miami, named after the Miami River, which in turn is believed to be derived from the Mayaimi, a Native American tribe that lived in South Florida until the 18th century; Dade County, Florida, named after Major Francis L. Dade, a soldier killed in 1835 in the Second Seminole War
Middlesex County	Connecticut	Middlesex, one of the historic counties of England
Middlesex County	Massachusetts	Middlesex, one of the historic counties of England
Middlesex County	New Jersey	Middlesex, one of the historic counties of England
Middlesex County	Virginia	Middlesex, one of the historic counties of England
Midland County	Michigan	For its location near the geographical center of the Lower Peninsula
Midland County	Texas	For its location midway between Fort Worth and El Paso on the Texas and Pacific Railroad
Mifflin County	Pennsylvania	The first governor of Pennsylvania, Thomas Mifflin
Milam County	Texas	Benjamin Rush Milam, an early Texas colonizer and soldier killed in the Texas Revolution
Millard County	Utah	President Millard Fillmore
Mille Lacs County	Minnesota	French for "thousand lakes"
Miller County	Arkansas	James Miller, the first governor of the Arkansas Territory and a Brigadier General during the War of 1812.
Miller County	Georgia	Judge Andrew J. Miller, who served as a commander of the Oglethorpe Infantry
Miller County	Missouri	John Miller, governor of Missouri
Mills County	Iowa	named for Major Frederick Mills, killed in the Mexican–American War.
Mills County	Texas	John T. Mills, an early judge in Texas
Milwaukee County	Wisconsin	uncertain, but believed to be from a Potawatomi word "Mahnawaukee-Seepe" meaning "gathering place by the river."
Miner County	South Dakota	named for territorial legislators Nelson Miner and Ephriam Miner.
Mineral County	Colorado	Named for the economically valuable mineral resources found in the county
Mineral County	Montana	Named for the economically valuable mineral resources found in the county
Mineral County	Nevada	Named for the economically valuable mineral resources found in the county
Mineral County	West Virginia	Named for the economically valuable mineral resources found in the county
Mingo County	West Virginia	Named for the Mingo Indian tribe
Minidoka County	Idaho	Derived from a Dakota Sioux word meaning "a fountain or spring of water"
Minnehaha County	South Dakota	Derived from a Native American word meaning "river waterfall"
Missaukee County	Michigan	Named for Ottawa chief Missaukee
Mississippi County	Arkansas	The Mississippi River, itself named after the Ojibwe term for "great river"
Mississippi County	Missouri	The Mississippi River, itself named after the Ojibwe term for "great river"
Missoula County	Montana	A contraction of the Flathead word im-i-sul-e-etiku, meaning "near the place of fear"
Mitchell County	Georgia	Uncertain; either Henry Mitchell, a hero of the American Revolutionary War and president of the state senate, or David Brydie Mitchell, governor
Mitchell County	Iowa	Named by Irish settlers for John Mitchel (sic), an Irish nationalist who escaped to the U.S.
Mitchell County	Kansas	William D. Mitchell, a Union Army officer killed during the American Civil War
Mitchell County	North Carolina	Elisha Mitchell, an explorer of Mount Mitchell
Mitchell County	Texas	Asa and Eli Mitchell, early settlers of Stephen F. Austin's colony
Mobile County	Alabama	From the Muskhogean name for the town of Mauvila, found by the first explorers
Modoc County	California	The Modoc people, a Native American tribe
Moffat County	Colorado	David Moffat, a railroad tycoon and banker
Mohave County	Arizona	The Mohave people, a Native American tribe
Moniteau County	Missouri	French spelling of an Indian word meaning "spirit of God"
Monmouth County	New Jersey	Monmouthshire, a county in southeast Wales
Mono County	California	Mono Lake, itself named for an Indian tribe, possibly from monachie, meaning "fly people", referring to an insect that formed part of their diet
Monona County	Iowa	Disputed; possibly the name of a legendary bereaved Indian girl who leaped into the Mississippi River, or the name of an Indian divinity, or an Ottawa word meaning "beautiful land"
Monongalia County	West Virginia	Variant spelling of the Monongahela River, which means "unstable river banks"
Monroe County	Alabama	James Monroe, the 5th President of the United States
Monroe County	Arkansas	James Monroe, the 5th President of the United States
Monroe County	Florida	James Monroe, the 5th President of the United States
Monroe County	Georgia	James Monroe, the 5th President of the United States
Monroe County	Illinois	James Monroe, the 5th President of the United States
Monroe County	Indiana	James Monroe, the 5th President of the United States
Monroe County	Iowa	James Monroe, the 5th President of the United States
Monroe County	Kentucky	James Monroe, the 5th President of the United States
Monroe County	Michigan	James Monroe, the 5th President of the United States
Monroe County	Mississippi	James Monroe, the 5th President of the United States
Monroe County	Missouri	James Monroe, the 5th President of the United States
Monroe County	New York	James Monroe, the 5th President of the United States
Monroe County	Ohio	James Monroe, the 5th President of the United States
Monroe County	Pennsylvania	James Monroe, the 5th President of the United States
Monroe County	Tennessee	James Monroe, the 5th President of the United States
Monroe County	West Virginia	James Monroe, the 5th President of the United States
Monroe County	Wisconsin	James Monroe, the 5th President of the United States
Montague County	Texas	Daniel Montague, a state senator and early surveyor of the county
Montcalm County	Michigan	Louis-Joseph de Montcalm
Monterey County	California	The Spanish words monte and rey, together meaning "king of the forest"; Monterey Bay was named in honor of the Conde de Monterey, the Viceroy of New Spain
Montezuma County	Colorado	Moctezuma II, the last ruler of the Aztecs in central Mexico; the county's world-famous Mesa Verde ruins were once thought to have been built by the Aztecs
Montgomery County	Alabama	Richard Montgomery, an officer during the American Revolutionary War
Montgomery County	Arkansas	Richard Montgomery, an officer during the American Revolutionary War
Montgomery County	Georgia	Richard Montgomery, an officer during the American Revolutionary War
Montgomery County	Illinois	Richard Montgomery, an officer during the American Revolutionary War
Montgomery County	Indiana	Richard Montgomery, an officer during the American Revolutionary War
Montgomery County	Iowa	Richard Montgomery, an officer during the American Revolutionary War
Montgomery County	Kentucky	Richard Montgomery, an officer during the American Revolutionary War
Montgomery County	Maryland	Richard Montgomery, an officer during the American Revolutionary War
Montgomery County	Mississippi	Richard Montgomery, an officer during the American Revolutionary War
Montgomery County	Missouri	Richard Montgomery, an officer during the American Revolutionary War
Montgomery County	New York	Richard Montgomery, an officer during the American Revolutionary War
Montgomery County	North Carolina	Richard Montgomery, an officer during the American Revolutionary War
Montgomery County	Ohio	Richard Montgomery, an officer during the American Revolutionary War
Montgomery County	Texas	Richard Montgomery, an officer during the American Revolutionary War
Montgomery County	Virginia	Richard Montgomery, an officer during the American Revolutionary War
Montgomery County	Kansas	Uncertain; either James M. Montgomery, an abolitionist and preacher, or Richard Montgomery
Montgomery County	Pennsylvania	Uncertain; either Richard Montgomery or Montgomeryshire, a county in Wales, as that part of Pennsylvania was settled by Welsh Quakers
Montgomery County	Tennessee	John Montgomery, an explorer and Indian fighter
Montmorency County	Michigan	Raymond de Montmorency, a French officer who helped the colonies against England during the American Revolutionary War
Montour County	Pennsylvania	Madame Montour, a woman of Indian and French descent who was prominent in the Indian affairs
Montrose County	Colorado	The town of Montrose, which itself is named after the novel A Legend of Montrose by Sir Walter Scott
Moody County	South Dakota	Gideon C. Moody, a territorial legislator and later U.S. Senator
Moore County	North Carolina	Alfred Moore, an officer during the American Revolutionary War and a U.S. Supreme Court justice
Moore County	Tennessee	William Moore, an officer during the War of 1812 and later a state legislator
Moore County	Texas	Edwin Ward Moore, a Republic of Texas naval officer
Mora County	New Mexico	Uncertain; either from names of early settlers, such as Mora Pineda and Garcia de la Mora, or from the Spanish word meaning "blackberry" or "mulberry"
Morehouse Parish	Louisiana	Abraham Morehouse, an early settler
Morgan County	Alabama	Daniel Morgan, an officer during the American Revolutionary War and a U.S. representative
Morgan County	Georgia	Daniel Morgan, an officer during the American Revolutionary War and a U.S. representative
Morgan County	Illinois	Daniel Morgan, an officer during the American Revolutionary War and a U.S. representative
Morgan County	Indiana	Daniel Morgan, an officer during the American Revolutionary War and a U.S. representative
Morgan County	Kentucky	Daniel Morgan, an officer during the American Revolutionary War and a U.S. representative
Morgan County	Missouri	Daniel Morgan, an officer during the American Revolutionary War and a U.S. representative
Morgan County	Ohio	Daniel Morgan, an officer during the American Revolutionary War and a U.S. representative
Morgan County	Tennessee	Daniel Morgan, an officer during the American Revolutionary War and a U.S. representative
Morgan County	West Virginia	Daniel Morgan, an officer during the American Revolutionary War and a U.S. representative
Morgan County	Colorado	The town of Fort Morgan (the county seat), itself named for U.S. Army Colonel Christopher A. Morgan, an aide to Civil War general John Pope
Morgan County	Utah	Jedediah Morgan Grant, a prominent Mormon churchman
Morrill County	Nebraska	Charles Henry Morrill, a regent of the University of Nebraska
Morris County	Kansas	Thomas Morris, a U.S. Senator
Morris County	New Jersey	Lewis Morris, a colonial governor of the Province of New Jersey
Morris County	Texas	W.W. Morris, a prominent attorney in east Texas
Morrison County	Minnesota	William and Allan Morrison, fur traders
Morrow County	Ohio	Jeremiah Morrow, the 9th Governor of Ohio
Morrow County	Oregon	Jackson L. Morrow, a member of the first state legislature
Morton County	Kansas	Oliver Hazard Perry Throck Morton, a jurist and U.S. Senator
Morton County	North Dakota	Oliver Hazard Perry Throck Morton, a jurist and U.S. Senator
Motley County	Texas	Junius William Mottley, a signer of the Texas Declaration of Independence
Moultrie County	Illinois	William Moultrie, an officer during the American Revolutionary War and the 35th Governor of South Carolina
Mountrail County	North Dakota	"Savage" Joseph Mountraille, a prominent voyageur who carried the mail
Mower County	Minnesota	John Mower, a territorial and state legislator
Muhlenberg County	Kentucky	Peter Muhlenberg, a clergyman and soldier during the American Revolutionary War
Multnomah County	Oregon	From the Multnomah village on Sauvie Island, itself named after nemathlonamaq, probably meaning "downriver"
Murray County	Georgia	Thomas W. Murray, a state legislator
Murray County	Minnesota	William Pitt Murray, a state legislator
Murray County	Oklahoma	William H. Murray, the 9th Governor of Oklahoma
Muscatine County	Iowa	The Mascouten tribe of the Potawatomi, a name possibly meaning "burning island"
Muscogee County	Georgia	Muscogee people
Muskegon County	Michigan	The Muskegon River, itself named for the Ojibwa/Chippewa word mashkig, meaning "swamp" or "marsh"
Muskingum County	Ohio	Derived from the Shawnee mshkikwam, "swampy ground"; the Muskingum River flows through the county
Muskogee County	Oklahoma	Muscogee (Creek) Nation
Musselshell County	Montana	Named for mussels found on the banks of the Musselshell River

== See also ==
- Lists of U.S. county name etymologies for links to the remainder of the list
- List of places named for the Marquis de Lafayette
