= Joseph C. Brown =

American surveyor (1784–1849)

- Born: Joseph Cromwell Brown; January 29, 1784; Virginia, U.S.
- Died: February 21, 1849 (aged 65); St. Louis, Missouri, U.S.
- Resting place: Bellefontaine Cemetery
- Occupation: Surveyor
- Known for: Fifth Principal Meridian

Joseph Cromwell Brown (January 29, 1784 – February 21, 1849) was an American surveyor known for establishing the Fifth Principal Meridian's baseline that governs the surveys of all or part of present-day Arkansas, Iowa, Minnesota, Missouri, and South Dakota. The Fifth Principal Meridian was established in 1815 to survey the territory of the Louisiana Purchase, an area of 830,000 square miles (2,100,000 km^{2}).

== Notable surveys ==
- Initial point of the Fifth Principal Meridian (1815) - Brown established the initial point of the Fifth Principal Meridian which was to be used for surveying lands in the Missouri Territory in the present day states of Arkansas, Iowa, Minnesota, Missouri, North Dakota and South Dakota. Brown established the baseline on October 27, 1815 at the mouth of the Mississippi River. Prospect Robbins surveyed north from the mouth of the Arkansas River on the Mississippi. Where the two lines met was the Initial Point which is in Louisiana Purchase State Park in Arkansas.
- First plat of St. Louis, Missouri (1815-1818) - Brown's starting point in the survey was the home of Auguste Chouteau
- Indian Territory Line between Missouri and Indian Territory (1823), present day Kansas - Brown surveys the line south from its origin at the confluence of the Kansas River and Missouri River and then surveys the Missouri-Arkansas line. Virtually all Native Americans south of the Iowa line were to be moved west of line.
- Santa Fe Trail (1825) - surveyed the trail from Jackson County, Missouri to Taos, New Mexico.
- Honey War line (1836) - Brown's most controversial survey was the resurvey of the Sullivan Line, which caused Missouri to claim its border extended 13 miles into Iowa. When Missouri tax collectors attempted to collect revenue from the new territory they were run out of the state. In the process they cut down three trees with honey bee hives for partial payment. The source of the debate was the definition of the Des Moines Rapids. When Missouri entered the Union in 1820 it said its border extended from the rapids on the River Des Moines. Brown couldn't find the rapids at the said intersection with the river-and hence-said the rapids were further north. The Supreme Court was to repudiate what was called "Brown's Line" and uphold the Sullivan Line as the border (although resurveyed).
