= Allan Morrison (fur trader) =

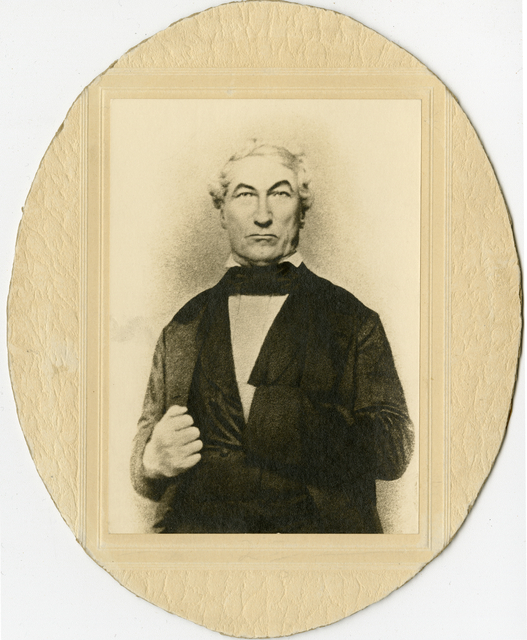
- Morrison, circa 1865

Member of the Minnesota Territorial Legislature House of Representatives
- In office September 14, 1849 – December 31, 1850
- Preceded by: William Sturgis

Personal details
- Born: June 3, 1803 Montreal, Quebec
- Died: November 21, 1877 (aged 74) Present-day White Earth Indian Reservation, Minnesota
- Party: Democratic
- Spouse: Charlotte Charbouillier
- Relations: William Morrison (brother)
- Occupation: Fur trader

Allan Morrison (June 3, 1803 – November 21, 1877), alternatively spelled Allen Morrison, was a Canadian-American fur trader and politician who served in the House of Representatives during the first session of the Minnesota Territorial Legislature.

He is the namesake of Morrison County, Minnesota, along with his brother William.

== Biography ==
Morrison was born in Montreal to Allan Morrison, Sr. and Jane Wadin. Wadin's father was Jean-Étienne Waddens, a fur trader who was killed by Peter Pond in 1782.

Morrison came to northern Minnesota for the fur trade c. 1820 and was associated with William. He successively ran posts at Big Sandy Lake, Leech Lake, Red Lake, Mille Lacs Lake, and Old Crow Wing. He stayed at Old Crow Wing until 1874 and is considered the first white person to settle there. Upon the establishment of Crow Wing County in 1857, Morrison was listed as one of its county commissioners.

Morrison was elected to the Territorial House of Representatives in 1849, following the resignation of William Sturgis. He was a representative until the session ended at the start of 1851.

Morrison, with his brother William, became the namesake of Morrison County when it was founded in 1856. This was in large part due to the fact that Allan forwarded a letter to Alexander Ramsey detailing William's exploration of Lake Itasca. Ramsey circulated the letter and gave it large publicity, perhaps influencing the legislature to name the county after the brothers.

In 1874, Morrison accompanied Chippewas as they were relocated to the White Earth Indian Reservation. He died there on November 21, 1877, and was buried there.

Morrison married Charlotte Charbouillier, a part Chippewa. With her, Morrison fathered eleven children.
