= William Morrison (trader) =

Canadian fur trader and explorer (1785–1866)

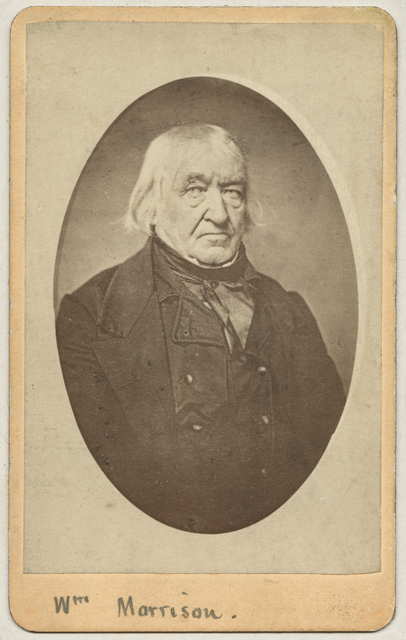
- Morrison, circa 1865
- Born: March 7, 1785; Montreal, Province of Quebec
- Died: August 7, 1866 (aged 81); Sorel, Quebec
- Occupation: Fur trader
- Years active: 1804–1826
- Relatives: Allan Morrison (brother)

William Morrison (March 7, 1785 – August 7, 1866) was a Canadian fur trader and explorer who established numerous trading posts throughout Minnesota and is claimed to have been the first white person to discover Lake Itasca in 1804.

Morrison County, Minnesota is named after him and his brother, Allan.

== Biography ==
Morrison was born in Montreal. His parents were Allan Morrison, Sr. and Jane Wadin. Wadin's father was Jean-Étienne Waddens, a fur trader who was killed by Peter Pond in 1782.

He entered the fur trade in 1802, with the XY Company. By autumn of that year, Morrison had reached Leech Lake and spent the winter at a post on the headwaters of the Crow Wing River. The following winter, in 1804, Morrison discovered Lake Itasca. In a letter written to his brother in 1856, Morrison said he had left Grand Portage in 1802 and reached Leech Lake in September or October of that year. He then wintered at Rice Lake the following winter. Along the way, he had passed Cass Lake and followed the Mississippi River up to Lake Itasca. He claimed that no traces of white men before him. Since he followed the Mississippi, he would've also been the first to identify the lake as the headwaters of the Mississippi, as Henry Schoolcraft's discovery was made decades later.

The XY Company merged into the North West Company in 1805. Morrison continued to work for the company, with his yearly wages from 1812 to 1816 being reported at 1,200 livres. Morrison's territory of operations was bought by John Jacob Astor's American Fur Company. While a member of this company, Morrison was listed as a superintendent of the department and developed a reputation for starving competition out of existence. George Simpson of the Hudson's Bay Company considered Morrison as one of the best and most experienced traders in the region.

Morrison retired in 1826 and went to Berthier, Quebec. The aforementioned letter was sent to Alexander Ramsey in 1856. Ramsey would give it wide publicity, which influenced the Minnesota Legislature to name a county after him when it was organized on February 25, 1856. He died in Sorel, Quebec on August 7, 1866.

Morrison had at least four wives. He married Me-she-pe-she-quay in 1808, Sah-quon-dah-gah-equay c. 1813, Julia Roussain in 1827, and Elizabeth Ann Kittson in 1831. He was the father of at least 16 children.

In addition to the county, Morrison is the namesake of Morrison Island in L'Isle-aux-Allumettes, with the Commission de toponymie du Québec saying he established a residence there in 1826.
