= Missouri v. Iowa =

- Supreme Court of the United States

Decided February 13, 1849
- Full case name: State of Missouri v. State of Iowa
- Citations: 48 U.S. 660 (more) 7 How. 660; 12 L. Ed. 861

Holding
- The true northern boundary of Missouri and southern boundary of Iowa exists along the line laid by Colonel John C. Sullivan in 1816 pursuant to the Osage Treaty of 1815.

Court membership
- Chief Justice Roger B. Taney Associate Justices John McLean · James M. Wayne; John Catron · John McKinley; Peter V. Daniel · Samuel Nelson; Levi Woodbury · Robert C. Grier

Case opinion
- Majority: Catron, joined by unanimous

State of Missouri v. State of Iowa, 48 U.S. (7 How.) 660 (1849), is a 9-to-0 ruling by the Supreme Court of the United States which held that the Sullivan Line of 1816 was the accepted boundary between the states of Iowa and Missouri. The ruling resolved a long-standing border dispute between the two states, which had nearly erupted in military clashes during the so-called "Honey War" of 1839.

== Background ==
In 1808, the Osage Nation ceded all land east of Fort Clark (in what is now west-central Missouri) and north of the Arkansas River to the United States in what became known as the Treaty of Fort Clark. In the wake of the War of 1812, the United States concluded the Treaties of Portage des Sioux, a series of treaties with Native American tribes which (among many other things) further defined the boundaries of the Osage Nation. Colonel John C. Sullivan was appointed to survey the territory and mark the northern boundary line, which became known as the Sullivan Line. However, although the treaty specified a boundary which ran due east, the Sullivan Line tended north slightly and was irregular rather than straight.

The admission of the Missouri Territory as a state to the United States was a highly contentious political issue in the United States, as it was caught up in the issue of slavery. Under the Missouri Compromise of 1820, the state was finally admitted into union. The United States Congress wrestled at length over what the new state's boundaries should be, and in the Act of March 6, 1820, Congress established the northern boundary of the state as follows:

Beginning in the middle of the Mississippi River, on the parallel of thirty-six degrees of north latitude; thence west along the said parallel of latitude to the St. Francois River; thence up and following the course of that river, in the middle of the main channel thereof, to the parallel of latitude of thirty-six degrees and thirty minutes; thence west along the same to a point where the said parallel is intersected by a meridian line passing through the middle of the mouth of the Kansas River, where the same empties into the Missouri River; thence, from the point aforesaid, north along the said meridian line, to the intersection of the parallel of latitude which passes through the rapids of the River Des Moines, making said line correspond with the Indian boundary-line; thence east from the point of intersection last aforesaid, along the said parallel of latitude, to the middle of the channel of the main fork of the said River Des Moines; thence down along the middle of the main channel of the said River Des Moines to the mouth of the same, where it empties into the Mississippi River; thence due east to the middle of the main channel of the Mississippi River; thence down and following the course of the Mississippi River, in the middle of the main channel thereof, to the place of beginning.

The citizens of Missouri established the same boundaries in their state constitution of 1820. After another series of intense congressional debates and parliamentary maneuvers, Congress passed legislation approving Missouri's statehood on February 28, 1821, and the President of the United States signed the bill on March 2.

With the state of Missouri carved out of the Missouri Territory, the Missouri Territory was left unorganized territory. In June 1834, the boundaries of the Michigan Territory were expanded to incorporate what remained of the old Missouri Territory. Just two years later, Congress split the current state of Michigan from the Michigan Territory in preparation for Michigan's entry into statehood, and renamed the territory the Wisconsin Territory. In June 1838, Congress split the Wisconsin Territory in two: What would become the modern state of Wisconsin remained the Wisconsin Territory, while the remainder of the territory was now called the Iowa Territory. The modern state of Iowa was created on December 28, 1846 (with the remaining territory becoming unorganized again until the creation of the Minnesota Territory on March 3, 1849).

Missouri surveyed its northern boundary in 1837. Joseph C. Brown surveyed the boundary according to the description found in the Missouri State Constitution of 1820, which said the northern border of the state began at rapids on the Des Moines River. Brown found a set of small rapids near present-day Keosauqua, Iowa, and ran the border due west from that point. In 1838, the Missouri Legislature passed a law declaring this line its northern boundary, essentially seizing nearly 2,600 square miles (6,700 km^{2}) of land from the Iowa Territory. This territory was agriculturally valuable, and was especially well known for its honey production. In late 1839, the sheriff of Van Buren County, Iowa, arrested the sheriff of Clark County, Missouri, after the latter twice attempted to collect taxes on Iowans living north of the Sullivan Line. Three honey trees were chopped down and taken into Missouri, and both states called out the state militia in what became known as the "Honey War" before cooler heads prevailed and both Iowa and Missouri agreed to submit the dispute to the U.S. Supreme Court (which, under the Constitution, had original jurisdiction over the issue).

The two states petitioned the Supreme Court for redress in 1847.

== Decision ==
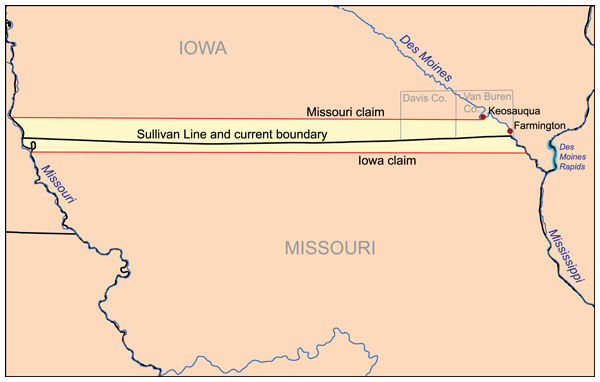
Map depicting the border claims made by Iowa and Missouri, and the Sullivan Line.

Associate Justice John Catron delivered the unanimous opinion of the court.

The state of Missouri alleged that the true border should begin at the "rapids of the Des Moines River," rapids actually on the Des Moines River which were about 9.5 miles (15.3 km) north of the Sullivan Line. The state of Iowa claimed that the rapids in question were the "rapids of the Des Moines River," which in fact were actually rapids in the Mississippi River and the starting point of the Sullivan Line.

Justice Catron reviewed at length the facts which created the boundary dispute. Although he admitted that the Sullivan Line was "not a precisely true" line nor specific to the description contained in the Fort Clark and Portage des Sioux treaties, Justice Catron proposed investigating to what degree the federal government had respected the Sullivan Line. He noted that the federal government had signed more than 15 treaties with various Indian tribes, all of which recognized the Sullivan Line as the northern border of Missouri. Second, he proposed to discover how federal agencies had respected the Sullivan Line. Catron noted that territorial governments and federal land agencies had all used the Sullivan Line as the Missouri boundary, and that land sales agents in Missouri and the various territories had been equally respectful of the line as the state's border. Third, Catron noted that the United States had respected the Sullivan Line in establishing the borders of the various territories north of Missouri.

Justice Catron next attempted to construct the phrase "rapids of the Des Moines River" in an attempt to locate these rapids, as called for in federal legislation granting Missouri statehood and in the Missouri State Constitution of 1820. Iowa had claimed that the "Des Moines rapids" on the Mississippi River were the rapids referred to. But Justice Catron expressed deep scepticism of this claim:

The name given in the act of Congress, taken in connection with its context, would assuredly apply to a rapid in the Des Moines River, if a notorious one existed, as the Mississippi River is not mentioned in the call, and the Des Moines is; nor was the Mississippi River to be reached by that line. Then, again, the rapid is fourteen miles long, and no part of it is called for as an opposite point to found the line upon.

It therefore follows that the claim of Iowa to come south to the middle of the rapid throws us on a doubtful and forced construction of the instrument under consideration; and such a construction we are not willing to adopt, even if Iowa could at this day set up a claim to its adoption, which, for the reasons above stated, we think she cannot be allowed to do.

Catron next reviewed Missouri's attempt to locate a rapids on the Des Moines River. In reviewing Brown's attempts to locate such a rapids, Justice Catron noted that Brown encountered ripples, falls, and shoals, but no rapids. None of these constituted a "notorious rapid...by public reputation", and thus Missouri's claim could not be supported either.

Catron then turned the Court's attention to the Missouri constitution, which also mentioned the Sullivan Line. The problem, as both Missouri and Iowa had pointed out, was that the Sullivan Line did not extend far enough west to meet with the western border of Missouri. Catron dismissed this issue. With almost no discussion, he concluded: "This Court is, then, driven to that call in the Constitution of Missouri which declares that her western boundary shall correspond with the Indian boundary line, and treating the western line of a hundred miles long as a unit and then running east from its northern terminus, it will supply the deficiency of a call for an object that never existed."

Catron held that the proper border was the 1816 Sullivan Line. In an extensive decree, the Court described the Sullivan Line, ordered a commission (composed of a surveyor from Iowa and a surveyor from Missouri) to survey and mark the line, and empowered Chief Justice Taney to enforce the decree or appoint commissioners (in the event of death, disability, or refusal to act).

== Outcomes ==
The boundary commission surveyed and marked the border, and the Supreme Court issued orders and decrees in State of Missouri v. State of Iowa, 51 U.S. 1 (1850), acknowledging their work and establishing the boundary thereby.

However, by 1895, a 20-mile (32 km) portion of the boundary had been disturbed (by natural or man-made causes was unclear), and the boundary markers removed. To resolve the new dispute, Iowa and Missouri jointly filed suit and asked the Supreme Court to once more intervene. In State of Missouri v. State of Iowa, 160 U.S. 688 (1896), the Court again established a commission (this time, adding a surveyor from the state of Illinois as well) to resurvey and remark the missing boundary line. The Court received the report of the second boundary commission, reviewed it at length, and accepted it as the true boundary in State of Missouri v. State of Iowa, 165 U.S. 118 (1897).

== See also ==
- Honey War
- Sullivan Line

== Bibliography ==
- Burns, Louis F. A History of the Osage People. Tuscaloosa, Ala.: University of Alabama Press, 1989.
- "The Chain of Title to Iowa." Annals of Iowa. July 1893.
- Conard, Howard Louis. Encyclopedia of the History of Missouri: A Compendium of History and Biography for Ready Reference. New York: Southern History Co., 1901.
- Erickson, Lori and Stuhr, Tracy. Iowa. Guilford, Conn.: Globe Pequot, 2007.
- Goodspeed, Weston Arthur. The Province and the States: A History of the Province of Louisiana Under France and Spain, and of the Territories and States of the United States. Madison, Wisc.: Western Historical Association, 1904.
- Gue, Benjamin F. History of Iowa From the Earliest Times to the Beginning of the Twentieth Century. New York: Century History Co., 1903.
- McCandless, Perry, and Parrish, William Earl. A History of Missouri: 1820 to 1860. Columbia, Mo.: University of Missouri Press, 2000.
- Monette, John W. History of the Discovery and Settlement of the Valley of the Mississippi, by the three great European powers, Spain, France, and Great Britain: and the Subsequent Occupation, Settlement and Extension of Civil Government by the United States Until the Year 1846. New York: Harper & Bros., 1846.
- Rodriguez, Junius P. The Louisiana Purchase: A Historical and Geographical Encyclopedia. Santa Barbara, Calif.: ABC-CLIO, 2002.
- Santer, Richard Arthur. Michigan, Heart of the Great Lakes. Dubuque, Ia.: Kendall/Hunt Publishing Co., 1977.
- Shoemaker, F.C. Missouri's Struggle for Statehood, 1804-1821. Jefferson City, Mo.: The Hugh Stephens Printing Co., 1916.
- Stock, Janice Beck. Amazing Iowa. Nashville, Tenn.: Rutledge Hill Press, 2003.
