= Fire Prairie Creek =

Stream in Missouri, United States

Coordinates: 39.1377854°N 94.0991122°W

Fire Prairie Creek is a stream in the U.S. state of Missouri, named for the surrounding land (anglicized from Prairie de feu), where a sudden prairie fire once killed three or four Osages.

== See also ==
- List of rivers of Missouri
