= Jean-Étienne Waddens =

Canadian fur trader (1738–1782)

- Born: Baptized 23 April 1738; La Tour-de-Peilz, canton of Vaud, Switzerland
- Died: March 1782; Lac La Ronge
- Occupations: Soldier, fur trader
- Spouse: Marie Josephe De Guire (m. 1761)

Jean-Étienne Waddens (also Vuadens, Wadin) was born in 1738 to Adam Samuel Waddens (Vaudin) and Bernardine Ermon. He was killed during an argument with Peter Pond in 1782 at Lac La Ronge. He came to Canada as a soldier then worked in the fur trade until his death.

Jean-Étienne Waddens remained in Switzerland until at least 1755, however by 1757, he was serving in the colonial regular troops of New France. In May of that year, he renounced Calvinism. He remained in the Montreal area after the city's surrender in 1760.

Jean-Etienne Waddens married Marie Josephe De Guire on November 23, 1761, in St Laurent near Montreal. Their children were Josepha Waddens and Veronique Waddens. In 1763, he became a property holder in Montreal. Another daughter, from a marriage "à la façon du pays" (in the style of the country), Marguerite Waddens married Alexander MacKay, a prominent fur trader. When MacKay was killed on the Tonquin, Marguerite married John McLoughlin, who is best known for serving as Chief Factor and Superintendent of the Columbia District of the Hudson's Bay Company at Fort Vancouver from 1824 to 1845.

Waddens first appeared in fur-trading records as a small independent trader. Beginning in 1772, he was at Grand Portage with eight traders of his traders, who he accompanied. In 1773, he had a licence for two canoes, and an outfit valued at £750, a considerable amount. Between 1773 and 1778, he moved from Lake Winnipeg to the Saskatchewan valley; by 1779 he was on the southern edge of the Athabasca country. In 1779, to counter the idea that separate interests were the bane of the trade, firms trading in the far northwest, including Waddens' joined into one association, known as the “nine parties’ agreement,” a temporary combination usually regarded as the forerunner of the North West Company. At Lac La Rouge, he had a lucrative trade with “the Northward Indians” coming from Lake Athabasca. In late 1781, he was joined by Peter Pond, a man who too represented the company's interests. However, they were on bad terms. In March 1782, Waddens was fatally wounded in a fight, which has been described as murder. In 1783, Mrs Waddens requested Governor of Quebec, Frederick Haldimand to arrest Pond, submitting an affidavit of one of Waddens’ men. Pond was examined in 1785 but was not brought to trial, most likely because Lac La Ronge lay in the territories of the Hudson's Bay Company, beyond the jurisdiction of the Province of Quebec.

Not much is known of Waddens’ character. Alexander Mackenzie's described him as a man of “strict probity and known sobriety”, however it is possibly a formal phrase. Yet, Waddens succeeded in moving up the social ladder from a private in 1757 to a member of the bourgeois of 1782, although not to the rank of the trader-capitalists, like James McGill.

== See also ==
- La Ronge
- John Bethune
