= Des Moines Rapids =

Feature of the Mississippi River

Coordinates: 40.469543°N 91.3707°W

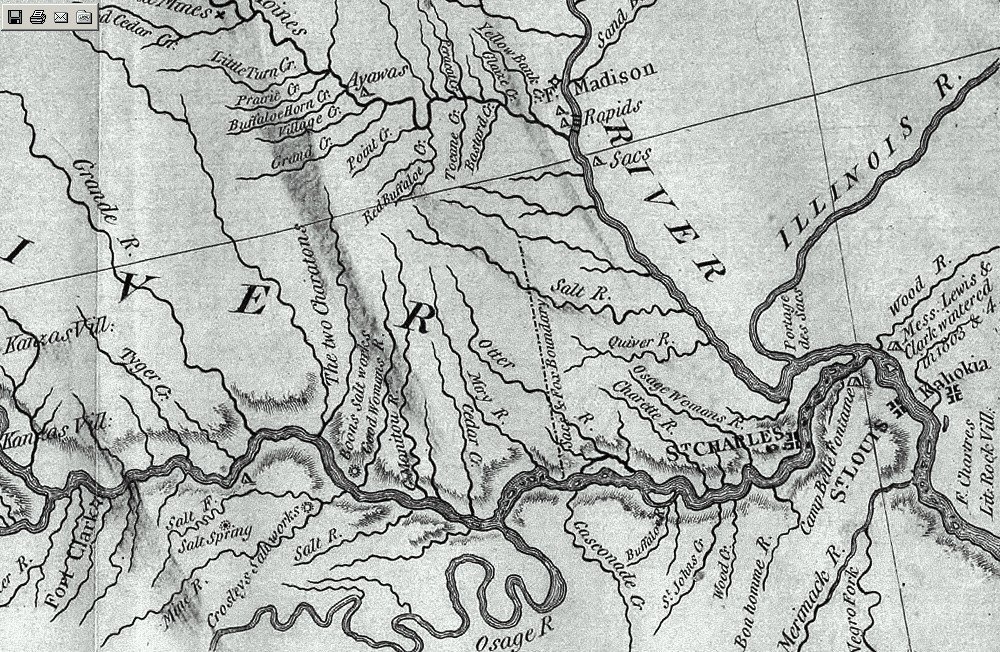
Portion of Lewis and Clark 1814 map depicting the Rapids just south of Ft. Madison.

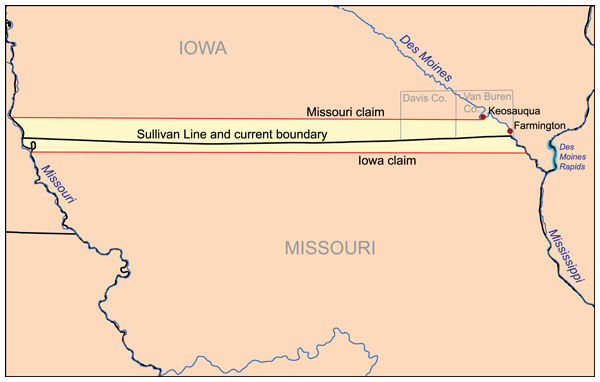
Map showing Des Moines Rapids in relation to the Sullivan Line which was subject of the Honey War.

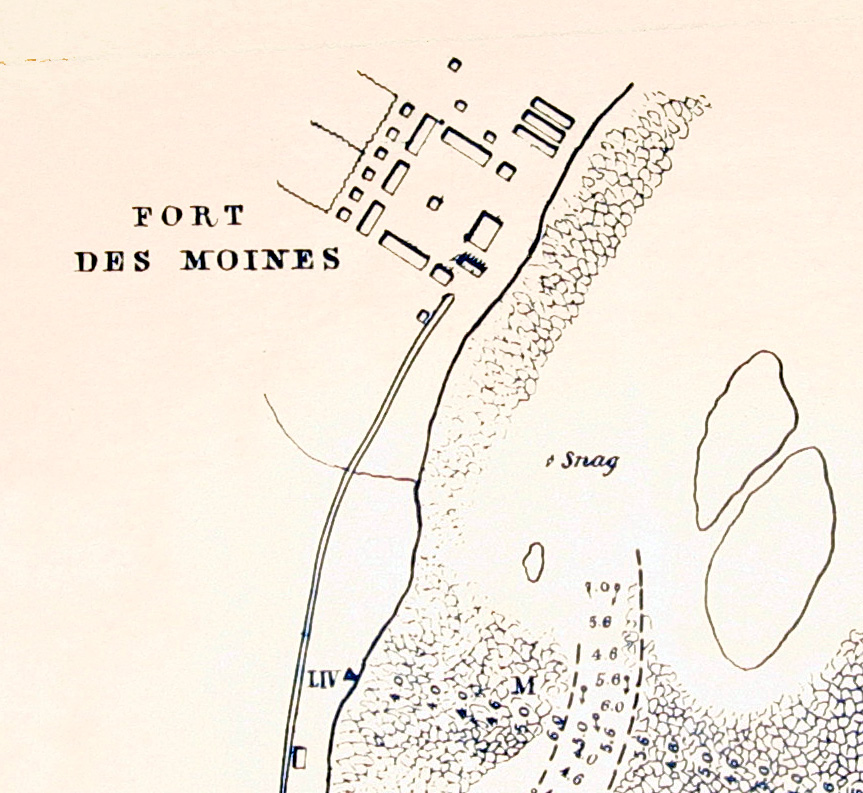
Robert E. Lee map of the head of the Rapids, 1837, showing Fort Des Moines No. 1, later Montrose, Iowa.

The Des Moines Rapids between Nauvoo, Illinois and Keokuk, Iowa-Hamilton, Illinois is one of two major rapids on the Mississippi River that limited Steamboat traffic on the river through the early 19th century.

The rapids just above the confluence of the Des Moines River were to contribute to the Honey War in the 1830s between Missouri and Iowa over the Sullivan Line that separates the two states.

Various attempts to make the river navigable started in 1837 when a channel was blasted through the rapids by U.S. Army Corps of Engineers team led by Robert E. Lee. A canal around the rapids was built in 1877. It is now obliterated by Lock and Dam No. 19.

The other major rapids barring traffic on the Mississippi is the Rock Island Rapids.

The Mississippi in its natural state widens from 2,500 feet (760 m) to 4,500 feet (1,400 m) in width at Nauvoo as it drops 22 feet (6.7 m) over 11 miles (18 km) over shallow limestone rocks to the confluence with Des Moines.

According to records its mean depth through the rapids was 2.4 feet (0.73 m) and "much less" in many places.

Beginning in 1804 United States government-sponsored trading posts for Native Americans as part of the Native American factory system began being built at the rapids. Forts were associated with the trading posts including Fort Johnson, Fort Madison. The forts were burned during the War of 1812. After the war Fort [Edwards] was established and commanded by Zachary Taylor.

In 1816 U.S. Government surveyor John C. Sullivan surveyed a line stretching 100 miles (160 km) north from the confluence of the Kansas River with the Missouri River in Kansas City, Missouri and then back east to the Des Moines River. The distance matched the rapids but when Missouri entered the Union in 1820 its constitution instead referred to the Sullivan line as "the parallel of latitude which passes through the rapids of the River Des Moines."

Missouri did not attempt to clarify the mistake even when the Iowa, Sauk and Meskwaki ceded all land "in Missouri" along the line from the Mississippi to the Indian Territory Line (Sullivan's line going north from the Kansas) in 1824. This created the Half-Breed Tract.

When interest in the rapids increased in the late 1830s as work began on making the rapids navigable, along with Iowa's beginning the process of entering as a state, Missouri took an interest in asserting control of the west side of the rapids. However, thwarted by its constitution which clearly stated the Des Moines River was the border, it instead asserted that there were no rapids where the Sullivan line crossed the Des Moines and conducted a new survey which said the rapids of the Des Moines were about 9.5 miles (15.3 km) north, near Keosauqua, Iowa, and attempted to collect taxes in the area. This prompted the bloodless Honey War, with Iowa resisting the effort.

The Supreme Court was to ultimately decide in State of Missouri v. State of Iowa, 48 U.S. 660 (1849), that Iowa's southern boundary was the foot of the rapids at modern day Keokuk (although accepting the Sullivan Line for the rest of the border from about 20 miles (32 km) west).
