= Half-Breed Tract =

Segment of land designated by the US in the 19th century

A Half-Breed Tract was a segment of land designated in the western states by the United States government in the 19th century specifically for Métis of American Indian and European or European-American ancestry, at the time commonly known as half-breeds. The government set aside such tracts in several parts of the Midwestern prairie region, including in Iowa Territory, Nebraska Territory, Kansas Territory, Minnesota Territory, and Wisconsin Territory.

== Overview ==
Historically, the mixed-blood population in the Pays d'en Haut region surrounding the Great Lakes were typically the descendants of Native American women and White men, often men of French-Canadian or Scots (including Orcadian) origin, who dominated early fur trapping and trade. These men lived far from other Europeans. Others had fathers who were American trappers and traders. The children typically grew up in their mother's tribes, where the fathers and families were offered protection if not full membership.

As relations between the United States government and the tribes became more complex, the mixed-race children often were excluded from benefiting both from the federal laws governing Indians and the political rights of their fathers because of discrimination on both sides. The tribes had their own kinship systems and rules of descent and inheritance. For instance, the Omaha had a patrilineal system, and considered mixed-race children of European or "white" fathers to be white unless formally adopted into the tribe by a man. Other tribes had matrilineal systems, and children were considered born into the mother's clan and took their status from her. Due to hypodescent (assignment of children of a mixed union to the subordinate group) and the fact that many of the mixed-race children grew up in tribes on the frontier, Europeans tended to classify them as being more Indian than white. The fact that their fathers lived "outside" civilized society as mountain men contributed to this notion, as well. The Omaha and other tribal leaders advocated setting land aside for the mixed-blood descendants; usually the intent was to award land to male heads of families.

The relationship between mixed-bloods and their ancestral tribes particularly affected the descendants when the tribes ceded communal lands to the U.S. government in exchange for payment. The rights of mixed-blood descendants to payments or a part in decisionmaking were not usually acknowledged. In 1830 the federal government acknowledged this problem by the Fourth Treaty of Prairie du Chien, which effectively set aside a tract of land for mixed-blood people related to the Oto, Ioway, Omaha, Sac and Fox and Santee Sioux tribes. The treaty granted these "Half-Breed Tracts" as sections of land in a form similar to Indian reservations.

=== Iowa ===
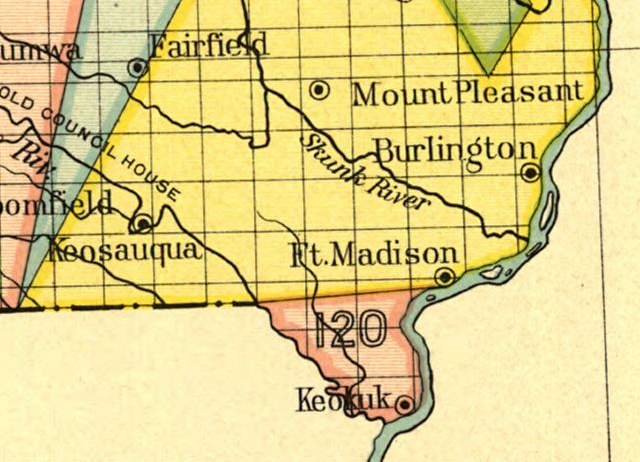
The Lee County Half-Breed Tract, designated as 120 on the map.

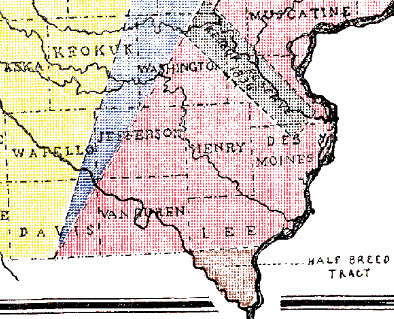
Lee County, Iowa and the "Half Breed Tract" historic detail, from an Iowa 1905 census map

A Half-Breed Tract was located in Lee County, Iowa. An 1824 treaty between the Sauk, the Meskwaki and the United States set aside a reservation for mixed-blood people related to the tribes. Lying between the Mississippi, and Des Moines rivers and below an eastward extension of the Sullivan Line, the Tract occupied an area of approximately 119,000 acres (480 km^{2}). Under the original treaty, the half-breed people had the right to occupy the soil, but individuals could not buy or sell the land.

In 1834 Congress repealed the rule. Immediately afterward, claim jumpers claimed much of the land. The government gave away mixed-blood peoples' claims to the land, effectively ending the provisions of the Half-Breed Tract by 1841.

Mormon leader Joseph Smith, Jr. purchased parts of the Half-Breed Tract, probably in 1837, from a land speculation company. Deeds to most of the land were faulty and could not be held. This left the church with only about 1,000 acres (4.0 km^{2}), including a town called Commerce in Illinois. The Mormons moved to this Illinois site from Far West, Missouri, to escape the Missouri Executive Order 44 issued by Missouri Governor Lilburn Boggs.

=== Nebraska ===
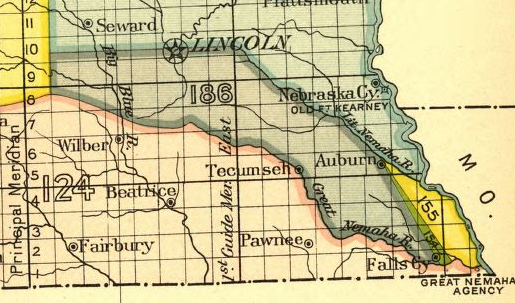
The Nemaha Half-Breed Tract, designated as 154 and 155 on the map.

The Nemaha Half-Breed Reservation was established on July 15, 1830. The tract's eastern border was the Missouri River, and the property extended inland for 10 miles (16 km). The north/south borders were between the Little Nemaha River to the north and the Great Nemaha River, near Falls City to the south. Owners were never required to live on their property and many eventually sold their lands to whites. Nebraska's Half-Breed Tract vanished as a legal entity by 1861.

=== Kansas ===
An 1825 treaty with the Kaw Indians reserved land of 1 square mile (2.6 km^{2}) (640 acres) for each of twenty-three Kaw mixed bloods. The tracts were located on the north bank of the Kansas River from present day Topeka to Williamstown. The purpose of granting the land to the mixed-bloods was to gain their support for the treaty in which the Kaw ceded a large amount of land to the United States in exchange for annuities. Indian Superintendent William Clark said, "Reserves of this kind ... have a good effect in promoting civilization ... an idea of separate property is imparted without which it is vain to think of improving the minds and morals of the Indian."

Several of the Kaw half-breed tracts were to become important sites in Kansas history. In 1827 the Kaw Agency was founded on Tract number 23, allotted to Joseph James, Jr. Here lived the Government Agent to the Kaw; the government farmer Daniel M. Boone, son of the famous pioneer, Daniel Boone; a blacksmith; several mixed-blood Kaw-French traders, and White Plume, recognized by the U.S. government as the head chief of the Kaw. Tract number three, located on the site of Topeka, was to become the site of the Pappan Ferry in the 1840s, a crossing of the Kansas River used by pioneers heading west on the Oregon Trail. Tract four was allotted to Julie Gonville, the maternal grandmother of Charles Curtis, later elected U.S. Senator from Kansas and the Vice President of the United States.

A similar treaty was signed in 1825 between the Osage Indians and the United States. The Osage ceded lands in Missouri, Arkansas, and south of the Arkansas River in Oklahoma in exchange for a reservation in Kansas and Oklahoma. Forty-two tracts of one-square mile each were reserved for the mixed blood children of French traders and Osage women. Most of the tracts were scattered around eastern Kansas but a few were on the Neosho River in Oklahoma.

=== Minnesota and Wisconsin ===
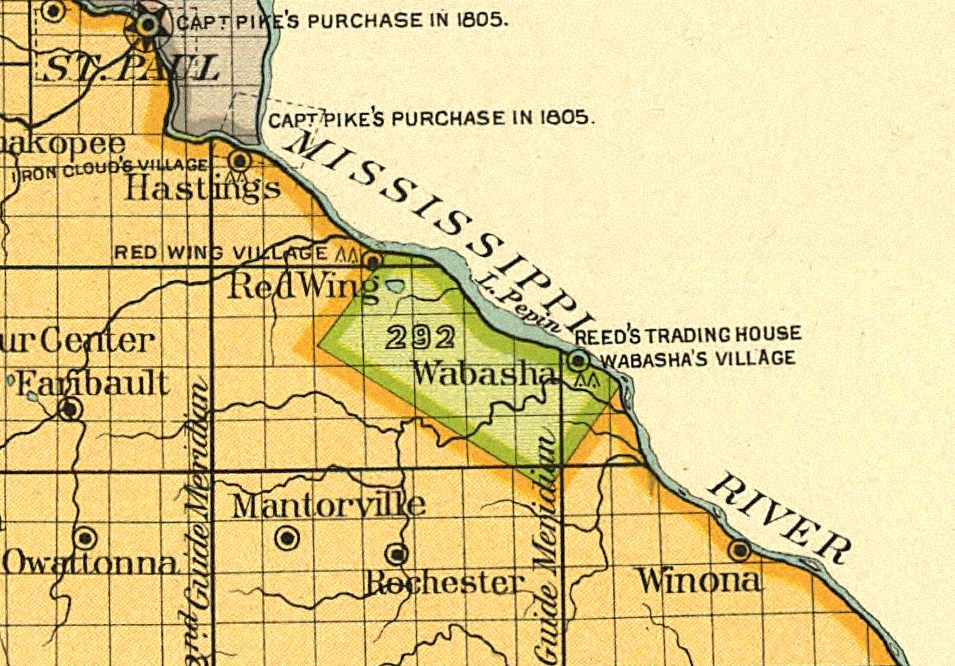
The Minnesota side of the Lake Pepin Half-Breed Tract (designated as 292 on the map).

The 1830 Treaty of Prairie du Chien specified the following boundaries of a Half-Breed Tract centered around Lake Pepin, as follows:

The Sioux bands in council have earnestly solicited that they might have permission to bestow upon the half-breeds of their nation the tract of land within the following limits, to wit: Beginning at the place called the Barn, below and near the village of the Red Wing chief, and running back fifteen miles; thence, in a parallel line with Lake Pepin and the Mississippi, about 32 miles, to a point opposite the river aforesaid; the United States agree to suffer said half-breeds to occupy said tract of country; they holding by the same title, and in the same manner that other Indian titles are held.

This description includes a large part of what is now Wabasha County, Minnesota, and some part of Goodhue County, Minnesota. Despite the petitions of several "half-breed" landowners, who had by then lived there for more than twelve years, the U.S. government took the land in 1852 under the premise of serving as restitution against the Sioux for having violated the terms of an earlier treaty. The land reclamation followed explorers' identification of the area as a "mineral region" with the prospect that, "lead will be found there, and probably copper also."

== See also ==
- Black Hawk Purchase
- Honey War
- Native American tribes in Nebraska
