= National Register of Historic Places listings in Kay County, Oklahoma =

Location of Kay County in Oklahoma

This is a list of the National Register of Historic Places listings in Kay County, Oklahoma.

This is intended to be a complete list of the properties and districts on the National Register of Historic Places in Kay County, Oklahoma, United States. The locations of National Register properties and districts for which the latitude and longitude coordinates are included below, may be seen in a map.

There are 65 properties and districts listed on the National Register in the county, including 3 National Historic Landmarks.

This National Park Service list is complete through NPS recent listings posted October 23, 2026.

== Current listings ==
	Name on the Register	Image	Date listed	Location	City or town	Description
1	One-hundred-and-one Ranch	One-hundred-and-one Ranch	April 11, 1973 (#73001560)	12 miles southwest of Ponca City on State Highway 156; 36°36′47″N 97°08′34″W	Ponca City	
2	101 Rodeo Arena	101 Rodeo Arena	December 4, 2017 (#100001865)	2600 N Ash St. 36°43′11″N 97°05′39″W	Ponca City	
3	Alcorn-Pickrel House		December 2, 2020 (#100005564)	200 North 10th St. 36°42′17″N 97°04′20″W	Ponca City	
4	Attucks Community Center	Attucks Community Center	December 4, 2017 (#100001866)	1001 S 12th St. 36°41′35″N 97°04′12″W	Ponca City	
5	Bennie L. Aupperle Dairy Barn	Bennie L. Aupperle Dairy Barn	December 12, 2012 (#12001038)	8700 N. La Cann Rd. 36°55′17″N 97°01′49″W	Newkirk	
6	Big V Ranch House	Big V Ranch House	August 23, 1984 (#84003068)	Off State Highway 156; 36°37′09″N 97°10′31″W	Ponca City	
7	Blackwell Armory	Blackwell Armory	September 8, 1988 (#88001366)	6th St. and Doolin Avenue; 36°48′40″N 97°17′28″W	Blackwell	
8	Blaine Stadium and Fieldhouse	Blaine Stadium and Fieldhouse	September 8, 1988 (#88001364)	5th and Brookfield Sts. 36°43′06″N 97°04′38″W	Ponca City	
9	Bryson Archeological Site	Bryson Archeological Site	September 20, 1979 (#79001997)	Address Restricted	Newkirk	
10	Chilocco Indian Agricultural School	Chilocco Indian Agricultural School	September 8, 2006 (#06000792)	U.S. Route 77 and E0018 Rd. 36°59′06″N 97°03′45″W	Newkirk	
11	Jack and Helen Cleary House	Jack and Helen Cleary House	January 30, 2020 (#100004170)	13 Hillcrest Dr. 36°42′22″N 97°03′44″W	Ponca City	
12	John and Helen Cleary House		March 17, 2023 (#100008768)	45 Hillcrest Dr. 36°42′22″N 97°03′38″W	Ponca City	
13	Clem and Cliff Filling Station		April 21, 2022 (#100006622)	220 South 4th St. 36°42′06″N 97°04′48″W	Ponca City	
14	Darr School of Aeronautics Hangar No. 3	Darr School of Aeronautics Hangar No. 3	September 8, 2006 (#06000794)	Southwest of the junction of Darr Park Dr. and Lindsey Rd. 36°44′10″N 97°05′50″W	Ponca City	
15	Deer Creek Site		October 15, 1966 (#66000630)	Address Restricted	Newkirk	
16	Daniel J. Donahoe House	Daniel J. Donahoe House	March 10, 1982 (#82003686)	302 S. 7th St. 36°42′04″N 97°04′33″W	Ponca City	
17	Downtown Ponca City Historic District	Downtown Ponca City Historic District	March 21, 2011 (#10001010)	Roughly bounded by Pine St., Chestnut St., 7th St., and Central Ave. 36°42′15″N 97°04′52″W	Ponca City	
18	Electric Park Pavilion	Electric Park Pavilion	September 29, 1976 (#76001563)	300 S. Main; 36°48′06″N 97°16′54″W	Blackwell	
19	First Church of Christ, Scientist	First Church of Christ, Scientist	March 9, 2015 (#15000063)	300 N. 3rd St. 36°42′21″N 97°04′52″W	Ponca City	
20	First Presbyterian Church	First Presbyterian Church	July 15, 2019 (#100004169)	1505 E. Grand Ave. 36°42′12″N 97°03′57″W	Ponca City	
21	First Presbyterian Church of Tonkawa	First Presbyterian Church of Tonkawa	September 22, 1994 (#94001081)	109 S. 4th St. 36°40′43″N 97°18′18″W	Tonkawa	
22	Meade and Eudora Gill House		March 17, 2023 (#100008769)	418 North 2nd St. 36°42′28″N 97°04′57″W	Ponca City	
23	Henry C. Hatashita House		December 13, 2016 (#16000848)	1408 Pioneer Rd. 36°42′53″N 97°03′58″W	Ponca City	
24	Hayes-Kennedy-Rivoli Theater Building	Hayes-Kennedy-Rivoli Theater Building	June 8, 2015 (#15000327)	122-124 S. Main; 36°48′12″N 97°16′59″W	Blackwell	
25	Huston Elementary School	Huston Elementary School	March 4, 2009 (#09000073)	304 Vinnedge Ave. 36°47′11″N 97°17′12″W	Blackwell	Demolished
26	Gov. William W. Jenkins Homestead Site		October 14, 1976 (#76001564)	Address Restricted	Newkirk	
27	Kaw City Depot	Kaw City Depot	October 3, 1979 (#79001996)	West of Kaw City on Washungah Dr. 36°45′53″N 96°51′29″W	Kaw City	
28	Kaw Indian Agency	Kaw Indian Agency	April 11, 1973 (#73001562)	North of the Arkansas River; 36°46′36″N 96°50′00″W	Washunga	
29	Kay County Courthouse	Kay County Courthouse	August 23, 1984 (#84003070)	Courthouse Square; 36°52′51″N 97°03′14″W	Newkirk	
30	Kimbrough Temple C.M.E. Church		September 15, 2020 (#100005555)	1029 South 12th St. 36°41′33″N 97°04′11″W	Ponca City	
31	Lake Ponca Duck Pond Historic District	Lake Ponca Duck Pond Historic District	December 8, 2015 (#15000872)	L.A. Cann Dr. & Edam Rd. 36°43′06″N 97°01′33″W	Ponca City	
32	Larkin Hotel	Larkin Hotel	December 18, 2013 (#13000940)	201 N. Main St. 36°48′20″N 97°17′00″W	Blackwell	
33	Mahoney House and Garage	Mahoney House and Garage	July 3, 1984 (#84003074)	302 N. Main Ave. 36°40′53″N 97°18′33″W	Tonkawa	
34	Marland Estate, Inc. Gatehouse		January 30, 2020 (#100004171)	747 N. 14th St. 36°42′50″N 97°04′02″W	Ponca City	
35	Charlotte Marland House	Charlotte Marland House	July 15, 2019 (#100004168)	919 E. Grand Ave. 36°42′12″N 97°04′21″W	Ponca City	
36	E. W. Marland Mansion	E. W. Marland Mansion	April 11, 1973 (#73001561)	Monument Rd. 36°43′00″N 97°03′37″W	Ponca City	
37	Marland-Paris House	Marland-Paris House	September 28, 1976 (#76001565)	1000 E. Grand; 36°42′11″N 97°04′17″W	Ponca City	
38	James J. McGraw House	James J. McGraw House	December 4, 2017 (#100001867)	400 N. 4th St. 36°42′25″N 97°04′47″W	Ponca City	
39	George and Margaret Miller House		December 6, 2021 (#100006625)	1300 South 8th St. 36°41′27″N 97°04′30″W	Ponca City	
40	Newkirk Central Business District	Newkirk Central Business District	February 23, 1984 (#84003079)	Main and 7th Sts. 36°54′01″N 97°03′10″W	Newkirk	
41	Newkirk Water Purification Plant	Newkirk Water Purification Plant	September 8, 1988 (#88001365)	10th and Elm Sts. 36°52′44″N 97°03′04″W	Newkirk	
42	Nez Perce Reservation		February 15, 1974 (#74001663)	Address Restricted	Tonkawa	
43	Nickles Machine Shop		September 15, 2020 (#100005556)	600 South 1st St. 36°41′53″N 97°05′03″W	Ponca City	
44	Northside Elementary School	Northside Elementary School	February 23, 2009 (#09000074)	720 W. Doolin Ave. 36°48′41″N 97°17′33″W	Blackwell	
45	Parkside Elementary School	Parkside Elementary School	February 23, 2009 (#09000075)	502 E. College Ave. 36°48′05″N 97°16′36″W	Blackwell	
46	Pioneer Woman Statue	Pioneer Woman Statue	August 31, 1978 (#78002238)	Monument Circle; 36°42′36″N 97°03′55″W	Ponca City	
47	Ponca City Coca-Cola Bottling Company		April 4, 2022 (#100007541)	511 South 1st St. 36°41′56″N 97°05′02″W	Ponca City	
48	Ponca City Milling Company Elevator	Ponca City Milling Company Elevator	July 15, 2019 (#100004172)	114 W. Central Ave. 36°42′10″N 97°05′05″W	Ponca City	
49	Ponca City Municipal Airport Hangar	Ponca City Municipal Airport Hangar	September 30, 2019 (#100004173)	2231 Waverly St. 36°44′01″N 97°06′12″W	Ponca City	
50	Ponca City Power Plant	Ponca City Power Plant	July 15, 2019 (#100004174)	1420 N. Union St. 36°43′11″N 97°05′07″W	Ponca City	
51	Poncan Theatre	Poncan Theatre	November 13, 1984 (#84000455)	104 E. Grand Ave. 36°42′11″N 97°04′58″W	Ponca City	
52	Dr. William A.T. and Lillian Robertson House		December 27, 2023 (#100009664)	202 North 6th Street; 36°42′17″N 97°04′38″W	Ponca City	
53	Roosevelt Elementary School	Roosevelt Elementary School	December 4, 2017 (#100001868)	815 E. Highland Ave. 36°42′35″N 97°04′25″W	Ponca City	
54	St. John Baptist Church and Rectory	St. John Baptist Church and Rectory	March 9, 2015 (#15000064)	1009 S. 11th St. 36°41′35″N 97°04′16″W	Ponca City	
55	Santa Fe Depot	Santa Fe Depot	March 12, 2012 (#12000113)	Near junction of S. 1st & W. Oklahoma; 36°42′06″N 97°05′02″W	Ponca City	
56	Sheets House	Sheets House	September 8, 2011 (#11000639)	1350 Peckham Rd; 36°53′01″N 97°04′10″W	Newkirk	
57	Soldani Mansion	Soldani Mansion	June 24, 1982 (#82003687)	819 E. Central Avenue; 36°42′09″N 97°04′25″W	Ponca City	Now the Ponca City Art Center.
58	Temple Emanuel	Temple Emanuel	July 15, 2019 (#100004175)	1201 E. Highland Ave. 36°42′35″N 97°04′10″W	Ponca City	
59	J.P. Tipton Farmstead	J.P. Tipton Farmstead	February 5, 1998 (#98000073)	3.1 miles east of Newkirk; 36°53′01″N 96°59′08″W	Newkirk	
60	Tonkawa Armory	Tonkawa Armory	September 8, 1988 (#88001363)	3rd and North Sts. 36°41′25″N 97°18′10″W	Tonkawa	
61	Tonkawa Lodge No. 157 A.F. & A.M.	Tonkawa Lodge No. 157 A.F. & A.M.	September 6, 2007 (#07000910)	112 N. 7th St. 36°40′45″N 97°18′28″W	Tonkawa	
62	Washington Elementary School	Washington Elementary School	March 4, 2009 (#09000076)	723 W. College Ave. 36°48′05″N 97°17′32″W	Blackwell	
63	WBBZ Radio Station		April 4, 2022 (#100007542)	1601 East Oklahoma Ave. 36°42′04″N 97°03′54″W	Ponca City	
64	Wentz Camp	Wentz Camp	September 3, 2010 (#10000620)	Intersection of L.A. Cann Dr. and E. Prospect Ave. 36°44′18″N 97°01′33″W	Ponca City	
65	White Eagle Park	White Eagle Park	June 8, 2007 (#07000522)	North of White Eagle; 36°36′30″N 97°04′16″W	White Eagle	

== See also ==
- List of National Historic Landmarks in Oklahoma
- National Register of Historic Places listings in Oklahoma
