= KAYE-FM =

Contemporary hit radio station in Tonkawa, Oklahoma

- Tonkawa, Oklahoma; United States
- Frequency: 90.7 MHz
- Branding: 90.7 The Source

Programming
- Language: English
- Format: Contemporary hit radio

Ownership
- Owner: Northern Oklahoma College

Technical information
- Licensing authority: FCC
- Facility ID: 49589
- Class: A
- ERP: 1,200 watts
- HAAT: 20 meters (66 ft)
- Transmitter coordinates: 36°40′42″N 97°17′50″W

Links
- Public license information: Public file; LMS

KAYE-FM (90.7 FM) is a radio station broadcasting a contemporary hit radio format. Licensed to Tonkawa, Oklahoma, United States, the station is owned by Northern Oklahoma College.

== See also ==
- Campus radio
- List of college radio stations in the United States
