= Republic Square (Austin) =

Urban park in Austin, Texas

- Hemphill Square (1888-1976)
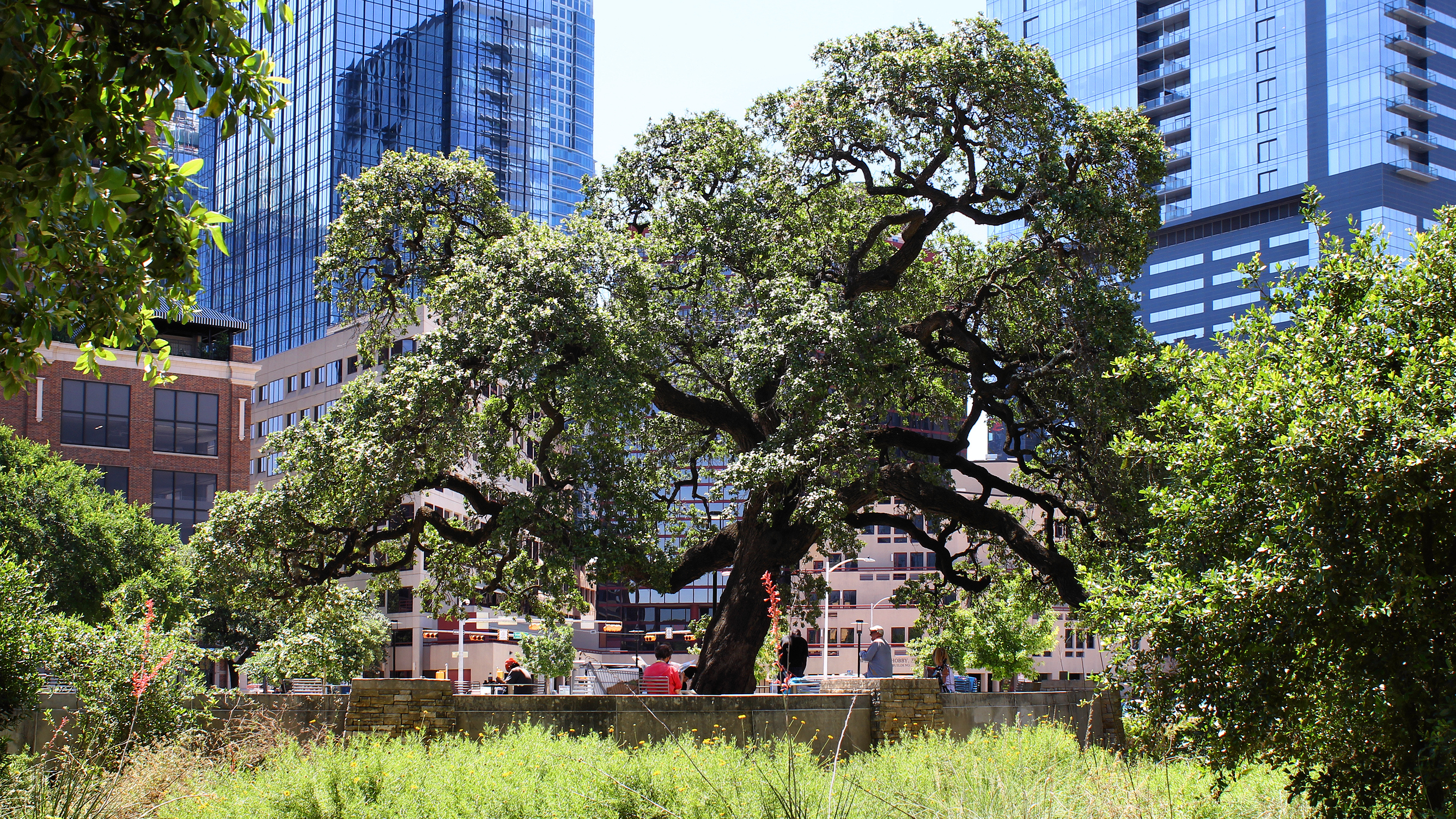
- Type: Public park
- Location: 422 Guadalupe St; Austin, Texas 78703
- Coordinates: 30.2678°N 97.7473°W
- Area: 1 acre (0.40 ha)
- Created: 1888

Republic Square is an urban park in central Austin, Texas. Located in Downtown Austin, the park features a grassy area meant for festivals and events as well as shaded areas under live oak trees. The SFC Farmers' Market meets at the square every Saturday morning.

== History ==
Originally called "Hemphill Square", Republic Square was one of four public squares laid out in the 1839 Waller Plan of Austin by Edwin Waller. The square functioned as a normal urban park up until the mid-twentieth century when it served as a parking lot. The neighborhood surrounding the park became significant for its Mexican American residents throughout the late 1800s and early 1900s. During the United States Bicentennial, the city of Austin transformed the square to its former glory, and was later revitalized again in 2017. Despite many physical changes, the historic heritage Auction Oaks survived and remain a centerpiece to the square till this day.

Anecdotal evidence suggests some Tonkawa used Republic Square as a camp, though specific dates are uncertain. An 2024 Austin American-Statesman article posited the City of Austin invited the Tonkawa to camp at Republic Square in 1842 while Austin was partially evacuated for protection from the Comanche. The article, based on an interview for the film Tonkawa: They All Stay Together, claimed the "triggering event" for the invitation was a "famously vicious [Comanche] raid in the summer of 1842" in which two Simpson children were abducted. But the Simpson children, William and Jane Simpson, were abducted in 1844, not 1842. Other claims that a Republic Square camp c. 1842-1844 acted as a "tripwire" warning of Comanche raids into Austin, and that "Austin has no record of direct Comanche attacks within the city limits during that period" aren't supported historically. A large raid on Austin occurred in the first half of 1843 before the alleged camp was said to have disbanded. The raid resulted in a running battle between Austinites and Comanches with deaths on both sides. Unlike many other skirmishes in which Tonkawa assistance to Texans was detailed, none of the half dozen accounts of the 1843 raid mention Tonkawa involvement: raising alarm, help in pursuit, engaging the raiding party, or ritualistic celebration of Comanches that were killed, raising the question of whether the Tonkawa were encamped in Austin then. The primary source for the camp described in the Austin American-Statesman article is a paragraph from a 1924 interview of William C. Walsh (1836–1924) months before his death in 1924, aged 87. Walsh describes the camp as being near the "Walker Properties" and having been the result of the Tonkawa seeking refuge for two years after the Tonkawa massacre of 1862: "[secured by] the enmity of the Lipans, Comanches and other inimical tribes... these Indians made an united attack on the Tonks (sic) and almost entirely wiped them out." One factor cited for the 1862 massacre was the Tonkawa's support for the Confederacy, the tribes that attacked them being pro-Union. Fleeing to Austin, a fortified city in the Confederacy during the Civil War made sense. Walsh noted it was a mutually beneficial arrangement: Texas' frontier defenses were stretched thin by the Civil War; a Tonkawa presence bolstered defense. Walsh's camp of two years at Republic Square corresponds to an arrival of the Tonkawa c. 1863 until the end of the Civil War when Union forces retook Austin, July, 1865. The 1924 article makes a historical error citing a date of 1842 for the Tonkawa massacre, rather than 1862, perhaps misspoke or misquoted by the paper. Contrary to the 2024 Austin American-Statesman article nothing in the Walsh interview suggests the City of Austin invited the Tonkawa to a camp for Austin's protection. Walsh also relates memories from his childhood playing with some Tonkawa children, but ties to a Republic Square camp per se are uncertain given his statement the Republic Square camp was after the Tonkawa massacre of 1862. Evidence of a sizable Tonkawa camp or camps that "more than doubled the city’s population" at Republic Square between the years 1842-1845 while Austin was partially evacuated is lacking with primary sources of that time indicating the Tonkawa were elsewhere. Sources, including government records, document some Tonkawa having migrated back to Texas, including Austin, c. 1863 after the Tonkawa massacre of 1862, remaining until 1867 after the end of the Civil War, at which time the Tonkawa were escorted out of Austin to Jacksboro, Texas. March 1st and 3rd, 1867, John L. Lovejoy, State Agent for the Tonkawa Tribe, visited the Tonkawa camp in Austin in preparation for escorting them to Jacksboro, but does not specify the location of the camp; Republic Square is plausible given Walsh's claim related to the Tonkawa massacre. In 1905 Mary Smith Mitchell wrote that 200 of the tribe were camped for months "in a grove of live oaks on the ... old court house square", today's Republic Square, but does not give a date or a reason for the camp. Mitchell's camp of months doesn't align with Walsh's camp of two years so may reflect camps at different times. Mitchell also claimed ritualistic cannibalism at Republic Square: "Often serious battles occurred between the Comanches and Tonkawas, and the latter always brought their dead [Comanches] into their camp, on the old court house square [Republic Square]" for ritualistic cannibalism and "war dance". This claim was separate from the camp of 200. Again no source, dates, or context is provided for the claim and is not corroborated in the Walsh article. Mitchell makes no connection between the camps she mentions and the evacuation of Austin between 1842-1845. Mitchell was not a first hand witness to events of Austin's evacuation of 1842-1845.

== Transportation hub ==
Republic Square also functions as a downtown hub for the Capital Metropolitan Transportation Authority bus system, CapMetro Bus. Austin's central bus-rapid transit system, CapMetro Rapid Lines 801 and 803 share a stop next to the square (Fourth Street/Guadalupe Street for southbound buses and Fourth Street/Lavaca Street for northbound). Republic Square station provides transit travelers the option to transfer to local lines, as well as Route 20 to Austin–Bergstrom International Airport. Republic Square was also a proposed stop for the Project Connect's Downtown Transit Tunnel, however, as of June 1, 2023, Republic Square is no longer a planned route on at least the light rail in the scaled back plans.
