= Deer Creek/Bryson Paddock Sites =

- Deer Creek Site
- U.S. National Register of Historic Places
- U.S. National Historic Landmark
- Nearest city: Newkirk, Oklahoma
- Built: 1700-1750
- NRHP reference No.: 66000630

Significant dates
- Added to NRHP: October 15, 1966
- Designated NHL: April 16, 1964

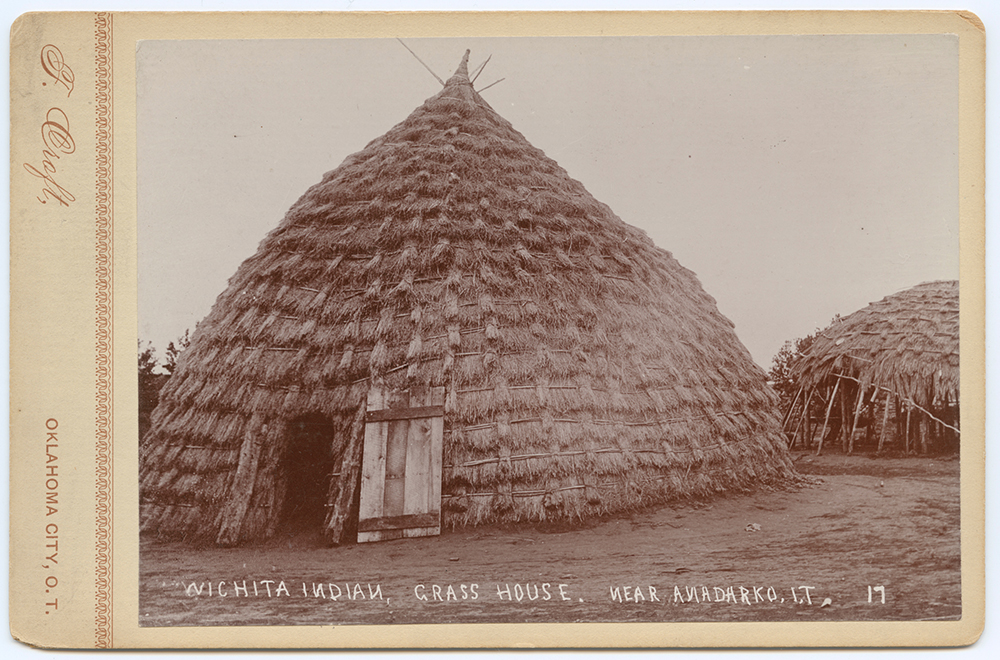
Grass houses, similar to this one, were probably the dwellings of the people of Deer Creek and Bryson Paddock.

The Deer Creek/Bryson Paddock Sites are the remains of 18th century fortified villages of the Wichita tribe located along the Arkansas River in Kay County, Oklahoma. Page 13 of "The Deer Creek Site, Oklahoma", by Mildred Mott Wendel also references a Love site less than 1 1/4 mi. N. of the Bryson Paddock site.

== Location and history ==
The Deer Creek Site is located east of Newkirk, Oklahoma. It is situated on a low bluff overlooking the Arkansas River. The Bryson Paddock site is almost 2 miles (3 km) north also on a low bluff near the river. Both sites were fortified with log and earth stockades surrounding villages of grass-thatched conical houses typical of the Wichita Indians. An archaeologist has estimated that the sites had a population of 3,000 people. Some of the houses were large. One, excavated by archaeologists, had a diameter of 42 feet.

It appears that the inhabitants of the two sites were the Wichita descendants of the Quivira people visited by Francisco Vásquez de Coronado in 1541 in central Kansas and the Rayados visited by Cristobal de Oñate in 1601 near Arkansas City, Kansas. The reason the Quivirans moved south to these sites about 1720 is probably due to two factors. First, the Wichita were under pressure from the Apache and Comanche on the west and the Osage on the east, The Deer Creek/Bryson Paddock sites may have been more secure against attacks. Secondly, located on the Arkansas River, near the head of navigation for large canoes, French traders could transport trade goods to the sites by boat. Archaeologists have found metal tools and glass beads of French and English origin at the site. The Wichita probably traded buffalo skins and meat (jerky) to the French in exchange. Some French traders may have lived at the sites.

The Wichita were known to be excellent farmers and their villages were surrounded by fields of corn, beans, squash, watermelon (introduced by the Spanish), tobacco, native plums, and possibly other fruits and nuts. A metate (grinding stone) weighing hundreds of pounds has been found at the sites which indicates large scale processing of corn meal. They traded their agricultural products to the buffalo hunting Plains Indians.

Archaeologists believe the Wichita moved away from the site in 1758, probably to escape Osage attacks. The French negotiated a peace between the Wichita and the Comanche in 1746, and the Wichita journeyed south to new homes in the Red River valley on the border between Texas and Oklahoma. There they became major allies and trade partners of the Comanche.

== Excavation ==
Joseph Bradfield Thoburn of the University of Oklahoma knew about the site in 1914 and excavated it in 1917. In 1926 he found a map listing a settlement, "Fernandina," in the area of the Deer Creek Site, so he concluded it was the first non-Indian settlement in the area; however, the map was created in 1860. Ethnohistorian Mildren Mott Wedel asserted in 1981 that Fernandina or Ferdinandina had no connection to the 18th century Wichita village. Excavations in 2004 found a large number of trade items.

The Deer Creek Site and the Bryson Paddock site were declared National Historic Landmarks in 1964 and 1979 respectively. The US Army Corps of Engineers currently owns the Deer Creek site. The Bryson Paddock site is under private ownership. To prevent desecration of the sites, the exact location is not disclosed.

== See also ==
- List of National Historic Landmarks in Oklahoma
- National Register of Historic Places listings in Kay County, Oklahoma
