= Kay County, Oklahoma =

County in Oklahoma, United States

- County
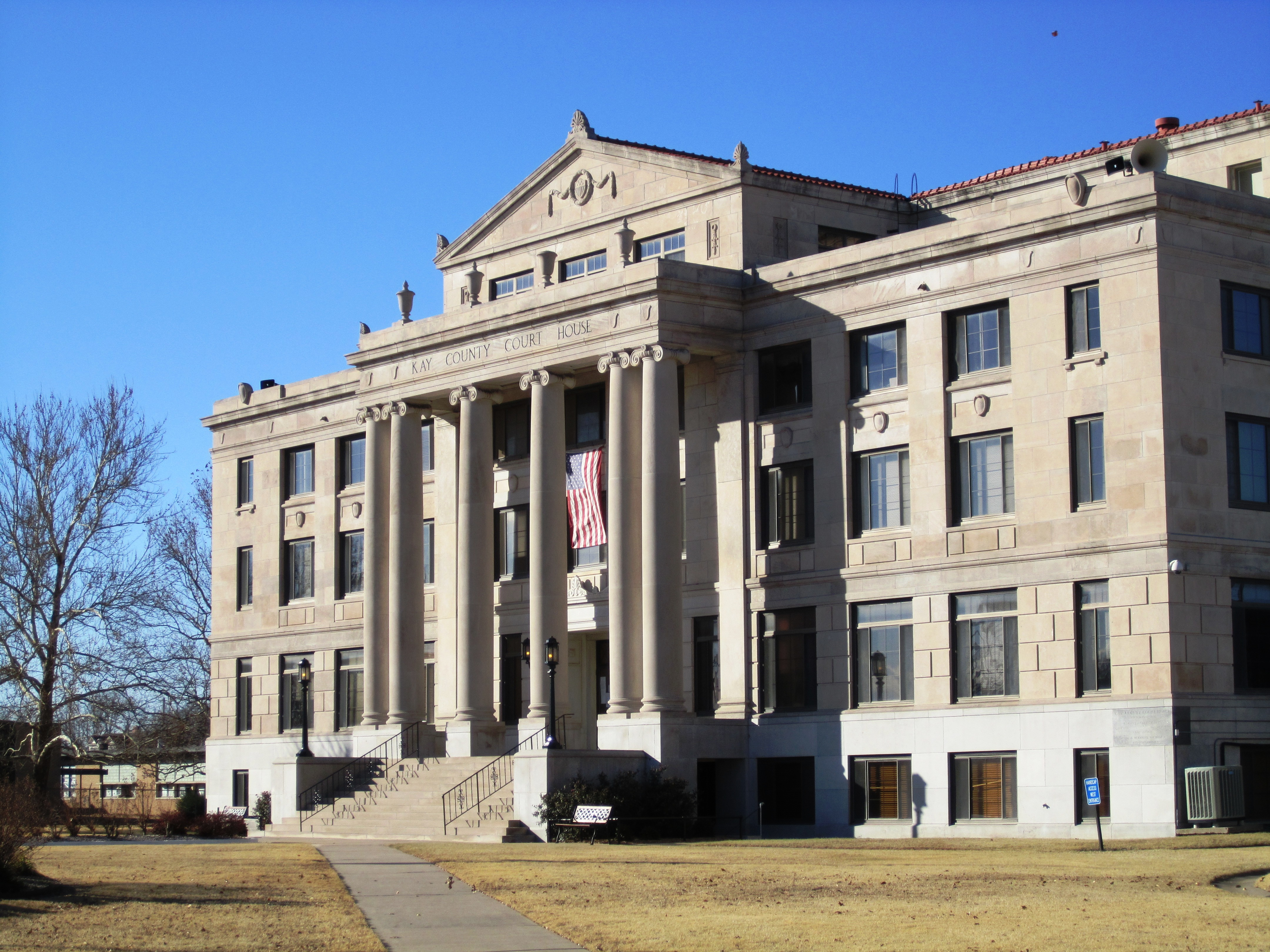
- Kay County Courthouse in Newkirk (2010)

- Location within the U.S. state of Oklahoma
- Coordinates: 36°49′N 97°08′W
- Country: United States
- State: Oklahoma
- Founded: 1893
- Seat: Newkirk
- Largest city: Ponca City

Area
  - Total: 945 sq mi (2,450 km^{2})
  - Land: 920 sq mi (2,400 km^{2})
  - Water: 25 sq mi (65 km^{2}) 2.7%

Population (2020)
  - Total: 43,700
  - Estimate (2025): 43,490 ▼
  - Density: 48/sq mi (18/km^{2})
- Time zone: UTC−6 (Central)
  - Summer (DST): UTC−5 (CDT)
- Congressional district: 3rd
- Website: https://www.courthouse.kay.ok.us/

Kay County is a county located in the U.S. state of Oklahoma. As of the 2020 census, its population was 43,700. Its county seat is Newkirk, and the largest city is Ponca City.

Kay County comprises the Ponca City micropolitan statistical area. It is in north-central Oklahoma on the Kansas state line.

== History ==
The remains of two large 18th-century villages, the Deer Creek/Bryson Paddock Sites, of Wichita Native Americans have been found overlooking the Arkansas River in Kay County. The Osage used Kay County for hunting in the late 18th and early 19th centuries. In 1825, the Osage ceded to the U.S. government their rights to a large expanse of land, including Kay County, and the government gave the Cherokee ownership of the land after their migration to Oklahoma in the 1830s. Before statehood, Kay County was formed from the "Cherokee Strip" or "Cherokee Outlet" and originally designated as county "K". Its name means simply that.

After the Civil War, the Cherokee Nation was forced to allow the federal government to relocate other Native American tribes to settle in the area known as the Cherokee Outlet. The Kansa (Kaw) arrived in June 1873, settling in what became the northeastern part of Kay County. The Ponca followed in 1877. The Nez Perce came from the Pacific Northwest in 1879, but remained only until 1885, when they returned to their earlier homeland. Their assigned land in Oklahoma was then occupied by the Tonkawa and Lipan Apache peoples. Most of Kay County became open to non-Native American settlement in 1893 with the Cherokee Strip Land Run in which thousands of people rushed into Kay County to claim free land.

The Chilocco Indian Agricultural School, north of Newkirk, was a boarding school for Indians that operated from 1884 to 1980. Its enrollment peaked at 1,300 in the 1950s and its graduates include members of 126 Indian tribes. The distinguished old buildings of the school were constructed of local limestone.

In 2010, the Keystone-Cushing Pipeline (Phase II) was constructed north to south through Kay County to Cushing in Payne County.

On September 17, 2024, the National Park Service announced that Kay County and Ponca City were jointly named a World War II Heritage City.

== Geography ==
According to the U.S. Census Bureau, the county has a total area of 945 sq mi (2,450 km^{2}), of which 25 square miles (65 km^{2}) (2.7%) are covered by water. The highest point in Kay County, Oklahoma, is west of North Sage Lane (36′56″12°N, 96′53″40°W), at 1,310 feet (400 m) above sea level. The lowest point is 891 feet (272 m) where the Arkansas River leaves the county.

The northern boundary is the border with Kansas and its eastern boundary is with Osage County. Kaw Lake, a large reservoir on the Arkansas River completed in 1975 includes most of the water area of the county. East of Kaw Lake and the Arkansas River is the region called the Osage Hills or The Osage, a tall-grass prairie region of large livestock, mostly cattle, ranches. West of the Arkansas River the land is flatter and a mixture of cultivated lands and livestock ranches. Principal rivers flowing through the county are the Chikaskia River, the Arkansas River and the Salt Fork of the Arkansas River.

=== Major highways ===
- Interstate 35
- U.S. Highway 60
- U.S. Highway 77
- U.S. Highway 177
- State Highway 11
- State Highway 156

=== Adjacent counties ===
- Cowley County, Kansas (north)
- Garfield County (southwest)
- Grant County (west)
- Noble County (south)
- Osage County (east)
- Sumner County, Kansas (north)

== Demographics ==
Historical population
Census	Pop.	Note	%±
1900	22,530		—
1910	26,999		19.8%
1920	34,907		29.3%
1930	50,186		43.8%
1940	47,084		−6.2%
1950	48,892		3.8%
1960	51,042		4.4%
1970	48,791		−4.4%
1980	49,852		2.2%
1990	48,056		−3.6%
2000	48,080		0.0%
2010	46,562		−3.2%
2020	43,700		−6.1%
2025 (est.)	43,490	▼	−0.5%
U.S. Decennial Census; 1790-1960 1900-1990; 1990-2000 2010

=== 2020 census ===
As of the 2020 United States census, the county had a population of 43,700. Of the residents, 24.3% were under the age of 18 and 19.6% were 65 years of age or older; the median age was 39.4 years. For every 100 females there were 97.4 males, and for every 100 females age 18 and over there were 95.9 males.

The racial makeup of the county was 72.8% White, 2.0% Black or African American, 10.1% American Indian and Alaska Native, 0.6% Asian, 3.1% from some other race, and 10.8% from two or more races. Hispanic or Latino residents of any race comprised 8.4% of the population.

There were 17,571 households in the county, of which 30.8% had children under the age of 18 living with them and 27.5% had a female householder with no spouse or partner present. About 30.3% of all households were made up of individuals and 14.7% had someone living alone who was 65 years of age or older.

There were 20,968 housing units, of which 16.2% were vacant. Among occupied housing units, 67.4% were owner-occupied and 32.6% were renter-occupied. The homeowner vacancy rate was 3.1% and the rental vacancy rate was 17.1%.

=== 2000 census ===
As of the census of 2000, there were 48,080 people, 19,157 households, and 13,141 families residing in the county. The population density was 52 people per square mile (20 people/km^{2}). There were 21,804 housing units at an average density of 24 units per square mile (9.3/km^{2}). The racial makeup of the county was 84.16% White, 1.79% Black or African American, 7.53% Native American, 0.53% Asian, 0.02% Pacific Islander, 1.98% from other races, and 4.00% from two or more races; 4.25% of the population were Hispanic or Latino of any race.

As of 2000, there were 19,157 households, out of which 31.90% had children under the age of 18 living with them, 54.70% were married couples living together, 10.20% had a female householder with no husband present, and 31.40% were non-families. 27.90% of all households were made up of individuals, and 13.10% had someone living alone who was 65 years of age or older. The average household size was 2.45 and the average family size was 2.99. In the county, the population was spread out, with 26.40% under the age of 18, 8.80% from 18 to 24, 25.00% from 25 to 44, 22.80% from 45 to 64, and 17.00% who were 65 years of age or older. The median age was 38 years. For every 100 females there were 93.70 males. For every 100 females age 18 and over, there were 89.90 males.

In 2000, the median income for a household in the county was $30,762, and the median income for a family was $38,144. Males had a median income of $30,431 versus $19,617 for females. The per capita income for the county was $16,643. About 12.40% of families and 16.00% of the population were below the poverty line, including 22.70% of those under age 18 and 9.50% of those age 65 or over.

=== 2021 estimates ===
In 2021, its median household income was $50,391.

== Life expectancy and health ==
Of 3,142 counties in the United States in 2014, the Institute for Health Metrics and Evaluation ranked Kay County 2,441 in the average life expectancy at birth of male residents and 2,650 in the life expectancy of female residents. Life expectancy in Kay county ranked in the bottom 20 percent of U.S. counties. Males in Kay County lived an average of 73.3 years and females lived an average of 78.0 years compared to the national average for life expectancy of 76.7 for males and 81.5 for females. In the 1980-2014 period, the average life expectancy in Kay County for females increased by 0.1 years while male longevity increased by 3.0 years compared to the national average for the same period of an increased life expectancy of 4.0 years for women and 6.7 years for men.

In 2020, the Robert Wood Johnson Foundation ranked Kay country as 47th of 77 counties in Oklahoma in "health outcomes," as measured by length and quality of life.

=== Impact of COVID-19 ===
As of December 22, 2022, Oklahoma has been impacted more by the COVID pandemic (2020-?) than the average U.S. State. Statistics for the U.S. as a whole are 331 deaths per 100,000 population with 68 percent of the population fully vaccinated. The comparable statistics for Oklahoma are 405 deaths per 100,000 population with 59 percent of the population fully vaccinated. Kay County has been impacted more by COVID than the average county in Oklahoma. 238 COVID deaths have been recorded in Kay County. The COVID death rate was .00547 (547 deaths per 100,000 residents). Forty-five percent of Kay County residents are fully vaccinated.

== Politics ==
Kay County, like the rest of Oklahoma, is heavily Republican. Republicans have carried the county with a majority of the vote in all but one election since 1948, and have won greater than 70% of the county's vote in every election since 2004.

Voter Registration and Party Enrollment as of June 30, 2023
Party	Number of Voters	Percentage
Democratic	5,491	21.81%
Republican	14,797	58.78%
Others	4,885	19.41%
Total	25,173	100%

United States presidential election results for Kay County, Oklahoma
Year	Republican		Democratic		Third party(ies)	
Year	No.	%	No.	%	No.	%
1908	2,754	50.91%	2,511	46.41%	145	2.68%
1912	2,508	47.62%	2,380	45.19%	379	7.20%
1916	2,482	46.67%	2,340	44.00%	496	9.33%
1920	5,959	55.50%	4,546	42.34%	231	2.15%
1924	7,392	51.16%	6,049	41.87%	1,007	6.97%
1928	13,829	76.15%	4,196	23.10%	136	0.75%
1932	5,884	31.42%	12,841	68.58%	0	0.00%
1936	6,671	35.77%	11,846	63.52%	132	0.71%
1940	10,003	47.90%	10,725	51.36%	156	0.75%
1944	9,498	52.07%	8,656	47.45%	88	0.48%
1948	8,982	47.02%	10,119	52.98%	0	0.00%
1952	16,460	66.26%	8,382	33.74%	0	0.00%
1956	14,837	64.77%	8,071	35.23%	0	0.00%
1960	15,156	64.76%	8,249	35.24%	0	0.00%
1964	12,033	51.58%	11,296	48.42%	0	0.00%
1968	12,751	59.06%	6,031	27.93%	2,809	13.01%
1972	17,244	78.44%	4,246	19.31%	494	2.25%
1976	12,441	56.33%	9,371	42.43%	274	1.24%
1980	15,004	67.17%	6,449	28.87%	884	3.96%
1984	16,731	73.03%	6,044	26.38%	136	0.59%
1988	12,646	61.50%	7,751	37.69%	167	0.81%
1992	9,115	39.93%	6,643	29.10%	7,070	30.97%
1996	9,741	49.92%	6,882	35.27%	2,891	14.82%
2000	11,768	64.79%	6,122	33.71%	272	1.50%
2004	14,121	70.33%	5,957	29.67%	0	0.00%
2008	13,230	70.78%	5,463	29.22%	0	0.00%
2012	11,499	71.31%	4,627	28.69%	0	0.00%
2016	12,172	72.44%	3,738	22.25%	893	5.31%
2020	12,834	74.40%	4,040	23.42%	375	2.17%
2024	12,483	73.81%	4,136	24.45%	294	1.74%

== Communities ==
=== Cities ===
- Blackwell
- Kaw City
- Newkirk (county seat)
- Ponca City (largest city) (partially in Osage County)(best known as "Ponca")
- Tonkawa

=== Towns ===
- Braman
- Kildare

=== Census-designated places ===
- Nardin
- Peckham
- Tonkawa Tribal Housing
- White Eagle

=== Other unincorporated community ===
- Chilocco

== Notable people ==
- Joseph James, Mixed-blood Kaw native American, died in Kay County in 1898.
- Les Layton, baseball player.
- Jim Reese, former member of the Oklahoma House of Representatives and since 2011 the commissioner of the Oklahoma Department of Agriculture, was born in Kay County c. 1957.
- E.W. Marland, 10th Governor of Oklahoma, U.S. Congressman, and Oil tycoon who gained and lost a fortune in the Oklahoma oil fields.
- The Miller Brothers - Joseph, George and Zack - who inherited the famous 101 Ranch from parents G.W. and Molly Miller, who encouraged their children to go big or go home.
- Lew Wentz - oil tycoon and philanthropist

== See also ==
- National Register of Historic Places listings in Kay County, Oklahoma
