= Newkirk, Oklahoma =

- City
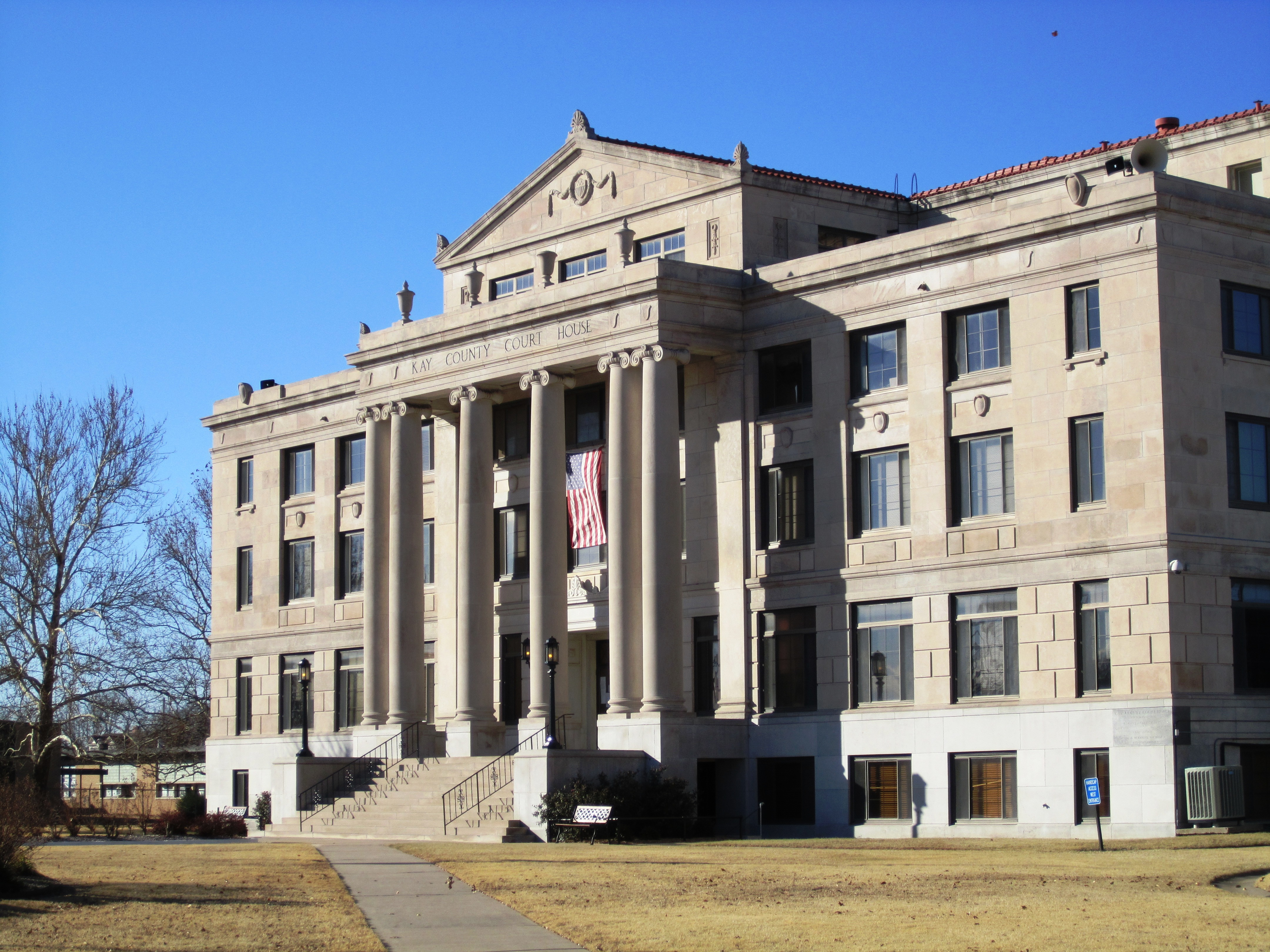
- Kay County Courthouse (2010)

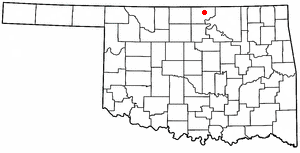
- Location of Newkirk within Oklahoma
- Coordinates: 36°52′54″N 97°03′20″W
- Country: United States
- State: Oklahoma
- County: Kay

Government
  - Type: Council-manager

Area
  - Total: 1.36 sq mi (3.51 km^{2})
  - Land: 1.36 sq mi (3.51 km^{2})
  - Water: 0 sq mi (0.00 km^{2})
- Elevation: 1,152 ft (351 m)

Population (2020)
  - Total: 2,172
  - Density: 1,603.4/sq mi (619.09/km^{2})
- Time zone: UTC-6 (Central (CST))
  - Summer (DST): UTC-5 (CDT)
- ZIP code: 74647
- Area code: 580
- FIPS code: 40-51300
- GNIS feature ID: 2411246
- Website: www.cityofnewkirkok.gov

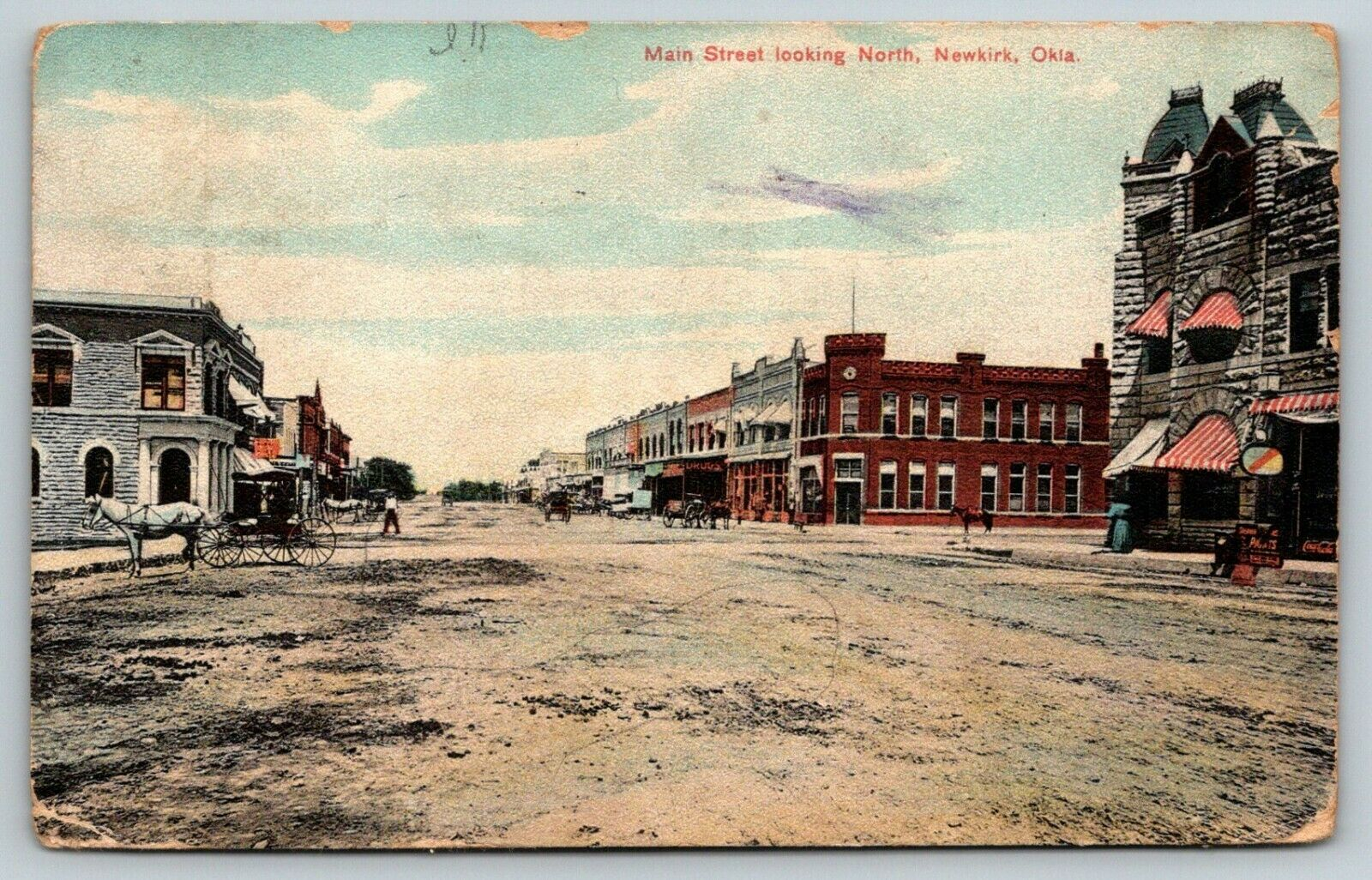
Main street looking north, Newkirk, Oklahoma (1907)

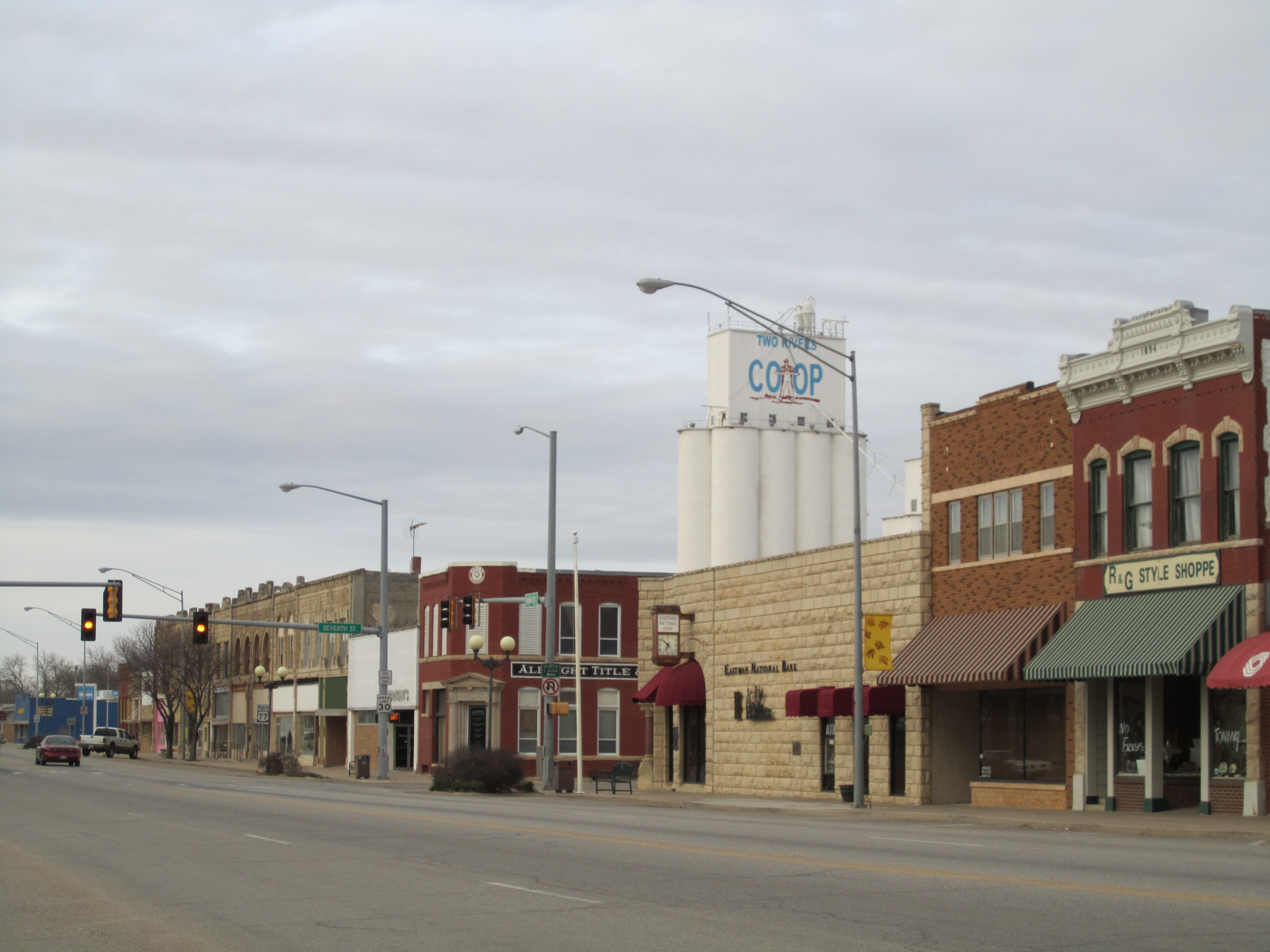
Main Street looking north with grain elevator in background (2011)

Newkirk is a city in and the county seat of Kay County, Oklahoma, United States. The population was 2,172 at the 2020 census.

== History ==
Newkirk is on land known as the Cherokee Outlet (popularly called the "Cherokee Strip"), which belonged to the Cherokee Indians until 1893. The Cherokee acquiesced to the demand of the president and Department of the Interior to sell the land, then part of Oklahoma Territory, to the U.S. government. Efforts to buy the land from the Cherokee began in 1889, but were not concluded until 1893 when Congress authorized the purchase and the land was opened to non-Indian settlement by means of the Cherokee Strip Land Run on September 16, 1893. An estimated 100,000 people raced to claim plots of land.

The town of Newkirk had been laid out before the run by the government as the county seat of “K” county. It was named Lamoreaux after Silas W. Lamoreaux, who was commissioner of the General Land Office. Two miles north of Lamoreaux was Kirk, a Santa Fe Railroad cattle-shipping station.

That first day of the land run, 5,000 people staked claims in and near Lamoreaux. Claimants were allowed two town lots: one for a home and one for a business. In designated rural areas, claimants could select 160 acres. The population quickly dropped to about 2,100 as disappointed land seekers left. A town government was organized and among the first items of business was to change the name of the town from Lamoreaux to Santa Fe, but the railroad rejected the name as several other places were named Santa Fe. Meanwhile, the railroad station at Kirk had been closed, so the name Newkirk was chosen on November 8, 1893.

In 1901, Newkirk suffered a major reversal when nearly a whole block of its thriving downtown burned. The wooden buildings that burned were mostly replaced with stone buildings from the distinctive yellow limestone quarried four miles east of Newkirk. "Imposing stone buildings began to give dignity and permanence to the dusty streets, while wood-frame homes gradually replaced the 'proving-up' homes of the Run. Young Elms, Cottonwoods, shrubs, and flowers began to change the once treeless prairies into shaded garden spots." Newkirk's business district was placed on the National Register as a historic district in 1984.

After Oklahoma became a state in 1907, Newkirk, Blackwell, and Ponca City vied to become the county seat. An election on September 3, 1908, gave Blackwell 2,038 votes, Newkirk 2,063, and Ponca City 1,388. Governor Haskell declared Newkirk the winner. Blackwell sued, but lost, and Newkirk retained the title. The present Kay County courthouse was built in 1926, replacing the original 1894 wooden structure that had burned.

In 1992, Newkirk became the first small town to receive the Oklahoma Main Street Award. Newkirk was also the name of the town in the movie Twister's drive-in movie scene, though it was filmed in Guthrie, Oklahoma.

The Kay County Courthouse in Newkirk was constructed in 1925 -1926, and at almost 100 years of age the original courthouse had many problems that were addressed by a new annex announced by the Kay County Board of Commissioners in 2020. Some of those problems included a leaking roof, electrical and plumbing problems, as well as a lack of space for the district court system. To expand the court system, all other county offices were relocated to the Annex, leaving the Courthouse only for the court system.

== Geography ==
According to the United States Census Bureau, the city has an area of 1.3 square miles (3.4 km^{2}), all land.

Newkirk is on mostly flat terrain with no large watercourses nearby, and at the boundary between two ecoregions: the Central Great Plains and the Flint Hills. West of the town on the Great Plains, the countryside is rich agricultural land, especially for wheat, soybeans, and cattle. East of town, the Flint Hills' terrain is more rugged and rocky and is primarily used for cattle ranching. Natural vegetation is mostly prairie, but stream valleys often have forests of cottonwood, oak, elm, ash, pecan, sycamore, and other species. Scrub oak and red cedar dot hillsides. Wildlife is abundant, including whitetail deer, turkey, bobwhite quail, coyote, bobcat, and waterfowl. A cougar attack on a person seven miles (11 km) east of Newkirk was reported in 2002.

Newkirk lies 8 miles (13 km) south of the Kansas-Oklahoma border. A casino and other facilities owned by the Kaw Indian tribe are 1 mile (1.6 km) east. The Arkansas River is 6 miles (9.7 km) east of town. The bridge across the river crosses the upper end of Kaw Lake. Near the river are the Deer Creek/Bryson Paddock sites, where archeologists excavated the ruins of two prominent 18th-century Wichita Indian villages. Beyond the river, continuing east, is the lightly populated, tallgrass prairie region with many large ranches. Locals call this region “The Osage” after Osage County and the Osage Indians. The Washunga cemetery of the Kaw Indians is 2 miles (3.2 km) north of Newkirk. It was moved there to avoid having it covered by water when a dam created Kaw Lake. The Chilocco Indian Agricultural School, now closed, was 7 miles (11 km) north.

=== Climate ===
Newkirk's climate can be described as extreme continental, with an average low temperature in January of 20 °F (-7 °C) and an average high temperature in July of 92 °F (33 °C). Winter temperatures sometimes fall below zero (-18 °C) and 100 °F (38 °C) days are common in summer. Average precipitation is 37 in (94 cm) per year, but highly variable. May and June are on average the wettest months and December, January, and February the driest. Tornadoes are common in the region, but Newkirk has never suffered major damage.

== Demographics ==
Historical population
Census	Pop.	Note	%±
1900	1,754		—
1910	1,992		13.6%
1920	2,533		27.2%
1930	2,135		−15.7%
1940	2,283		6.9%
1950	2,201		−3.6%
1960	2,092		−5.0%
1970	2,173		3.9%
1980	2,413		11.0%
1990	2,168		−10.2%
2000	2,243		3.5%
2010	2,317		3.3%
2020	2,172		−6.3%
U.S. Decennial Census

=== 2020 census ===
As of the 2020 census, Newkirk had a population of 2,172. The median age was 37.4 years. 24.3% of residents were under the age of 18 and 19.6% of residents were 65 years of age or older. For every 100 females there were 102.4 males, and for every 100 females age 18 and over there were 102.8 males age 18 and over.

0% of residents lived in urban areas, while 100.0% lived in rural areas.

There were 817 households in Newkirk, of which 32.9% had children under the age of 18 living in them. Of all households, 42.7% were married-couple households, 19.3% were households with a male householder and no spouse or partner present, and 31.6% were households with a female householder and no spouse or partner present. About 32.8% of all households were made up of individuals and 16.9% had someone living alone who was 65 years of age or older.

There were 1,011 housing units, of which 19.2% were vacant. Among occupied housing units, 68.2% were owner-occupied and 31.8% were renter-occupied. The homeowner vacancy rate was 1.8% and the rental vacancy rate was 12.7%.

Racial composition as of the 2020 census
Race	Percent
White	73.3%
Black or African American	1.4%
American Indian and Alaska Native	13.5%
Asian	0.5%
Native Hawaiian and Other Pacific Islander	<0.1%
Some other race	1.0%
Two or more races	10.3%
Hispanic or Latino (of any race)	3.8%

=== 2000 census ===
As of the census of 2000, 2,243 people, 928 households, and 607 families resided in the city. The population density was 1,728.5 inhabitants per square mile (667.4/km^{2}). The 1,024 housing units averaged 789.1 per square mile (304.1/km^{2}). The racial makeup of the city was 83.73% White, 1.20% African American, 8.69% Native American, 0.13% Asian, 0.85% from other races, and 5.39% from two or more races. Hispanics or Latinos of any race were 2.10% of the population.

Of the 928 households, 30.1% had children under the age of 18 living with them, 50.3% were married couples living together, 11.7% had a female householder with no husband present, and 34.5% were not families. About 31.4% of all households were made up of individuals, and 16.6% had someone living alone who was 65 years of age or older. The average household size was 2.35 and the average family size was 2.94.

In the city, the population was distributed as 25.0% under the age of 18, 9.0% from 18 to 24, 24.5% from 25 to 44, 23.8% from 45 to 64, and 17.8% who were 65 years of age or older. The median age was 39 years. For every 100 females, there were 98.7 males. For every 100 females age 18 and over, there were 92.0 males.

The median income for a household in the city was $27,941, and for a family was $38,125. Males had a median income of $28,984 versus $19,315 for females. The per capita income for the city was $14,971. About 11.0% of families and 16.4% of the population were below the poverty line, including 25.1% of those under age 18 and 10.5% of those age 65 or over.

== Economy ==
The local economy is primarily based on agriculture.

== Government ==
Newkirk has a council-manager form of government.

== Notable people ==
- Nelson T. Johnson was born in Washington, D.C., but spent much of his childhood in Newkirk. He was United States ambassador to the Republic of China from 1935 to 1941 and Australia from 1941 to 1945.
- Richard E. Killblane, author and military historian, attended school in Newkirk from 1962 to 1969.

== See also ==
- National Register of Historic Places listings in Kay County, Oklahoma
