= Northern Oklahoma College =

Community college in Tonkawa, Oklahoma, US

Coordinates: 36°40′42″N 97°17′51″W

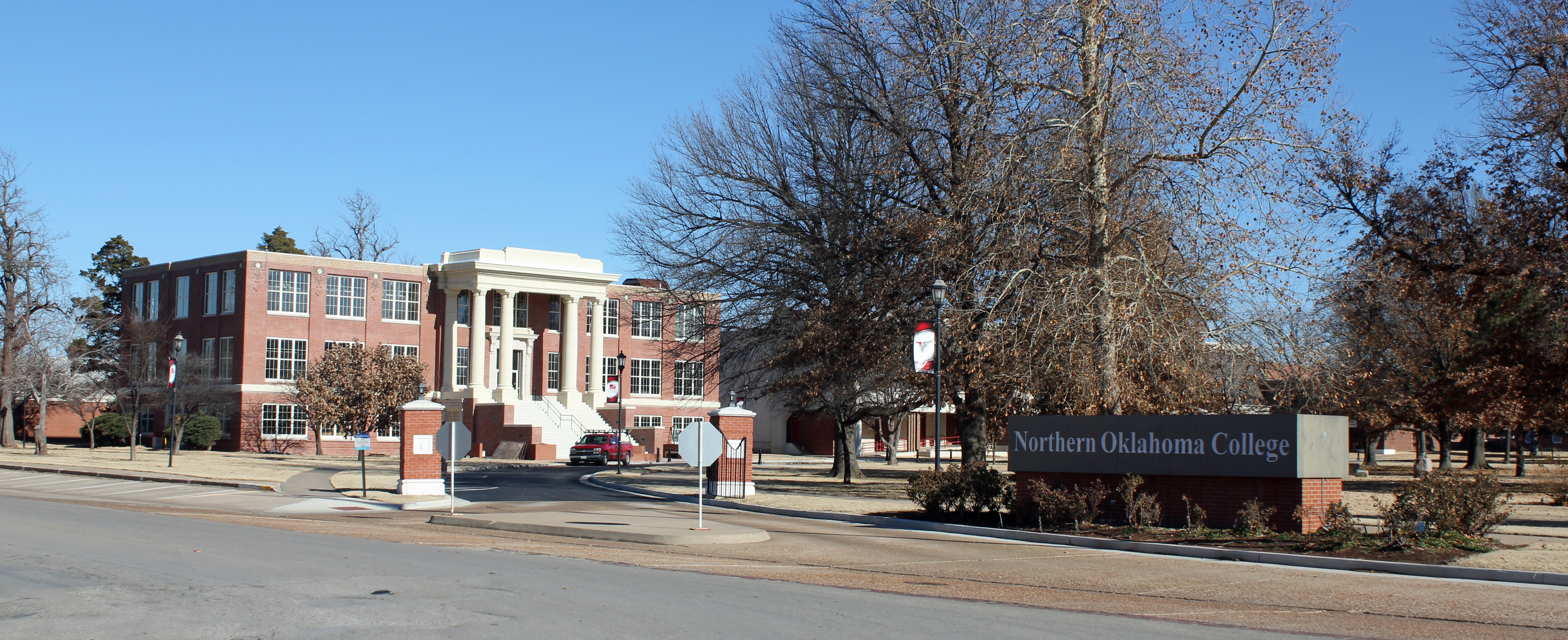
- The Tonkawa campus in late 2013
- Motto: "Life changing."
- Type: Public community college
- Established: 1901
- President: Clark Harris
- Undergraduates: 3,083 (fall 2023)
- Location: Tonkawa, Oklahoma, United States
- Mascots: NOC Tonkawa - Mavericks; NOC Enid - Jets
- Website: www.noc.edu

Northern Oklahoma College (NOC) is a public community college in Tonkawa, Oklahoma, with additional campuses located in Enid, Oklahoma and Stillwater, Oklahoma. Student enrollment is approximately 3,100 as of fall 2023. NOC bought the former Phillips University in Enid, Oklahoma, in 1999 and it became the NOC Enid campus.

== History ==
The history of Northern Oklahoma College began in 1901 when the Honorable James Wilkin realized the need for a college in the Tonkawa, Oklahoma area. Thus, the sixth Territorial Legislature passed an appropriation bill on March 1, 1901, for the establishment of the University Preparatory School at Tonkawa. The doors opened in 1902 to 217 students and 7 faculty. It was the sixth state school. From 1913 to 1915, it was known as the Oklahoma Institute of Technology.

The school closed during World War I from 1917 to 1919, when Governor Robert L. Williams vetoed the appropriation bill for the biennium. It reopened September 2, 1919, after Gov. James B. A. Robertson signed an appropriation bill for its reestablishment. College-level courses were added in 1921, the college was named Northern Oklahoma Junior College in 1941, and the high school curriculum was phased out by 1951. The school was renamed Northern Oklahoma College in 1965.

During the first two decades, the school served primarily as a "feeder" institution for the University of Oklahoma and paralleled the university curriculum of music, foreign languages, business, literature, and military science. In addition, the school served as a cultural center for the performing arts, a distinction that continues today with the 2006 dedication of the Kinzer Performing Arts Center.

The school's first accreditation by the North Central Association of Colleges and Universities was in 1948. With the passage of the Higher Education Code in 1965, the institution received its present name, Northern Oklahoma College, and the three-person Board of Regents was expanded to five members. Edwin E. Vineyard became the tenth president; he served for twenty-five years and retired as the college's president holding the longest tenure. During his administration the campus underwent an expansive building program. Joe M. Kinzer became president in 1990 upon the retirement of Vineyard. New campuses have opened in Enid (1999) and Stillwater (2003), further expanding the programs and enrollment of Northern.

Northern is a leader among Oklahoma colleges in technological advances in developing multiple on-line and interactive television courses that serve students in rural and remote areas who could not otherwise attain a college degree. NOC is nationally recognized by the Aspen Institute in Washington DC as being in the top 10 percent of community colleges in the country.

Cheryl Evans was named president in 2011.

On April 26, 2021, the Northern Oklahoma College Board of Regents announced the selection of Clark Harris as the new President of Northern Oklahoma College and he began his tenure on July 1 of that year. Harris had previously spent more than 30 years as an educator at several universities and high schools nationwide including Kansas State University and Laramie County Community College. As a way to drive NOC enrollment Harris suggested focusing on technology and promoting individual programs that would attract potential students wanting their associate degree.

== Locations ==
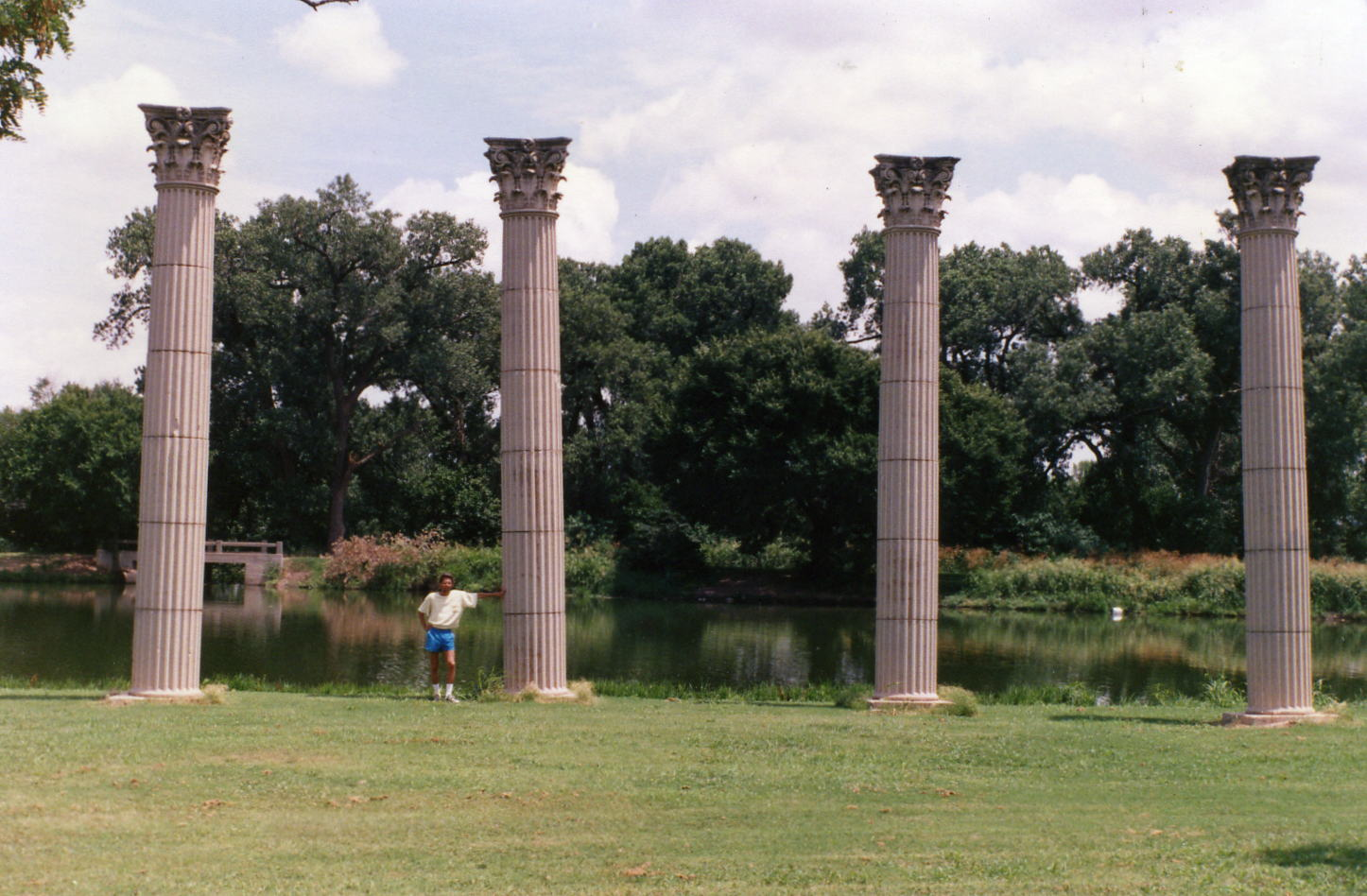
Sunken Gardens at the Enid campus of Northern Oklahoma College

=== Tonkawa ===
The Tonkawa campus, established in 1901, serves as administrative center for Northern with campuses in Tonkawa, Enid, and Stillwater. All program oversight in academic, financial, student service, personnel, development, physical plant, and information technology is housed in Tonkawa. Some 2,200 students attend class on campus, by ITV, via online, or at technology centers. The Tonkawa campus is the home of the Eleanor Hays Art Gallery, which hosts exhibits by Oklahoma artists throughout the academic year, located in the lobby of the 500-seat Kinzer Performing Arts Center, dedicated in 2006. It is also home to radio station KAYE-FM, the A. D. Buck Museum of Science and History, and the North Oklahoma Botanical Garden and Arboretum. In 2021 Northern Oklahoma College partnered with Pickens Museum partnered to display works of art at NOC's Tonkawa campus including a 20 foot by 60 foot mural by Osage Artist Yatika Starr Fields. Pickens Museum has displayed exhibitions on the Tonkawa campus by Donald De Lue, Robert Hardee, C. J. Wells, and Malvina Hoffman.

=== Enid ===
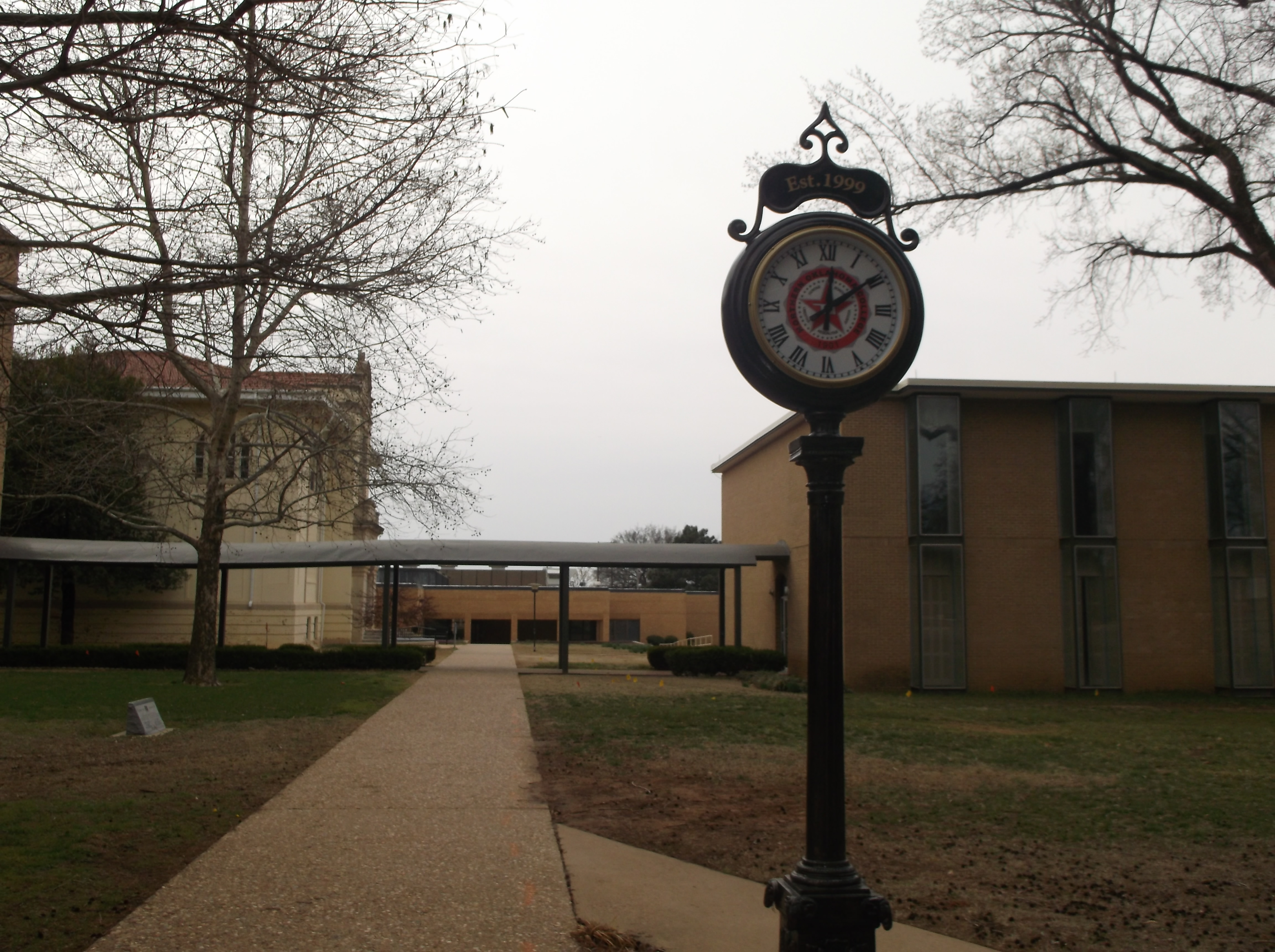
Enid Campus

The Enid campus was established in 1999 in conjunction with the Oklahoma State Regents for Higher Education (OSRHE) and the City of Enid. The facility had been the home of Phillips University, which had gone bankrupt in 1998. The Phillips University campus was founded in 1906. Since its purchase by NOC in 1999, this campus has grown in offering multiple two-year liberal arts degree programs to some 1,200 students each semester. Among the more popular degrees offered are Nursing, Business Administration, Education, Social Science, and Pre-Medicine. The College also has numerous cooperative degree programs in medical and electronic areas with Autry Technology Center the local career technology center. Northern Oklahoma College brings a complete college experience to Enid with varsity athletics, dorms, cultural events and more. The Enid campus continues to expand its faculty, curriculum, and clubs and activities to meet the needs of people in northwest Oklahoma.

=== Stillwater ===
The Stillwater campus, established in 2003, serves multiple missions to area students. Primarily a Gateway Program, the Stillwater campus serves students who would otherwise not be admitted to Oklahoma State University. The campus, however, also admits students seeking general education courses that transfer to other comprehensive colleges and universities. Northern Stillwater admits approximately 300 new Students each fall and spring semester, serving some 1,700 students.

== Athletics ==
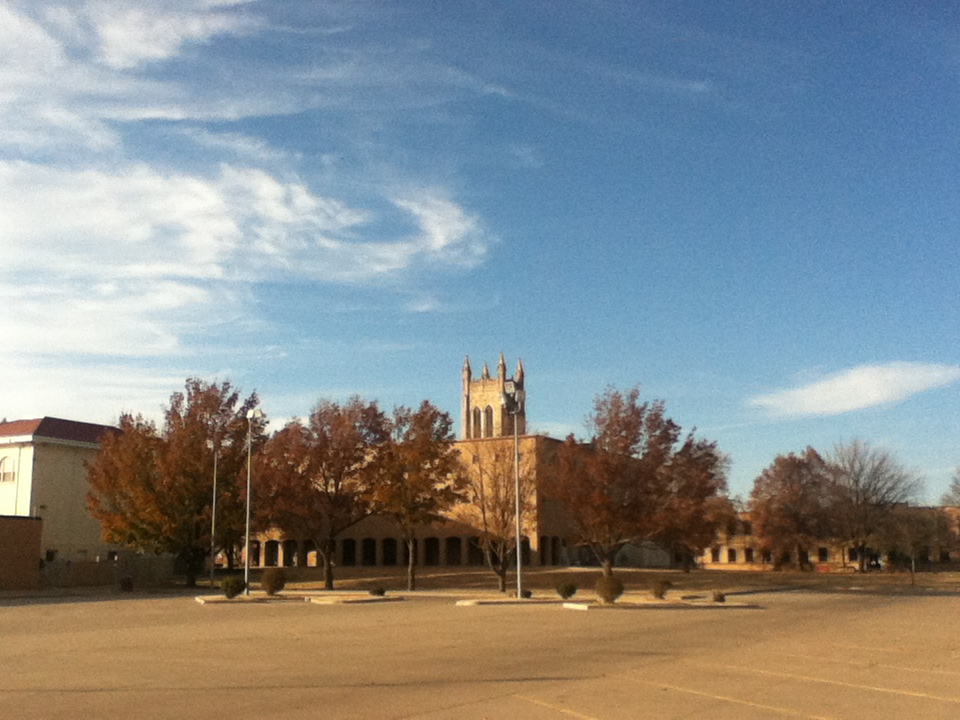
A view of the NOC Enid Campus

=== Tonkawa Mavericks ===
The Tonkawa campus has men's and women's basketball, men's and women's soccer, baseball, softball and cheerleading teams. Northern Oklahoma College won the 1979 NJCAA Women's Basketball Championship, 74-52 against Tyler Junior College. The professional wrestler "The Big Show" played basketball for the Mavericks in 1990-1991 before transferring to Wichita State. NBA player John Starks played basketball for the Mavericks during one semester in the 1980s. Pitcher Clint Straka was drafted into the Seattle Mariners in 2006. After NOC, he played baseball for the University of Central Oklahoma, where he was named to the Third Team 2008 National Collegiate Baseball Writers' Association Division II All-American Team.

The Donald R. Hays Basketball Scholarship is awarded to the member of the men’s varsity basketball team with the highest grade point average.

=== Enid Jets ===
The Enid Jets were established in 2001, and have had 18 championships, 21 NJCAA All-Americans, and 58 Academic All-Americans. The Jets have men's basketball, women's basketball, baseball, softball and cheerleading teams. The NOC Enid Jets baseball team won the NJCAA World Series in 2019. The Jets baseball team were conference champions in 2002, 2003, and 2005. They were Region II champions in 2002 and 2004, and runners up in 2009. They were Southwest District Champions in 2002, and also received 3rd place in the NJCAA World Series in that year. The Lady Jets basketball team were NJAAC Region II Champs 2010 and 2011.

== Notable alumni ==
- Ruth Muskrat Bronson, (1897-1982) Cherokee educator and Native American rights advocate
- Dale DeWitt, majority leader of the Oklahoma House of Representatives
- D. L. Lang, former poet laureate of Vallejo, California
- Bill McCloud, author, professor, recipient of 2018 Distinguished Alumni award
- Jamie McGuire, novelist
- Jim Reese, former member of the Oklahoma House of Representatives
- Rojay Smith, Jamaican footballer
