= Bill McCloud =

American war history author

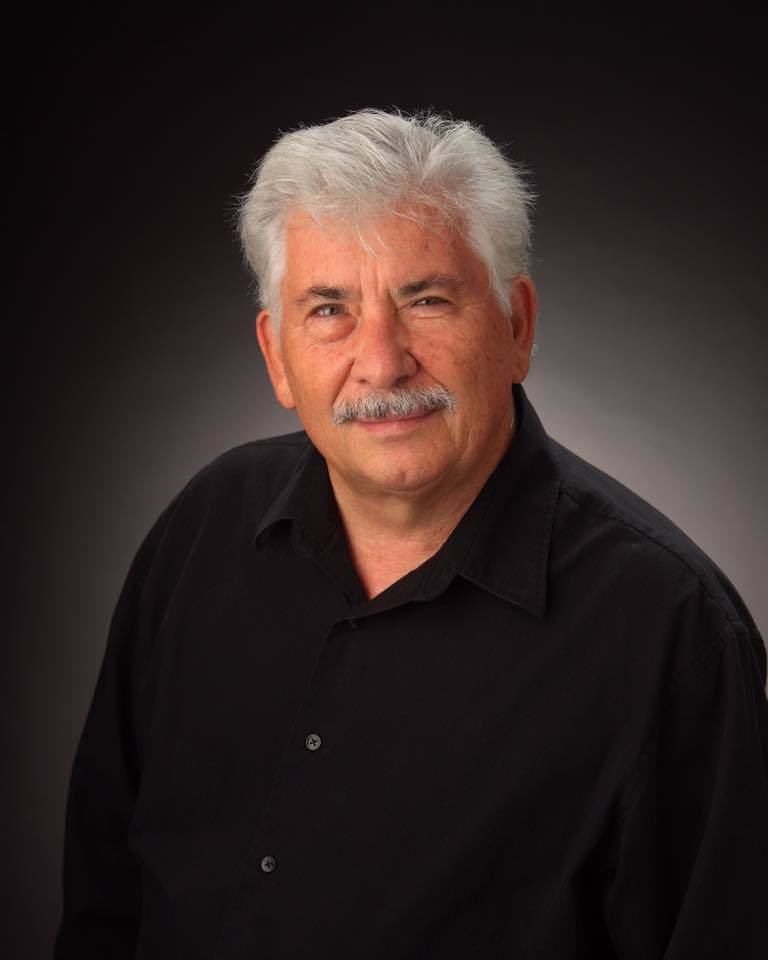
- Born: Billy Glen McCloud; October 29, 1948 (age 77); Ponca City, Oklahoma, U.S.
- Occupations: Author; Teacher
- Writing career
- Period: 1989-present
- Genres: History; Memoir
- Notable works: What Should We Tell Our Children About Vietnam? Smell of the Light: Vietnam 1968-1969
- Military career
- Branch: United States Army
- Service years: 1967-1970
- Rank: E5
- Unit: 147th Assault Support Helicopter Company (Hillclimbers)

Billy Glen McCloud (/mʌklˈaʊd/; born October 29, 1948) is an American adjunct professor of American History at Rogers State University. He has written two books, What Should We Tell Our Children About Vietnam? and a book of poems, The Smell of the Light: Vietnam, 1968-1969.

== Early life and career ==
In 1987 McCloud prepared to teach his junior high-school history class about the Vietnam War, but found history textbooks to have brief and superficial sections to cover the conflict. He then wrote letters to more than 200 persons, asking them to respond to the question: What are the most important things for today's students to understand about the Vietnam War? In 1988 American Heritage included several replies he had received in their Volume 39, Issue 4 magazine, bringing his work to national attention. He received 160 replies in total, and in October 1989 the University of Oklahoma Press published his book What Should We Tell Our Children About Vietnam? that include 128 of those responses received. In 2009 Harvard University's Houghton Library purchased the archive McCloud accumulated while creating this book.

Since April 2019, he has contributed fiction and poetry book reviews to The VVA Veteran magazine's online Books in Review II page.

He holds degrees from Northern Oklahoma College, Oklahoma State University and Northeastern State University. Northern Oklahoma College inducted McCloud into their Distinguished Alumni Hall of Fame in 2018.

== Military career ==
McCloud served in the U.S. Army from 1967 to 1970 during the Vietnam War. He was in Vietnam from March 1968 to March 1969 as flight operations coordinator for the 147th Assault Support Helicopter Company (Hillclimbers). He received the Air Medal for flying in 50 helicopter missions.

During his time in Vietnam, McCloud wrote a series of letters to his mother. After arriving in the country, he had gone a month without writing home, when a first sergeant instructed him to have a letter ready to go every Monday. 52 of these letters were saved by his mother and later became the basis for a series of poems that would be collected into his book The Smell of the Light: Vietnam, 1968-1969.

== Awards ==
- USA Today's "People Who Make A Difference." (1988)
- George Washington Honor Medal for Excellence in Public Communications from Freedoms Foundation at Valley Forge (1998)
- Vietnam Veterans of America's Excellence in the Arts Award (2024)

== Bibliography ==
A complete listing of works by Bill McCloud:

- What Should We Tell Our Children About Vietnam? (1989)
- The Smell of the Light: Vietnam, 1968-1969 (2017)
- The Error of the Stars: The Poetry of Bill McCloud (2024)
