= Poncan Theatre =

- U.S. National Register of Historic Places
- U.S. Historic district – Contributing property
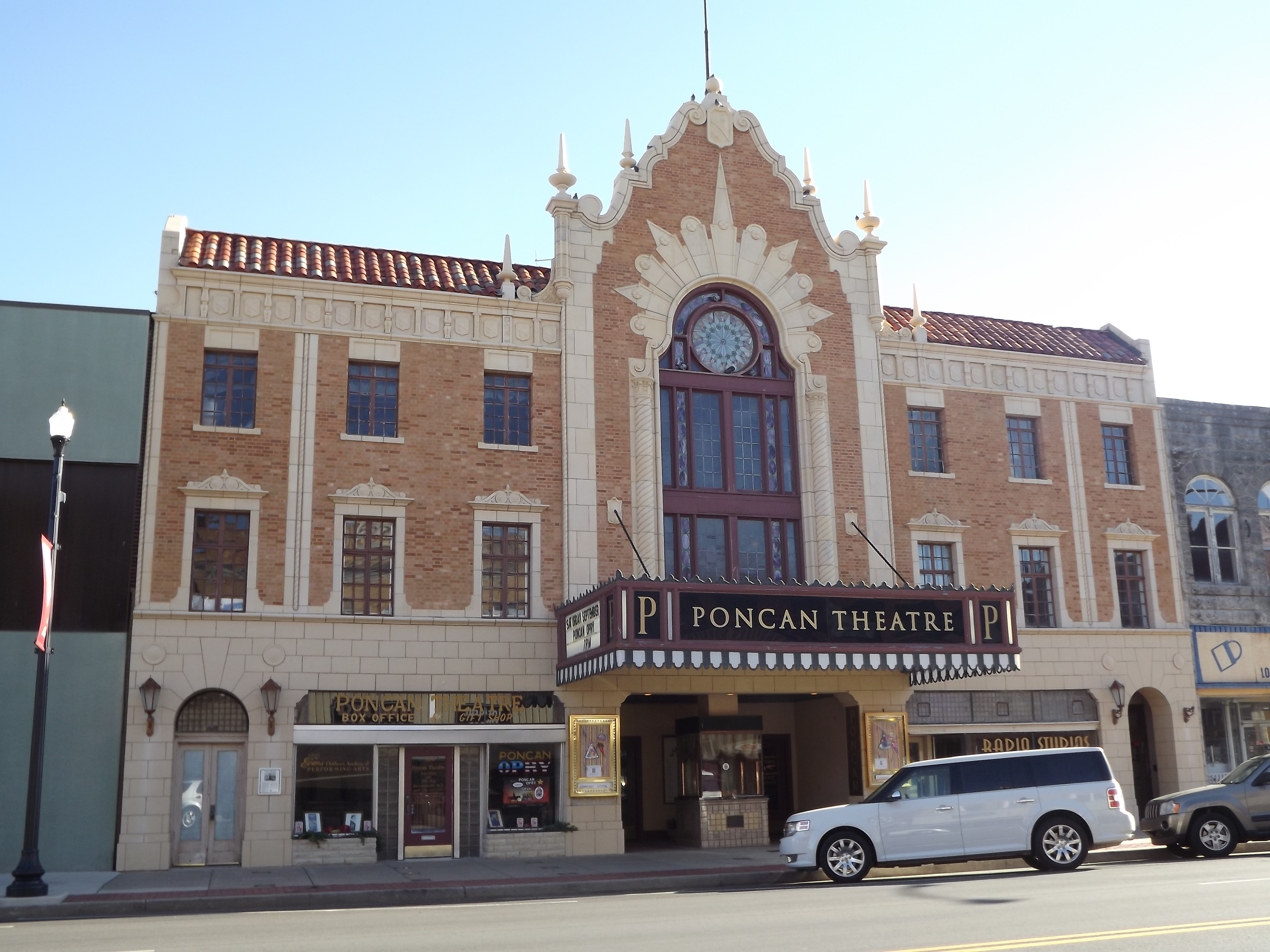
- Theater in 2012

- Location within Oklahoma Location within the United States
- Location: 104 E. Grand Ave. Ponca City, Oklahoma
- Coordinates: 36.7035°N 97.0834°W
- Area: less than one acre
- Built: 1927
- Architect: Boller Brothers
- Architectural style: Spanish Colonial Revival
- Part of: Downtown Ponca City Historic District (ID10001010)
- NRHP reference No.: 84000455
- Added to NRHP: November 13, 1984

The Poncan Theatre is a historic theater in Ponca City, Oklahoma. It is individually listed on the National Register of Historic Places, and is a contributing property of the Downtown Ponca City Historic District.

== History ==
The Poncan Theatre was designed by the Boller Brothers and opened on September 20, 1927. The building and its equipment cost $280,000, and it housed a $22,500 Wurlitzer pipe organ. The building served as a combination vaudeville–movie theater from its opening until the late 1940s when the vaudeville component was discontinued.

In 1939, the marquee was replaced with a neon-lit one. In 1954, the marquee was enlarged, obscuring much of the theater's second floor, and was enlarged again in 1962. In 1985, the theater closed; in 1990, the Poncan Theatre Company was founded to revive it. The building was renovated, which included the removal of the marquee in 1992 and replacement with one matching the 1927 original. The theater reopened on September 18, 1994.

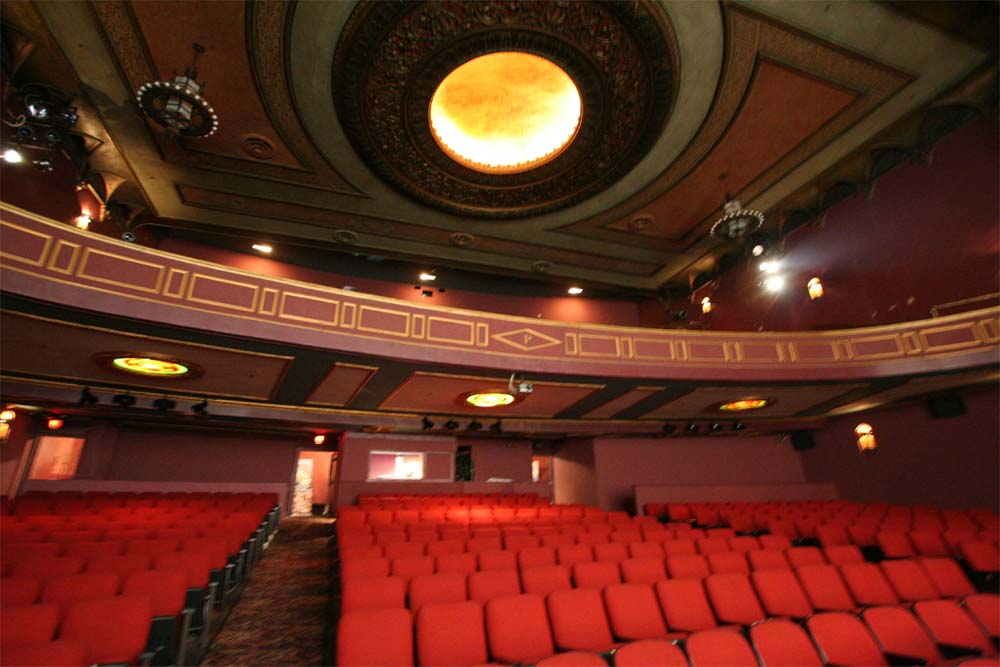
Theater auditorium showing the balcony circa 2007

The theater was added to the National Register of Historic Places on November 13, 1984. It was nominated for its local significance as the finest example of Spanish Colonial Revival architecture in Ponca City and its role as an entertainment venue. In 2001, additional documentation on the theater was submitted, revealing that the theater was designed by the Boller Brothers, not John Duncan Forsyth as originally identified in the 1984 nomination. In 2011, the theater was designated a contributing property of the newly listed Downtown Ponca City Historic District. At the time, the Poncan Theatre was the only site in the district previously listed on the National Register.

== Architecture ==
The north-facing theater is a three-story building that extends 75 feet (23 m) wide. The first floor has a stone facade, while the upper floors are clad in polychrome brick. The facade features a large, central curvilinear gable parapet rimmed with terra cotta ornamentation and five finials. The midline of the gable features a two-story rectangular window with stained glass sidelights, topped by a circular stained glass oculus window highlighted by a terra cotta sunburst. The central window is rimmed by spiralled Corinthian columns and flanked by three rectangular windows on both sides on the second and third stories. Above is a terra cotta cornice supporting a red-tiled hip roof. The central entrance is recessed behind the box office, and on either side is a shallow store front.

== See also ==
- National Register of Historic Places listings in Kay County, Oklahoma
