= City Hall in Ponca City =

Coordinates: 36.703°N 97.078°W

City Hall in Ponca City is a historic Spanish Colonial architecture city hall building and auditorium in Ponca City, Oklahoma. It was designed by Solomon Layton's firm, the designers of the Oklahoma State Capitol and many other significant buildings in the state. Originally built as an auditorium in 1916, the east and west wings were added in 1922.

The Centennial Monument by Jo Saylors is in front of the building, one of three monuments in Centennial Plaza commemorating early oil rush developer tycoons and philanthropists who helped build the city.

The City Hall building is part of the Downtown Ponca City Historic District where it is noted as the "Ponca City Municipal Complex".

It is a contributing building in the Downtown Ponca City Historic District, which was listed on the National Register of Historic Places in 2011.

The city hall was restored during 2001–2003. It is located at 500 East Grand.
