= First Presbyterian Church of Tonkawa =

Historic church in Oklahoma, United States

- U.S. National Register of Historic Places
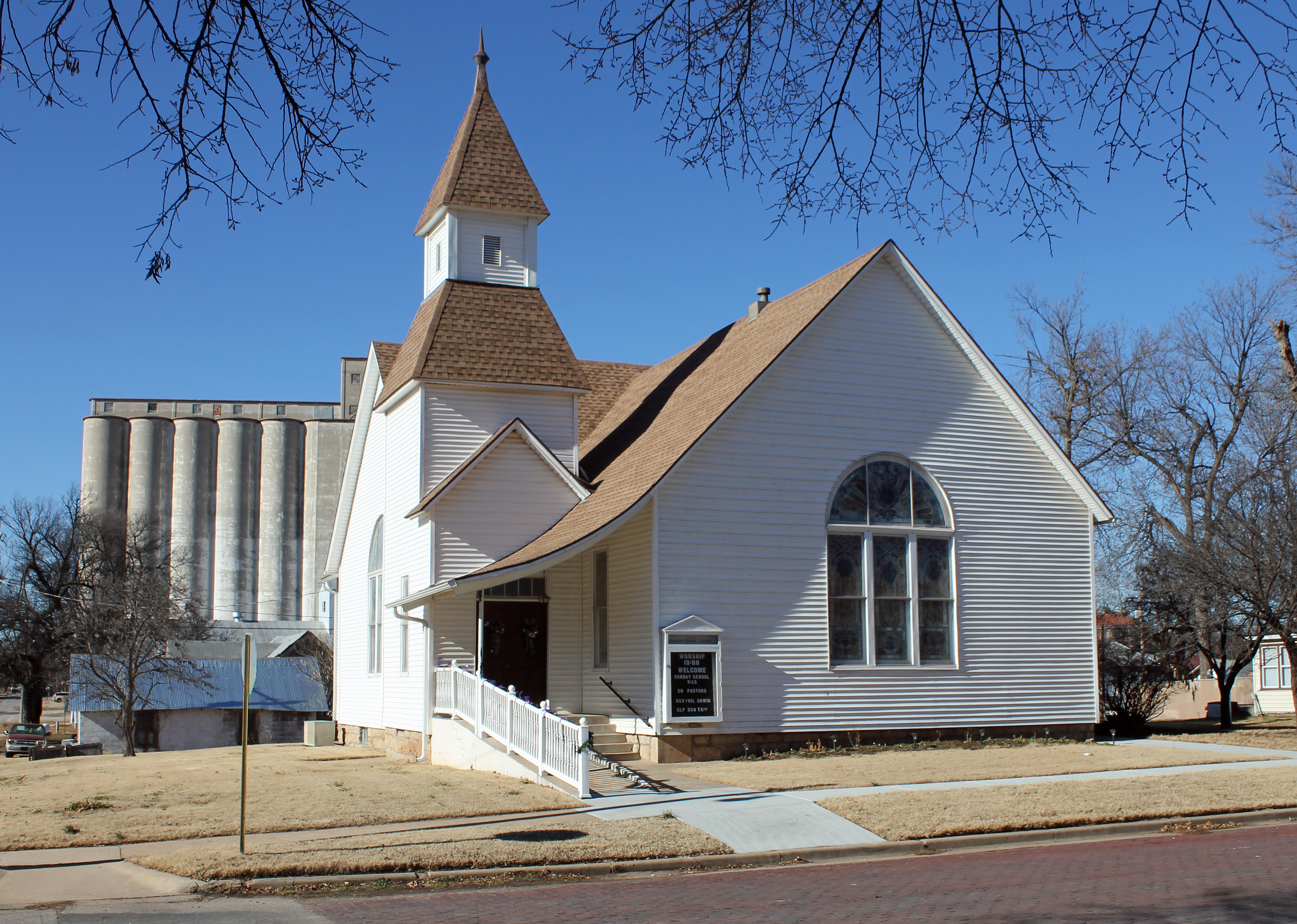
- The church in late 2013.

- Location within Oklahoma Location within the United States
- Location: 109 S. 4th St., Tonkawa, Oklahoma
- Coordinates: 36°40′43″N 97°18′18″W
- Area: less than one acre
- Built: 1905
- Built by: J.M. Schwab
- Architectural style: Side-steeple church
- NRHP reference No.: 94001081
- Added to NRHP: September 22, 1994

The First Presbyterian Church of Tonkawa is a historic church in Tonkawa, Oklahoma. It was built in 1905. It was added to the National Register of Historic Places listings in Kay County, Oklahoma in 1994.

It is a side-steeple church.
