= A. D. Buck Museum of Science and History =

Museum in Tonkawa, Oklahoma, US

- Established: 1913
- Coordinates: 36°40′50.88″N 97°17′46.32″W
- Type: 1220 E. Grand Tonkawa, Oklahoma
- Founder: C. E. Johnson
- Curator: Rex D. Ackerson
- Website: http://www.noc.edu/a-d-buck-museum

A. D Buck Museum of Science and History is a museum in Tonkawa, Oklahoma, located on the campus of Northern Oklahoma College (NOC).

== History ==
One of the oldest college-connected museums in Oklahoma, this was originally named the Yellow Bull Museum after a Nez Perce chief, the museum was renamed in 1966 to honor its long-time director, A.D. Buck, who served from the 1930s until 1966. It was founded in 1913 by C. E. Johnson who was a biology instructor at the college. Johnson's taxidermy course led to many of the early specimens in the museum. The museum was originally housed in Wilkin Hall before the building burnt down in 1914. The museum remained in North Hall (a.k.a. Harold Hall) until 1968, when it was given its own building.

The museum has had only four directors in its history: C. E. Johnson, A. D. Buck, Leo Rodriguez, and Rex Ackerson.

== Exhibits ==
The museum features the history of: Northern Oklahoma College, E.W. Marland's Three Sands Oil Field, the Tonkawa World War II Prisoner of War Camp, and William H. Vanselous' Big V Ranch. Science exhibits include mounted specimens of birds and mammals, and the Herbert Walther Mineral/Fossil Collection (housed in nearby Crowder Science Hall.)

The museum closed in 2010 for remodeling, it reopened to present the artifacts and memorabilia arranged by decade. It also added a Welcome Center for NOC' students, employees, faculty, alumni, donors and the general public.

The museum is open only by appointment.
