= Oklahoma State Highway 156 =

State highway in Oklahoma, United States

State Highway 156
- 101 Ranch Memorial Road

Route information
- Maintained by ODOT
- Length: 16.91 mi (27.21 km)
- Existed: March 1, 1965–present

Major junctions
- South end: US 77 in Marland
- North end: US 60 / US 77 / US 177 east of Ponca City

Location
- Country: United States
- State: Oklahoma

Highway system
- Oklahoma State Highway System; Interstate; US; State; Turnpikes
| ← SH-153 | → SH-162 |

State Highway 156, abbreviated SH-156, is a highway maintained by the U.S. state of Oklahoma. Spanning 16.91 miles (27.21 km) through the north-central part of the state, it connects the town of Marland, Oklahoma to US-60/US-77/US-177 in the north to US-77 in the west. It is the former alignment of US-77.

== Route description ==
Starting at US-77, the highway goes east for eight miles (13 km) until reaching Marland, where it turns northward. Nine miles (14 km) later, after crossing from Noble County into Kay County, it ends at US-60/US-77/US-177 four miles (6.4 km) west of Ponca City.

SH-156 is designated as the 101 Ranch Memorial Road. A historical marker to the ranch is located along the highway.

== History ==
The entirety of SH-156 was once part of US-77. US-77 was realigned and SH-156 was assigned to the old alignment on March 1, 1965. On July 14, 1969, US-60/US-77/US-177 was realigned at SH-156's north end, necessitating a slight extension northward. No further changes have taken place since 1969.

== Junction list ==
| County | Location | mi | km | Destinations | Notes |
|---|---|---|---|---|---|
| Noble | | 0.00 | 0.00 | US 77 | Southern terminus |
| Kay | | 16.91 | 27.21 | US 60 / US 77 / US 177 | Northern terminus |
1.000 mi = 1.609 km; 1.000 km = 0.621 mi
