= Tonkawa massacre =

Massacre of Tonkawa tribe members during the American Civil War

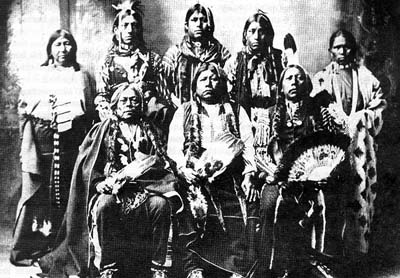
Tonkawa (1898) survivors and descendants of massacre survivors. Standing L-R, Winnie Richards, John Rush Buffalo, William Stevens, John Allen, and Mary Richards. Photograph by Frank Rinehart.

The Tonkawa massacre (October 23–24, 1862) occurred after an attack at the Confederate-held Wichita Agency, located at Fort Cobb (south of present-day Fort Cobb, Oklahoma) near Anadarko in the Indian Territories, when a detachment of irregular Union Indian troops, made up of the Tonkawa's long-hated tribal enemies, detected a weakness at Fort Cobb due to the Civil War and attacked the agency, home to 300-390 members of the Tonkawa, a tribe sympathetic to the Confederacy. During the attack on the Confederate-held agency, the Confederate Indian agent Matthew Leeper and several other whites were killed. (Note: Another source states that Leeper was not killed during this attack, but escaped unnoticed.) In response to this attack the Tonkawa fled southward toward Confederate-held Fort Arbuckle. However, before they could reach the safety of the fort they were caught on October 24. In the resulting massacre, the estimates of Tonkawa dead were 137-240 men, women and children, among them Chief Ha-shu-ka-na ("Can't Kill Him"). One account states that the Tonkawa were roasted alive by the Comanche. There are varying accounts of the tribes involved in the massacre with the Osage, Shawnee, Caddo, Delaware, Comanche, Kickapoo, Kiowa, Wichita and Seminole being named in some accounts.

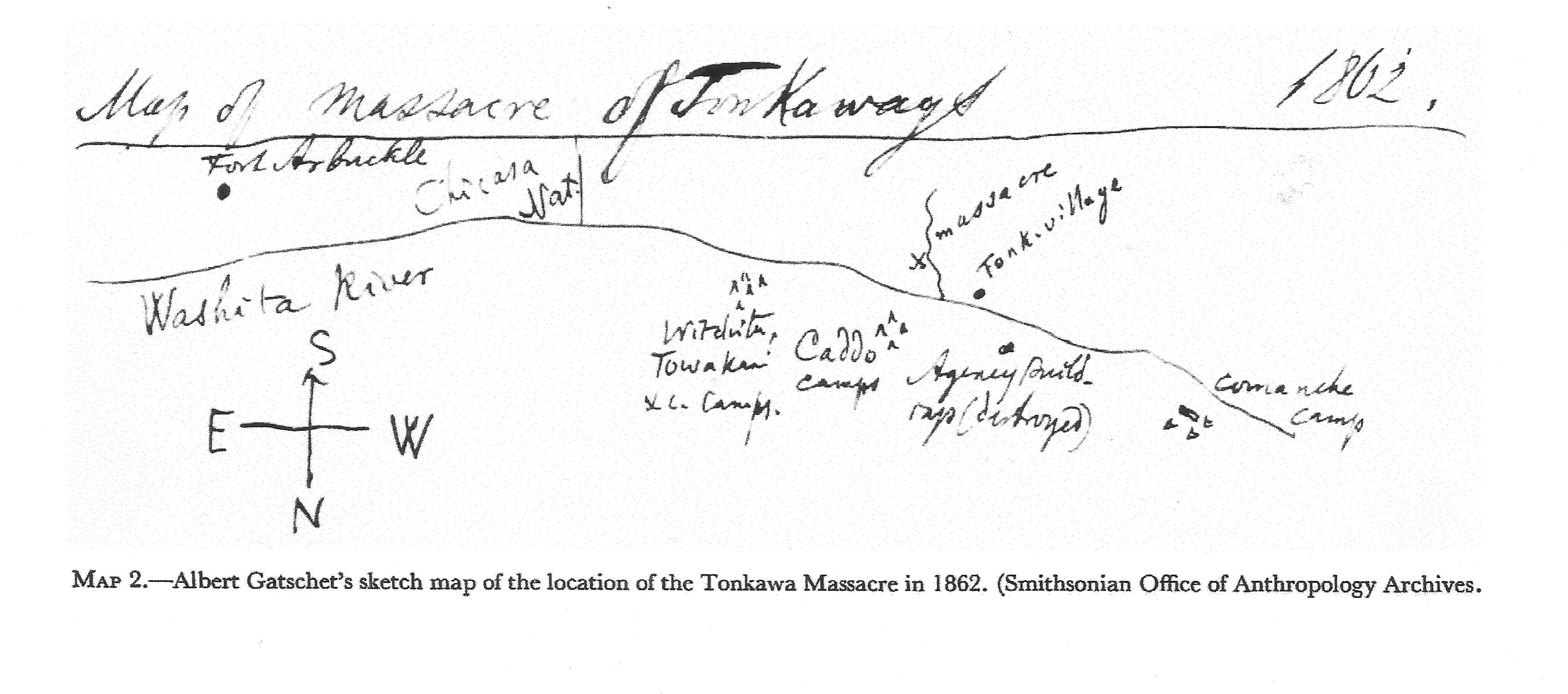
A sketch map of the location of the Tonkawa Massacre, 1862

One reason that the Tonkawa were targeted was due to rumors that the tribe participated in cannibalism. Some accounts claim that the Tonkawa had killed and eaten two Shawnees, and that they were responsible for the death and dismemberment of a young Caddo boy. Other accounts name the main reason as their being allied to the Confederacy. The relations between the Tonkawa and neighboring tribes had been antagonistic for years for a variety of reasons including the Tonkawa acting as scouts for the Texas Rangers, and fighting alongside them in actions against hostile tribes including the Comanche.

Many of the survivors fled to Confederate-held Fort Arbuckle after the massacre, base of the pro-Confederate Chickasaw Battalion, then made their way to Confederate-held Fort Belknap and Austin, Texas in 1863. The massacre completely demoralized and fractured the remnants of the tribe, who remained without a leader and lived in squalor by Fort Belknap. The remnants of the tribe then lived near Fort Griffin in Texas until 1884. They were then forced by the government to relocate temporarily to the Sac-Fox agency and then in the spring of 1885 to Fort Oakland, occupied by Chief Joseph's Band of Nez Perce from 1878 to 1885. In 1891, 73 members of the Tonkawa were allocated 994.33 acres (4.0239 km^{2}) of federal trust land, with an additional 238.24 acres (0.9641 km^{2}) in individual allotments, near the former Fort Oakland, which is today known as Tonkawa, Oklahoma, 12 miles (19 km) west of Ponca City. The population on the reservation in 2011 was 537 with 481 being officially on the tribal rolls.
