= Ponca City Milling Company Elevator =

- U.S. National Register of Historic Places
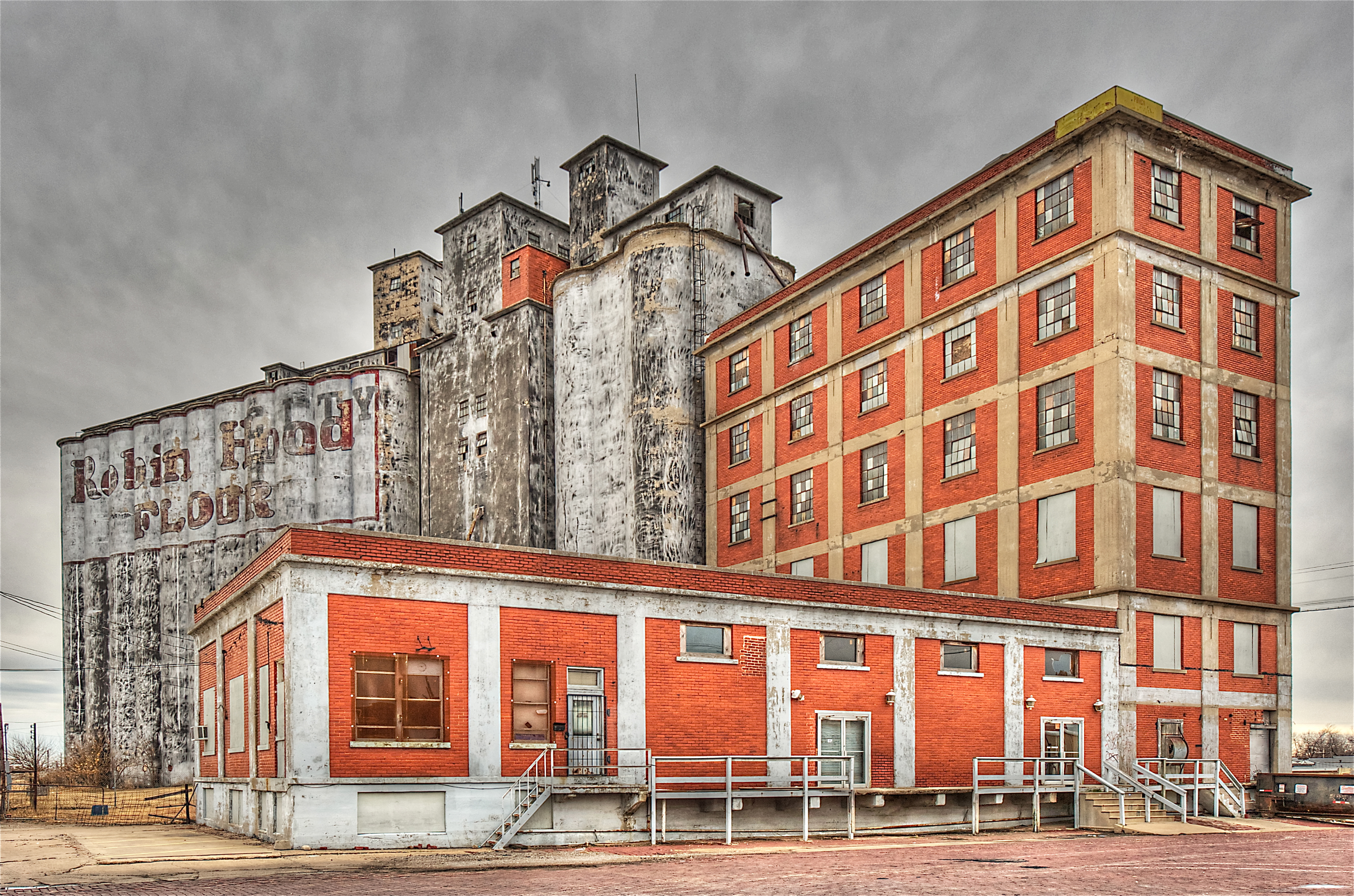
- Ponca City Milling Company Elevator

- Location within Oklahoma Location within the United States
- Nearest city: Ponca City, Oklahoma
- Coordinates: 36°42′10″N 97°05′05″W
- NRHP reference No.: 100004172
- Added to NRHP: July 15, 2019

Ponca City Milling Company Elevator, also known as the Robin Hood Elevator, is a grain elevator located at 114 West Central Avenue in Ponca City, Oklahoma. The now vacant milling complex, once owned and operated by the Donahoe family, consists of an office, flour storage area, flour mill, grain elevator, and cylindrical grain storage bins. The property was listed on the National Register of Historic Places on July 15, 2019.

Since 2018, Ponca City Main Street has led an effort for Oklahoma artist Rick Sinnett to paint murals on the east and west sides of the elevator.
