= Downtown Ponca City Historic District =

Historic district in Oklahoma, United States

- U.S. National Register of Historic Places
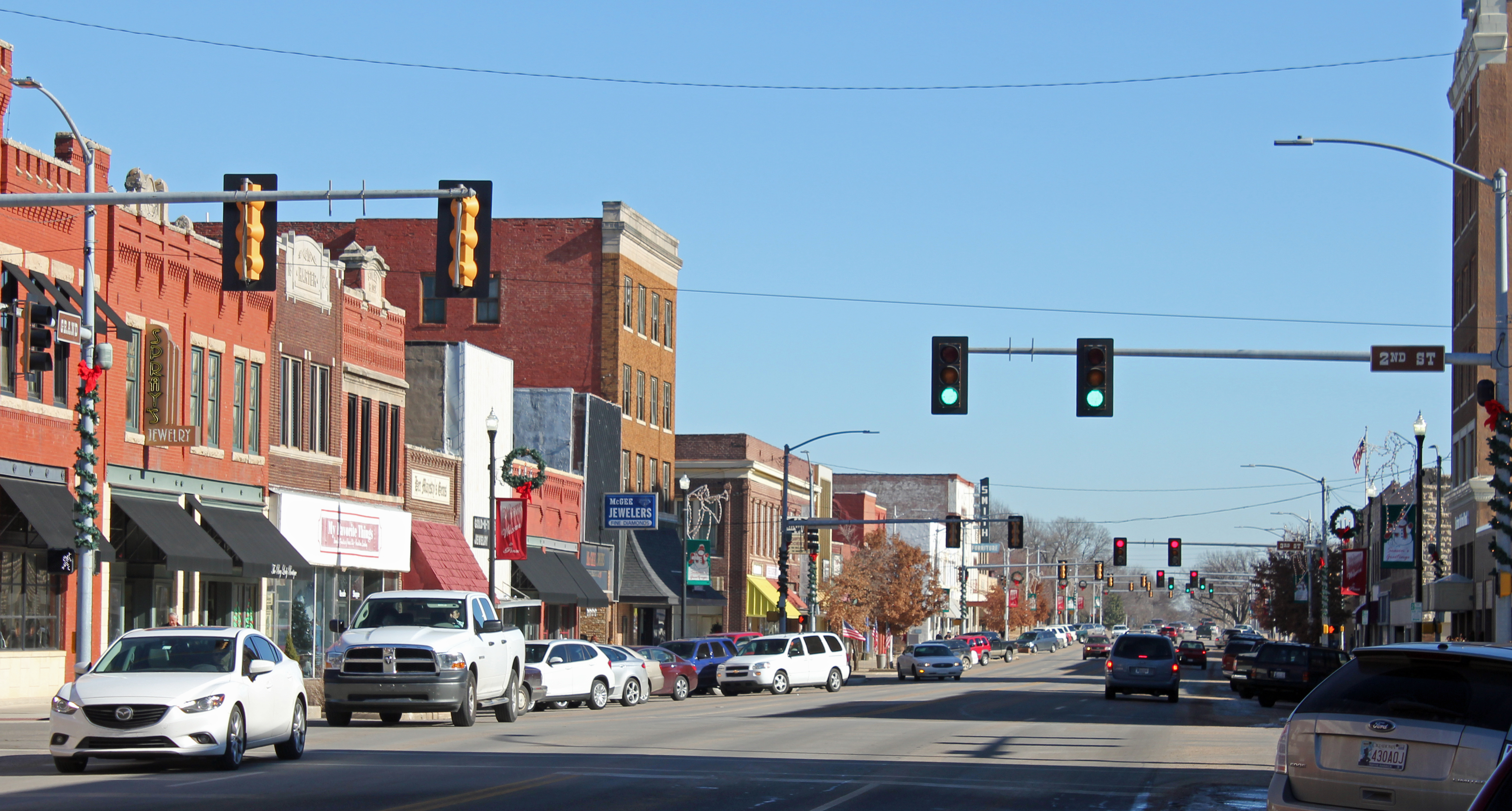
- Location: Roughly bounded by Pine, Chestnut, 7th St, and Central Ave, Ponca City, Oklahoma
- Area: 73 acres (30 ha)
- Architect: Layton, Solomon; et al.
- Architectural style: Early Commercial, Mission/spanish Revival
- NRHP reference No.: 10001010
- Added to NRHP: March 21, 2011

The Downtown Ponca City Historic District is a 73 acres (30 ha) area of historic buildings in Ponca City, Oklahoma. The historic district is listed on the National Register of Historic Places in 2011.

The listing included 109 contributing buildings and 33 non-contributing ones.

It includes the City Hall in Ponca City, Poncan Theatre, a Department Store building, Royal Theater, several commercial buildings including the newspaper building, and the Savage Motor Company Building.
