= Tonkawa, Oklahoma =

- City
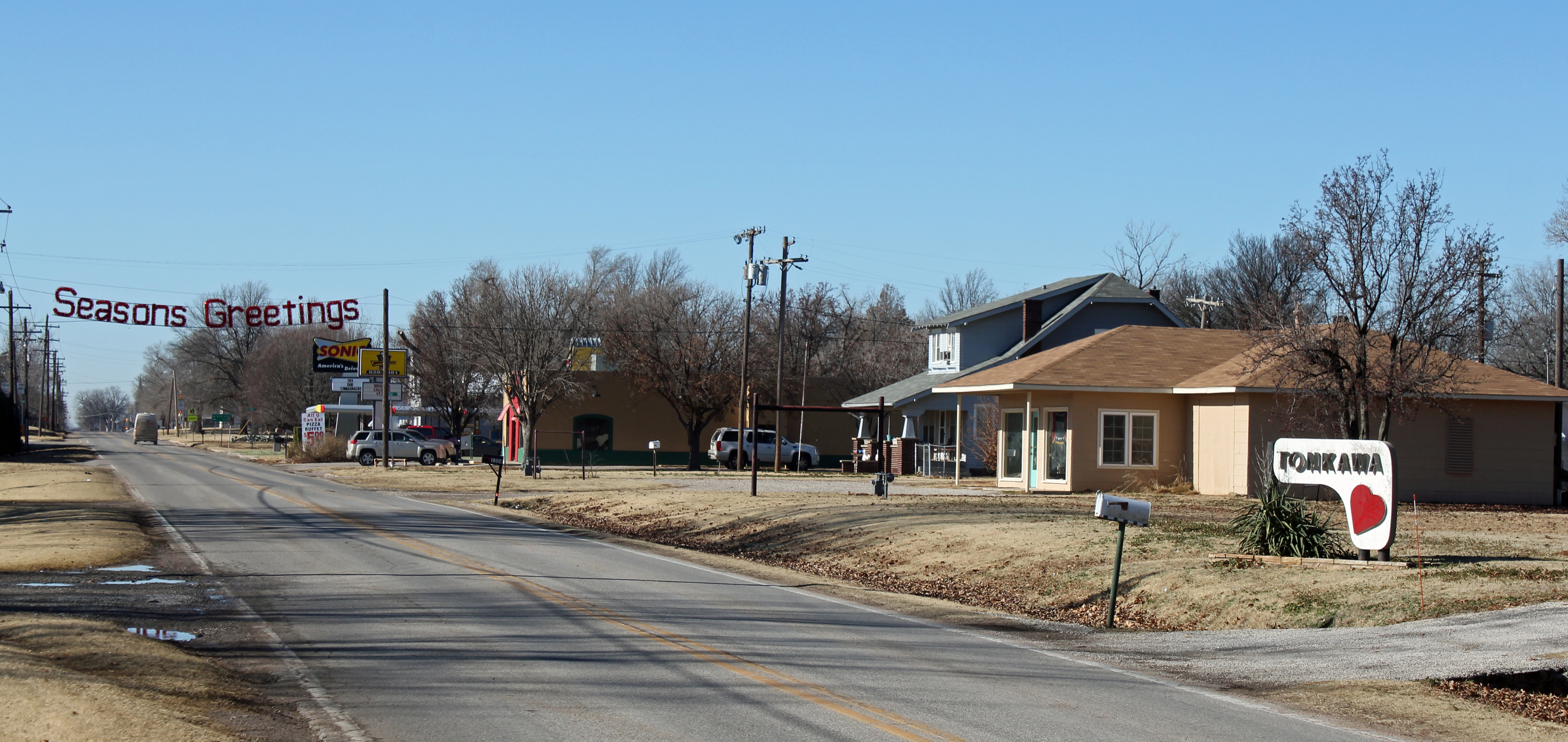
- Tonkawa in late 2013

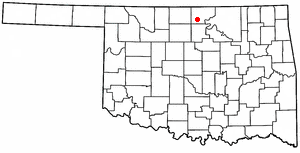
- Location of Tonkawa, Oklahoma
- Coordinates: 36°40′59″N 97°18′33″W
- Country: United States
- State: Oklahoma
- County: Kay

Area
  - Total: 4.39 sq mi (11.37 km^{2})
  - Land: 4.34 sq mi (11.24 km^{2})
  - Water: 0.050 sq mi (0.13 km^{2})
- Elevation: 994 ft (303 m)

Population (2020)
  - Total: 3,015
  - Density: 694.7/sq mi (268.23/km^{2})
- Time zone: UTC-6 (Central (CST))
  - Summer (DST): UTC-5 (CDT)
- ZIP code: 74653
- Area code: 580
- FIPS code: 40-74150
- GNIS feature ID: 2412083
- Website: tonkawaok.gov

Tonkawa is a city in Kay County, Oklahoma, United States, along the Salt Fork Arkansas River. The population was 3,015 as of the 2020 United States census.

== History ==
Named after the Tonkawa tribe, the city of Tonkawa was founded in March 1894 by Eli V. Blake and Wiley William Gregory. Blake and Gregory, originally from Kansas, claimed the land that would become Tonkawa in the Land Run of 1893. Prior to the land run, from 1879 to 1885, the area was known as "Fort Oakland", home to the Nez Perce people. In 1885, the remnants of the Tonkawa tribe, who had fled Indian Territory after the 1862 Tonkawa Massacre, returned to settle in the Fort Oakland area. The Blackwell and Southern Railway (later bought by the Atchison, Topeka and Santa Fe Railway) built a line through Tonkawa, which stimulated growth of the town. In 1901, the Oklahoma Territory Legislature established the University Preparatory School (now Northern Oklahoma College) here. By statehood, the population was 1,238. The discovery of oil caused a boom in the 1920s, and the population was 3,311 in 1930.

=== Camp Tonkawa ===
During World War II, Tonkawa was home to Camp Tonkawa, a prisoner-of-war camp. Camp Tonkawa remained in operation from August 30, 1943, to September 1, 1945. Built between October and December 1942, the 160-acre (0.65 km^{2}) site contained more than 180 wooden structures for 3,000 German POWs as well as 500 U.S. Army guard troops, service personnel and civilian employees. The first prisoners, consisting of German troops from the Afrika Korps, arrived in August 1943. During their internment, prisoners labored at local farms and ranches. In November 1943, a prison riot caused the death of a German soldier, Johannes Kunze. Eight prisoners briefly escaped, only to be recaptured.

== Geography ==
Tonkawa is located in southwestern Kay County on the Salt Fork of the Arkansas River, 14 miles (23 km) west of Ponca City. U.S. Route 60 passes through the northern side of the city, leading east to Ponca City and west 14 miles (23 km) to Lamont. U.S. Route 77 follows US 60 east to Ponca City, but turns south in Tonkawa and becomes Main Street, then leads south 28 miles (45 km) to Perry. Interstate 35 passes 2 miles (3 km) west of the center of Tonkawa, with access from Exits 211 and 214. I-35 leads south 87 miles (140 km) to Oklahoma City and north 70 miles (110 km) to Wichita, Kansas.

According to the United States Census Bureau, Tonkawa has a total area of 5.4 square miles (14.0 km^{2}), of which 0.03 square miles (0.07 km^{2}), or 0.48%, are water.

== Demographics ==
Historical population
Census	Pop.	Note	%±
1900	707		—
1910	1,776		151.2%
1920	1,448		−18.5%
1930	3,311		128.7%
1940	3,197		−3.4%
1950	3,643		14.0%
1960	3,415		−6.3%
1970	3,337		−2.3%
1980	3,524		5.6%
1990	3,127		−11.3%
2000	3,162		1.1%
2010	3,216		1.7%
2020	3,015		−6.2%
U.S. Decennial Census

=== 2020 census ===
As of the 2020 census, Tonkawa had a population of 3,015. The median age was 34.0 years. 22.0% of residents were under the age of 18 and 16.8% of residents were 65 years of age or older. For every 100 females there were 97.1 males, and for every 100 females age 18 and over there were 96.6 males age 18 and over.

0% of residents lived in urban areas, while 100.0% lived in rural areas.

There were 1,095 households in Tonkawa, of which 32.1% had children under the age of 18 living in them. Of all households, 46.7% were married-couple households, 18.0% were households with a male householder and no spouse or partner present, and 27.6% were households with a female householder and no spouse or partner present. About 28.6% of all households were made up of individuals and 13.8% had someone living alone who was 65 years of age or older.

There were 1,312 housing units, of which 16.5% were vacant. Among occupied housing units, 68.1% were owner-occupied and 31.9% were renter-occupied. The homeowner vacancy rate was 3.4% and the rental vacancy rate was 13.7%.

Racial composition as of the 2020 census
Race	Percent
White	78.2%
Black or African American	1.4%
American Indian and Alaska Native	6.7%
Asian	0.4%
Native Hawaiian and Other Pacific Islander	0.1%
Some other race	3.5%
Two or more races	9.7%
Hispanic or Latino (of any race)	9.1%

=== 2000 census ===
As of the census of 2000, there were 3,299 people, 1,197 households, and 801 families residing in the city. The population density was 591.3 inhabitants per square mile (228.3/km^{2}). There were 1,417 housing units at an average density of 254.0 per square mile (98.1/km^{2}). The racial makeup of the city was 86.39% White, 0.85% African American, 5.55% Native American, 0.33% Asian, 3.06% from other races, and 3.82% from two or more races. Hispanic or Latino of any race were 6.64% of the population.

There were 1,197 households, out of which 32.0% had children under the age of 18 living with them, 53.8% were married couples living together, 8.9% had a female householder with no husband present, and 33.0% were non-families. 29.1% of all households were made up of individuals, and 13.4% had someone living alone who was 65 years of age or older. The average household size was 2.47 and the average family size was 3.06.

In the city, the population was spread out, with 24.9% under the age of 18, 17.3% from 18 to 24, 23.6% from 25 to 44, 19.0% from 45 to 64, and 15.3% who were 65 years of age or older. The median age was 33 years. For every 100 females, there were 98.1 males. For every 100 females age 18 and over, there were 95.2 males.

The median income for a household in the city was $29,387, and the median income for a family was $35,912. Males had a median income of $27,222 versus $20,128 for females. The per capita income for the city was $14,245. About 12.5% of families and 17.6% of the population were below the poverty line, including 23.9% of those under age 18 and 9.0% of those age 65 or over.

== Education ==
Tonkawa is covered by the Tonkawa Public Schools district which includes Tonkawa Elementary, Tonkawa Middle School, and Tonkawa High School. Tonkawa is also home to Northern Oklahoma College which provides Associates level education.

== Points of interest ==
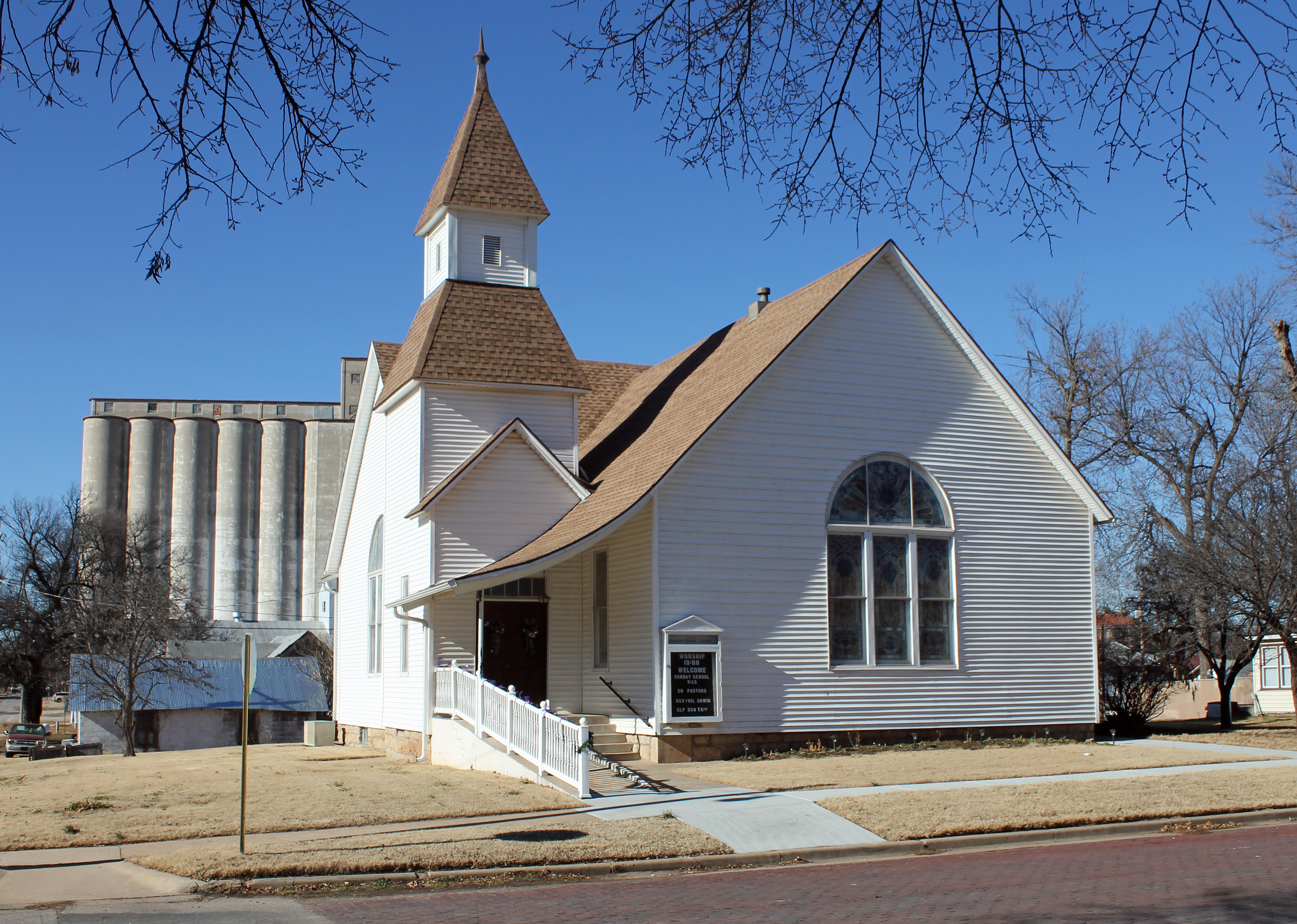
First Presbyterian Church of Tonkawa Courtesy of Jeffrey Beall. December 27, 2013

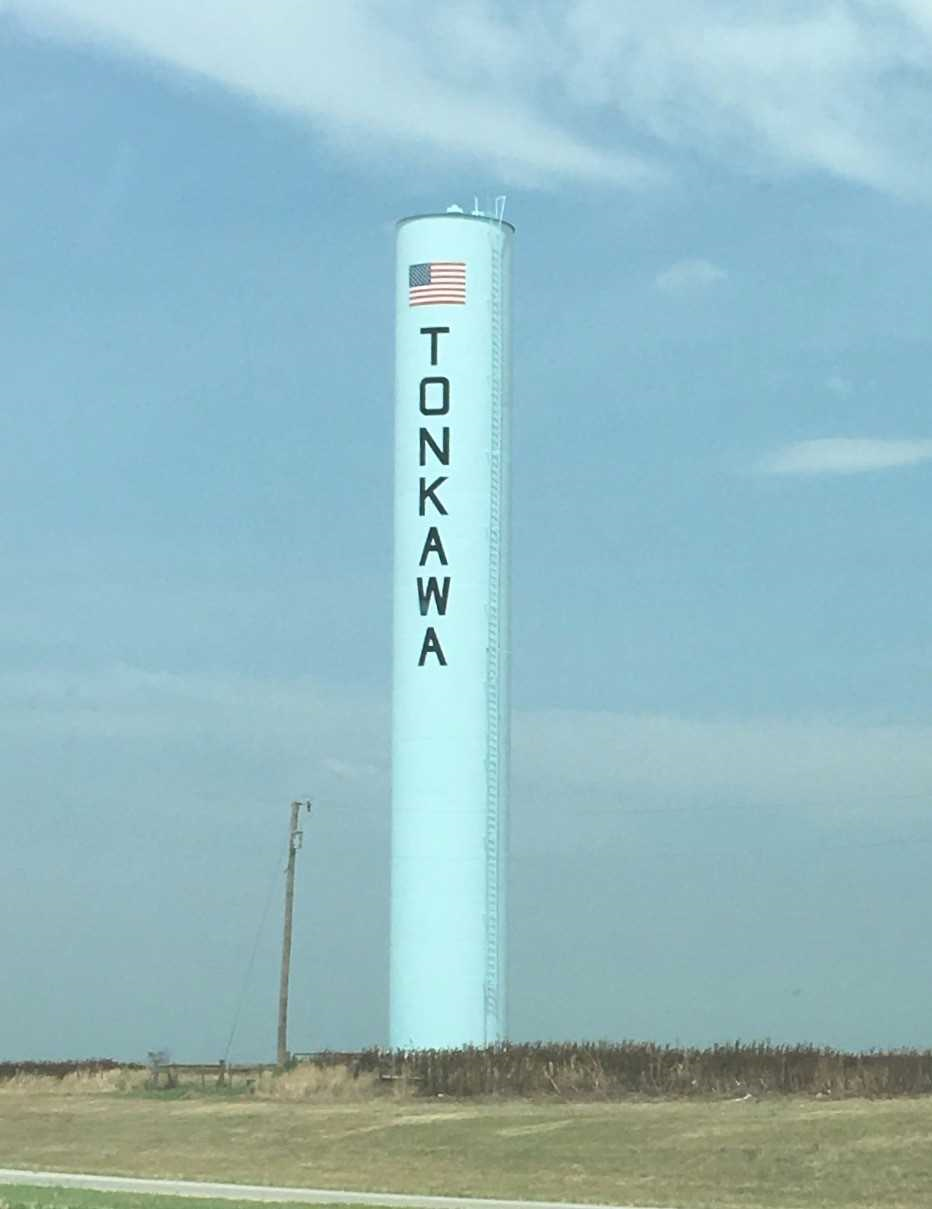
Tonkawa water tower

=== Museums ===
- North Oklahoma Botanical Garden and Arboretum
- A. D. Buck Museum of Science and History
- Tonkawa Historical Museum (McCarter Museum)
- Tonkawa Tribal Museum
- Eleanor Hays Art Gallery (at Northern Oklahoma College)
- Pickens Learning Commons

=== NRHP sites ===
The following sites in Tonkawa are listed on the National Register of Historic Places in Kay County, Oklahoma:

- First Presbyterian Church of Tonkawa
- Mahoney House and Garage
- Nez Perce Reservation
- Tonkawa Armory
- Tonkawa Masonic Lodge #157

== Notable people ==
- Clara Archilta, watercolor painter and beadworker.
- Henry Bellmon, first Republican governor of Oklahoma (1963–1967, 1991–1995) and U.S. senator (1969–1981) from Billings, OK
- Bo Bowling, Montreal Alouettes player

== See also ==
- Tonkawa massacre
