= Kaw =

Kaw or KAW may refer to:

== Mythology ==
- Kaw (bull), a legendary bull in Meitei mythology
- Johnny Kaw, mythical settler of Kansas, US
- Kaw (character), in The Chronicles of Prydain

== Name ==
- Kaw (surname)

== Ethnic groups ==
- Kaw people, a Native American tribe
- Akha people, also known by the exonym Kaw or Ekaw/Ikaw, an ethnic group in southern China, Myanmar, Thailand and Laos
- Mpi people, also known as Kaw, an ethnic group in Thailand

== Places ==
- Kaw, French Guiana, a town
- Kaw City, Oklahoma, US
- Kaw Lake, Oklahoma, US
- Kansas River, US, known as Kaw

== Other uses ==
- Kaw (film), 2007
- Kawthaung Airport, Burma, by IATA code
- Kick Ass Wrestling, former name of Memphis Championship Wrestling
