= North Topeka, Kansas =

Northern region of Topeka, Kansas

Coordinates: 39°04′20″N 95°40′01″W

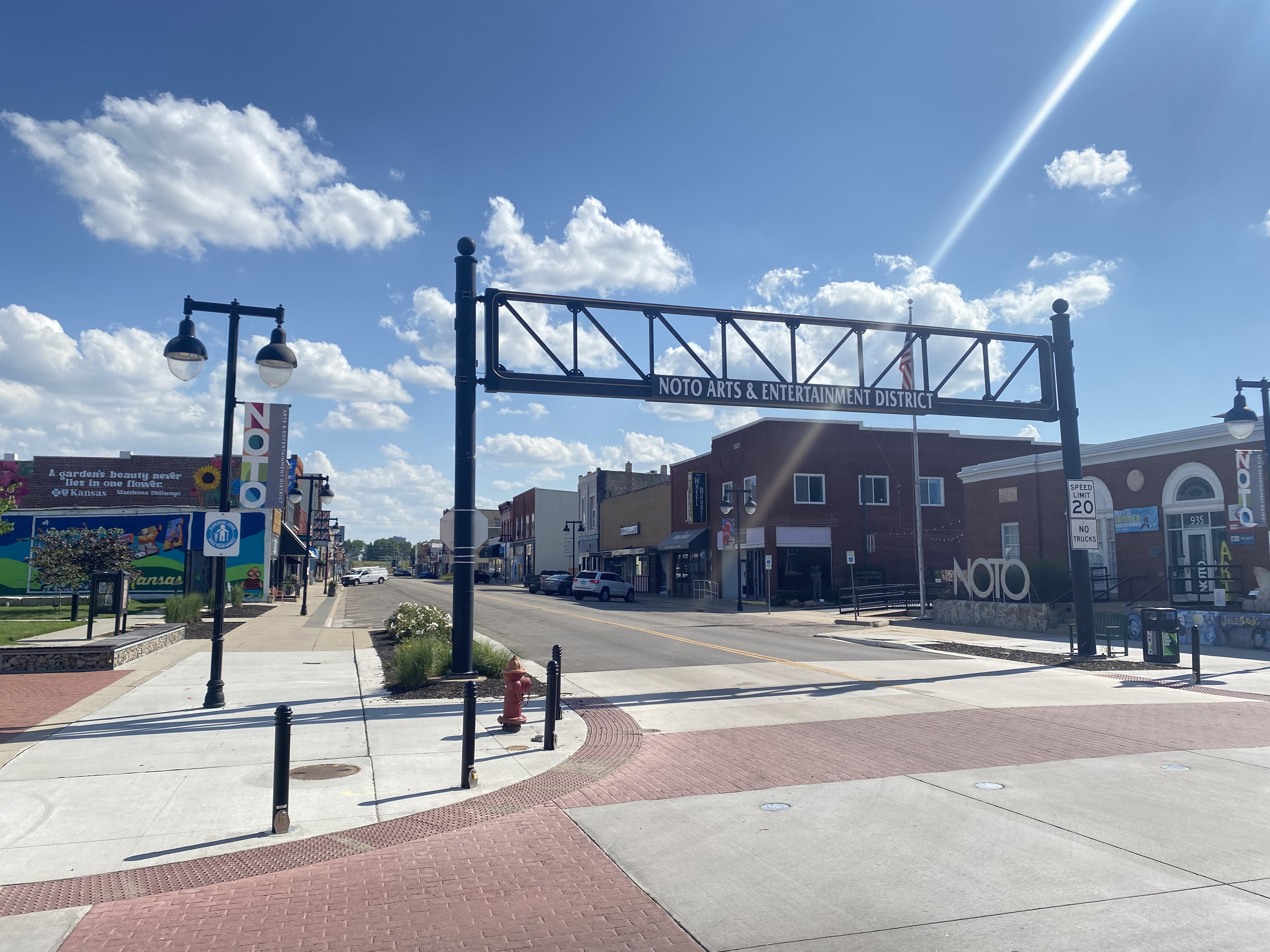
North Topeka Arts District (2025)

North Topeka, Kansas, is an area of Topeka, Kansas, in United States. Although not officially a city, it is treated like one by many of its residents, and experiences relatively low crime rates compared to the rest of Topeka. Unlike most of the City of Topeka, North Topeka is served primarily by the Seaman USD 345 School District. The City of Topeka was actually incorporated in North Topeka.

== History ==
William Curtis (grandfather of Charles Curtis, who was born in North Topeka and went on to become Vice President of the United States under Hoover) and Louis Laurent laid out a town in 1865 that they called Eugene (possibly after a place in Indiana). Less than a year later, on New Year's Day, what is now North Topeka welcomed the first train (Union Pacific) to town. The advent of the railroad assured that this area would for much of the 19th century be the industrial heart of the Kansas capital (excluding the mammoth AT&SF shops across the river).

In April 1867, southside Topeka annexed Eugene, the first such city expansion. At the time more evenly matched in population and economy, north and south played a tug-of-war for industry and commerce during the remainder of the 1800s. In 1903, North Topeka suffered the devastating effects of a major flood. However, many fine buildings dating from that period remain, and, when restored, will make North Topeka a showplace of Victorian-era commercial and residential architecture.

== Landmarks ==
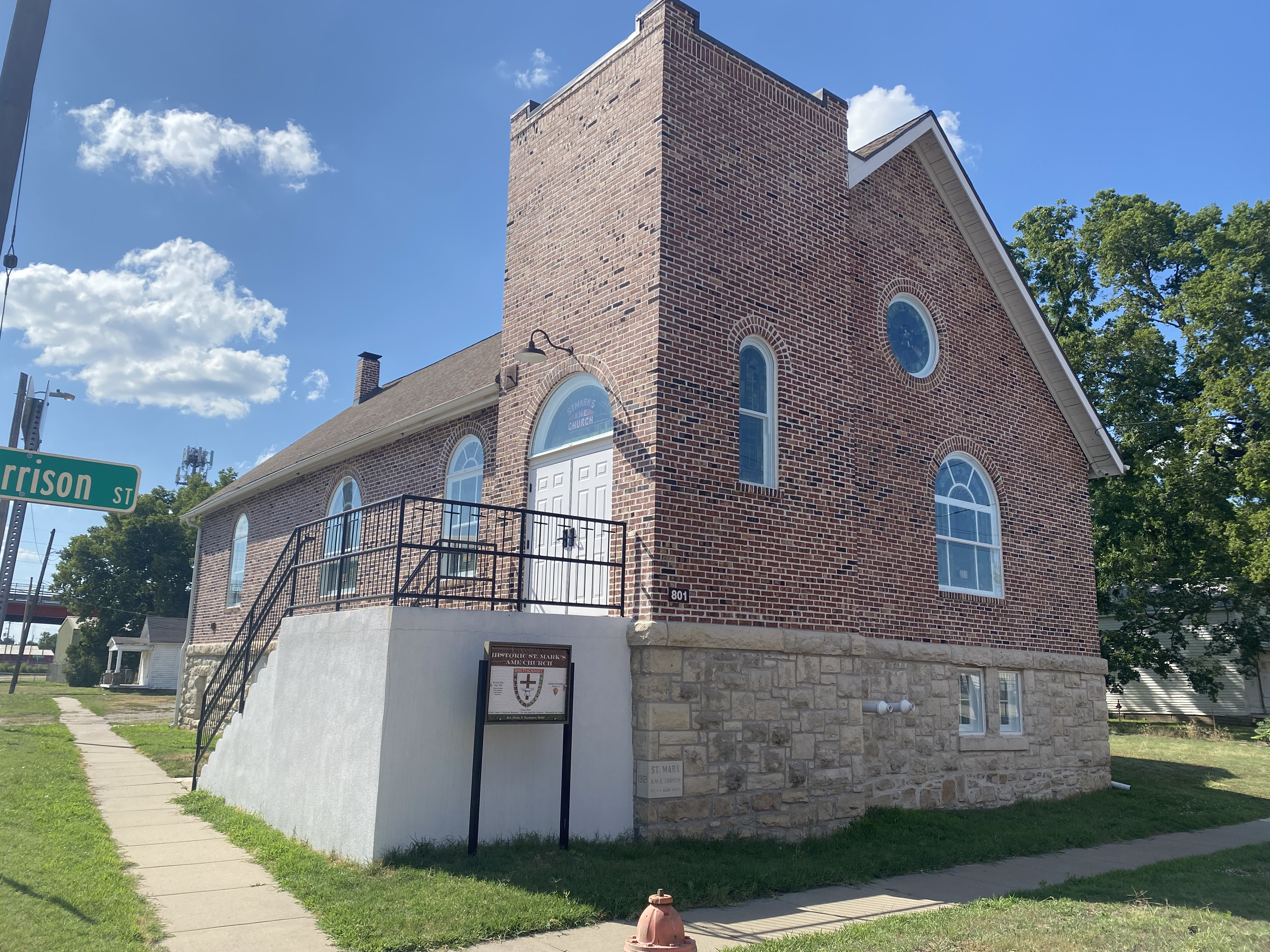
St. Mark's African Methodist Episcopal Church in North Topeka (2025)

- The Great Overland Station (http://www.greatoverlandstation.com/) (1927) is a neo-classical station designed by Los Angeles firm Gilbert S. Underwood; the building has a spectacular interior typical of grand stations of the early 20th century. Over the years, many dignitaries passed through; in June 1945, Gen. Eisenhower stopped here on his way to Abilene. North Topeka was one of the most photographed of Union Pacific's mid-sized stations. It has been fully restored.
- Curtis Family Cemetery: A small family plot tended to by local volunteers due to there being no remaining direct descendants. Interred here are the grandparents, parents, and other relatives of Vice President Curtis, who was born in a nearby log cabin. In 2022 a news report revealed that the cemetery had been repeatedly vandalized. Volunteers organized online to step up their efforts.
- St. Mark's AME Church: Built in 1880 as a result of "Exodusters" (black refugees) coming from slave states. At least some of the land associated with this church was donated by Charles Curtis when he was 19. This was land his grandmother received as part of an 1825 treaty between the Kanza tribe and the federal government, negotiated by Curtis' great-great-grandfather, White Plume, and explorer William Clark.

== Education ==
- North Topeka Schools: Topeka Public Schools serve over 13,000 students, employing more than 1,300 teachers and 1,100 support staff. Student ethnicity breaks down into 3 main categories: 42% white, 27% Hispanic, and 27% Black.
