= Senator Farnsworth =

Senator Farnsworth may refer to:

- Daniel D. T. Farnsworth (1819–1892), West Virginia State Senate
- Dave Farnsworth (born 1951), Arizona State Senate
- Eddie Farnsworth (born 1961), Arizona State Senate
- Hiram Warner Farnsworth (1816–1899), Territorial Senate of Kansas
- Robert Farnsworth (politician) (fl. 2020s), Minnesota State Senate
- Thomas J. Farnsworth (1829–1916), West Virginia State Senate
- Walter K. Farnsworth (1870–1929), Vermont State Senate
