= Joseph James and Joseph James Jr. =

Kansa-Osage-French interpreters

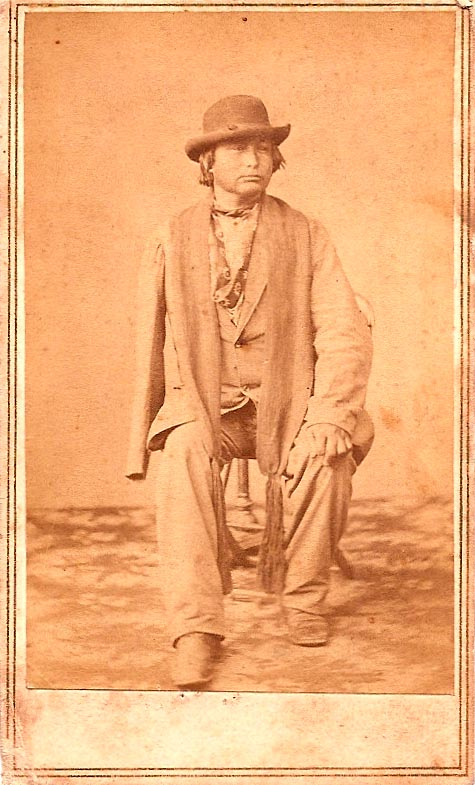
Joseph James Jr. in 1867. Photo by Indian Agent Hiram Warner Farnsworth.

Joseph James and Joseph James Jr. were two men of Kansa-Osage-French descent who became interpreters and guides on the Kansas and Indian Territory frontier in the 19th century. European Americans often referred to either man as "Joe Jim" or "Jojim". Both were prominent on the frontier as intermediaries between white and Native American (Indian) cultures.

== Joe Jim ==
Joe Jim Sr. was probably born in the 1790s at the Osage town in Vernon County, Missouri. He was probably the son of a French trader and an Osage woman. By about 1815, Joe Jim was living among the Kaw tribe along the Kansas River in what would become the state of Kansas. Joe Jim married Wyhesee (b. c. 1802), a daughter of Kaw chieftain White Plume. He became an important member of the tribe. Joe Jim was a signatory to an 1825 treaty ceding Kaw land to the United States government, under the name of Ky-he-ga-shin-ga (Little Chief).

Fluent in Kaw (Kanza) and Osage (nearly identical with Kaw), and later French and English, he became an interpreter for the U.S. government about 1829. In 1830, he served as a guide for a surveying expedition to western Kansas by missionary Isaac McCoy. McCoy, critical of most of his associates, praised Joe Jim. The last record of Joe Jim is 1837, when he was still employed by the U.S. government as an interpreter. (A Joseph James is listed in the 1843 census of the Kaw, but whether this refers to Joe Jim Sr. or Joe Jim Jr. is unclear.)

== Joe Jim Jr. ==
Joe Jim Jr. was born about 1820 and his place of birth was given as "Big Bottom", a place along the Kansas River. (Joe Jim Jr.'s birth date on his tombstone is given as 1814, but that date is inconsistent with other statements concerning his age.) Of Kaw/Osage and French descent, he likely grew up speaking Kaw, Osage, French and later English. Like many on the frontier, he was apparently illiterate.

In 1846 and 1847, during the Mexican–American War, together with Peter Revard, a mixed-blood Osage, Joe Jim drove a herd of cattle from Kansas to New Mexico to feed American soldiers. He worked as a teamster during a United States military campaign against the Navajo. While returning to Kansas in a wagon train, he survived a Comanche attack that resulted in the deaths of two American soldiers.

In the 1850s, Joe Jim had an arm amputated due to "poisoning", which ended his active life. He became an interpreter for the U.S. government in 1858, and thereafter was a principal point of contact between Whites and the Kaw tribe. He lived in both worlds but was not accepted fully in either.

One of the US Indian agents for whom Joe Jim worked was Hiram Warner Farnsworth. In 1859, James served as an informant for pioneering ethnologist Lewis Henry Morgan. Morgan said of him:

He is half French and half Kaw [Joe Jim was one-fourth or less French and three-fourths Kaw and Osage], and bright and intelligent. … He is married to a Potawatomi woman, and lives in a good log house on the bank of the beautiful Kansas River. He has a second house in which the cooking and eating is done. I took dinner with them and it was very good.

Joe Jim had married Margaret Curley, a full-blooded Potawatomi. Like many other tribes in the 1830s, the Potawatomi had been removed by the US from east of the Mississippi River. The U.S. military forced them to move to Kansas from the Ohio River valley.

Joe Jim has been credited with naming Topeka, Kansas. Asked by White settlers what the name of the place was, he answered, "Topeka", stating that its Native American name meant "a good place to grow potatoes". This was probably in reference to the prairie turnip, cultivated by the Kaw and Osage, rather than the common potato known to European Americans.

In 1867, Joe Jim accompanied a Kaw delegation headed by Chief Al-le-ga-wa-ho to Washington. The Kaw were declining rapidly as a tribe, and losing their lands to White settlers. They sought a new reservation free of white squatters in the Indian Territory (later Oklahoma).

Joe Jim was involved in one of the most colorful and public Indian battles in the West. On June 1, 1868, about 100 Cheyenne warriors descended upon the Kaw reservation near Council Grove, Kansas. The Kaw men sallied forth to meet them, and for four hours, the tribes staged a military pageant described as a "battle royal". When the Cheyenne retired from the field, they took a few stolen horses and a peace offering of coffee and sugar donated by the merchants of Council Grove. Nobody was seriously hurt on either side.

During the battle, Joe Jim galloped 60 miles (97 km) on horseback to Topeka to inform the governor that the enemy Cheyenne were attacking and to request assistance. With him on the ride was an eight-year-old nephew called "Indian Charley". This was Charles Curtis, who later was elected as a Congressman and as Vice President of the United States.

On June 4, 1873, the Kaw, diminished to 500 people by disease, alcoholism, and warfare, from their earlier population of 1,500, packed their possessions and left for a new reservation in what became Kay County, Oklahoma. Their numbers continued to decline, reaching a low of about 200 in 1890.

Joe Jim and his wife Margaret established a homestead on the east bank of the Arkansas River just south of the border with Kansas. He died September 21, 1898, the oldest of the Kaw. He was buried in the Washunga cemetery, since relocated to Newkirk, Oklahoma.
