= Washunga, Oklahoma =

- Unincorporated community
- Location within Oklahoma Location within the United States
- Coordinates: 36°47′1″N 96°50′17″W
- Country: United States
- State: Oklahoma
- County: Kay
- Elevation: 1,024 ft (312 m)
- Time zone: UTC-6 (Central (CST))
  - Summer (DST): UTC-5 (CDT)
- GNIS feature ID: 1099416

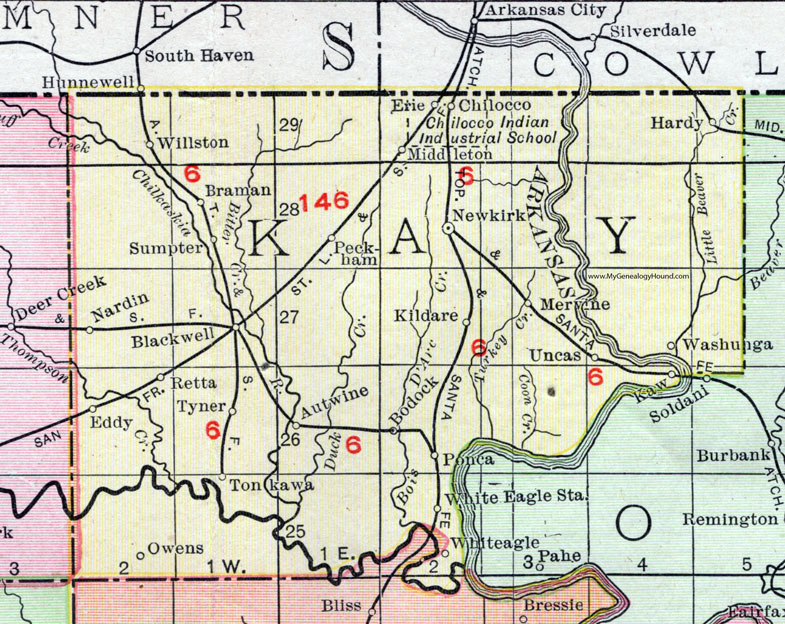
Kay County in 1911, showing Washunga. The Kaw Reservation was all the land in the county east of the Arkansas River.

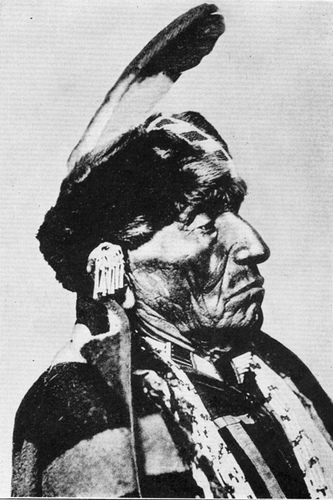
Washunga, the Kaw chieftain.

Washunga is a small community and ghost town in Kay County, Oklahoma, United States. Washunga was named for the leader of the Kaw Indians in the late 19th and early 20th century. The word means "bird" in the Kaw language. The name was often spelled Washungah. The town was established in 1903 at the headquarters of the Kaw tribe, called the Kaw Agency. A post office was established at the Kaw Agency in 1880 and continued until 1918.

The building housing the former Kaw Agency is listed on the NRHP. In the early 1970s, the building was relocated a few hundred yards north to the present site as the waters of Kaw Lake covered the original site.

== History ==
In 1873, 533 Kaw Indians were removed from their reservation near Council Grove, Kansas to a new reservation in what would become Kay County, Oklahoma. The land of their reservation in Kansas had been encroached upon by white settlers and their residence there had become untenable. The land of their new reservation, totaling 100,137 acres (40,524 ha), was partially wooded but mostly tallgrass prairie in the southernmost extension of the Flint Hills. a rocky, hilly area little suited to cultivation but excellent for grazing. The land was purchased from the Osage with proceeds from the sale of Kaw land in Kansas.

A location at the junction of the Arkansas River and Beaver Creek was selected as the site of the headquarters, called the Kaw Agency, for the reservation. Within a few years, the headquarters area had a grist and sawmill, a school house with a dormitory for students, a barn, a post office, and a home for the superintendent of the reservation. However, the Kaw did not prosper in their new lands. About one half of them died, mostly of disease, between 1873 and 1879. In 1883, the Kaws began to lease grazing land to white ranchers, thereby losing control of some of their lands, although gaining some income. In 1903, in accordance with the Dawes Act, the U.S. government abolished the Kaw Reservation. The lands and money of the tribe were divided among 247 enrolled members of the tribe with the provision that they could not sell or transfer their land for 25 years. Among the allottees was Charles Curtis, a future Vice President of the United States and a mixed blood Kaw, who received a homestead allocation of 250 acres (100 ha) about one mile north of Washunga.

In 1902, the community near the Kaw Agency was named Washunga. The Kaw Agency at Washunga remained in operation until 1928, after which Kaw landowners disposed of much of the land that had been allocated to them. By 1945, only 13,261 acres of the original 100,000 acre reservation was still owned by tribal members.

In the early 1900s, the community of Washunga had grocery stores, service stations, a jail, a pool hall, several other businesses, and a city government. By about 1950, only the primary school remained and the population of the area was 100 to 150 people. Kaw City, about one mile distant and on the opposite bank of the Arkansas River, grew as Washunga faltered.

In 1976, Kaw Lake was completed. Washunga was covered by its waters. The Kaw Agency building was moved a few hundred yards and the Washunga cemetery was moved to Newkirk, Oklahoma.
