= Hiram Warner Farnsworth =

American politician

Hiram Warner Farnsworth (October 13, 1816, in Brattleboro, Vermont – July 26, 1899, in Topeka, Kansas) was an abolitionist, Kansas pioneer, educator, Indian agent and community leader.

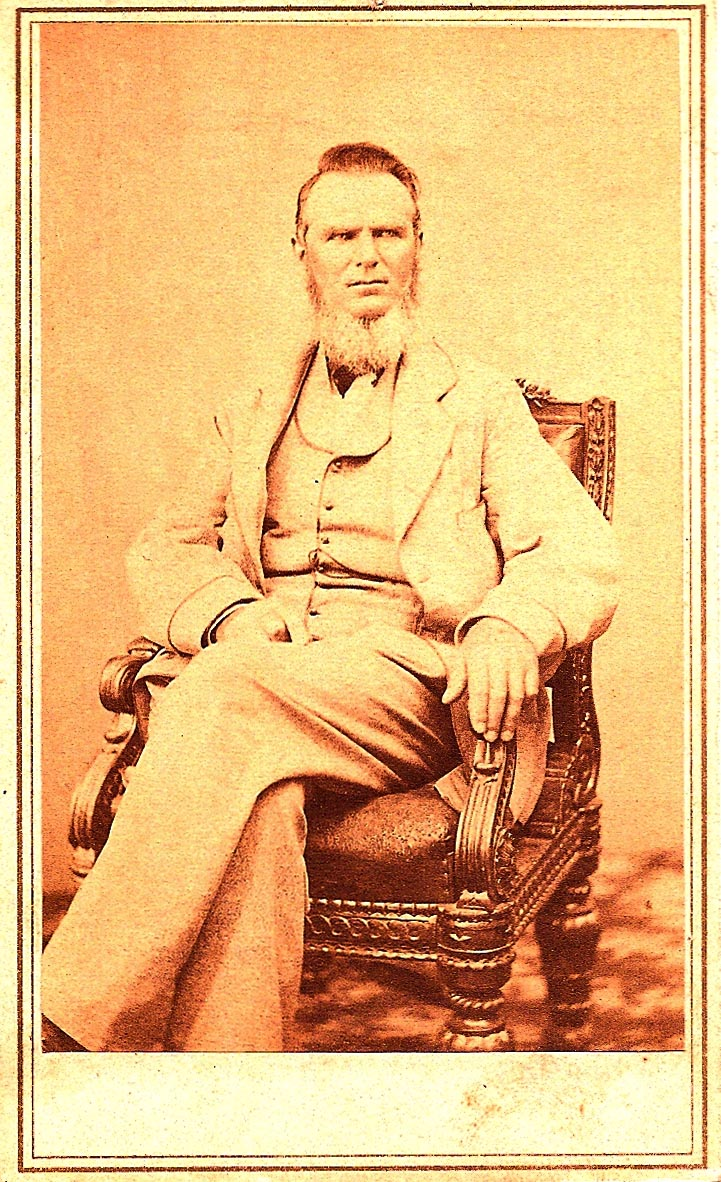
Hiram Warner Farnsworth 1868 Topeka, Kansas

== Early life ==
Hiram Warner Farnsworth (H. W.) (Note: H.W. is used here as most external references to Hiram use those initials instead of the full name.) was educated at Brattleboro, Vermont. H.W. attended Williams College in Williamstown, Massachusetts, in 1836 and graduated in 1840. He was a member of Phi Beta Kappa. He taught school in Tuskegee, Alabama, from June 1840 to December 1841. He was appointed Principal of the New London Female Academy in New London, Connecticut, a position he held until March 1855.

On March 17, 1842, H.W. married Deborah (Della) Torrey Lerow in Boston. She was born on July 5, 1815, in Orange, Massachusetts. She was a teacher of French and Botany at the New London academy. They had three children one of whom died thirteen months after his birth. Della died on June 5, 1850.

He also served as the railroad agent at New London for one year for the Northern Railroad. On December 3, 1855, H.W. married his second wife, Harriet Ann Stoddard (born May 28, 1822).

In the 1850s H.W. participated in the public discussions of the era concerning slavery. H.W. was a Congregationalist and abolitionist. As the political turmoil increased he decided on a course of action inspired by the New England Emigrant Aid Company of Boston. This company was formed to facilitate overland treks to Kansas of Free-Stater families to help throw pre-statehood Kansas into the abolitionists camp. The New England Emigrant Aid Company was formed to help fund resettlement of abolitionist sympathizers in Kansas prior to referendums to determine if Kansas would be a slave state. Three groups sponsored by the Society set out for Kansas – the first in March 1855. H.W. didn't leave New England until March 4, 1856 with his new wife who was pregnant and with his two small daughters from his first marriage. It took six weeks to trek by wagon to Kansas.

== Kansas pioneer ==
On May 9, 1856, H.W. and his family arrived in Lawrence in the Kansas Territory which was quickly seen to be unsuitable even though Lawrence had been founded by the New England Emigrant Aid Company. The family moved on to Topeka, Kansas, arriving May 16, 1856. Topeka was laid out in 1854 as a Free-State town. Pioneer H.W.'s first act in Topeka was the purchase of a farm and then the start-up of the Topeka Mill Co., a saw, grist and flouring mill, in association with A. Merrill and S. T. Walkley. On July 14, 1856, H.W. helped found and became one of the first deacons of "The First Free Congregational Church of Topeka". H.W. was then elected on December 6, 1859, to the first Territorial Senate of Kansas prior to statehood. He was a Republican representative of Shawnee County. The following year he was elected as the fourth mayor of Topeka. After much turmoil, Kansas was admitted to the union as a free state on January 29, 1861.

H.W. resigned from the Kansas Senate May 1, 1861, in order to accept an Indian Agency appointment in Morris County at Council Grove, Kansas, and in June 1861 President Abraham Lincoln appointed him as agent to the Kaw Indians. (Note: Four Kaw Indian families took the name of Farnsworth in the 1860s when they were obliged to adopt surnames for the census.) Joseph James (Joe Jim), a mixed-blood Kaw Indian, was an interpreter for H.W. H.W. became an Indian Commissioner June 24, 1864, by order of Abraham Lincoln who appointed "Hiram W. Farnsworth, Indian Agent a commissioner on the part of the United States and the chiefs and headmen of the Kansas Tribe of Indians." H.W. was still living with his family at the Council Grove Indian Agency June 3, 1868. On that date a skirmish of the Cheyenne with the Kaw Indians occurred. This battle was full of sound and fury but had no casualties and this was the last Indian battle in the state of Kansas. It was conducted at the Council Grove Indian Agency and other locations with some arrows even landing in the grounds of the agency — the Farnsworth family members were spectators. (Note: It is probably in this time period that his courtesy title as Major was established, since he never held military rank.) During his tenure there, H.W. was appointed on March 13, 1862, for six months to be Commissioner on the part of the United States to negotiate treaties with the Kansas Indian tribes. Treaties concluded at the Kansas Agency with about one hundred tribes were signed by H.W. with his signature and seal.

Due to his prominence in the Topeka area, H.W. became one of the first directors for the Atchison & Topeka Railroad on March 3, 1863. (Note: In 1920, the town of Farnsworth, Texas, was named for H.W. as an early director of the Atchison, Topeka & Santa Fe Railroad.) Similarly, due to his background in education, H.W. was a founder of Washburn College, incorporated February 6, 1865, from Lincoln College. H.W. served on the board of trustees of that college for twenty years. In October 1866 he was replaced as Indian Agent by President Andrew Johnson and then in December appointed by the president to be one of three commissioners to visit and inspect Indian schools. In 1867 he accompanied the Indian tribal leaders to Washington, D.C., to sign treaties along with his Kaw Indian interpreter, Joe Jim. It was customary at the time that Indian chiefs visiting Washington be photographed in full tribal regalia with their Indian Agent. H.W. declined that honor because he felt the Indians were being cheated of their lands and hence he did not wish to be associated with such an endeavor. (Note: This trip to Washington, D.C. was the occasion for the photograph made of his Kaw Indian interpreter Joe Jim.) H.W.'s interpreter, Joe Jim, is credited for giving the name of Topeka to that town.

== Later years in Topeka ==
In May 1867 H.W. moved his family back to Topeka to live in the home he had built at 401 Topeka Ave. By now his family included seven children. On May 21, 1867, citizens of Topeka voted to form the Topeka Board of Education and elected H.W. to that first board.

On September 25, 1867, H.W. signed a petition to the state of Kansas which supported voting rights for women and blacks. He was one of forty-five Kansas signers. In March 1869 H.W. was appointed postmaster of Topeka which position he held until 1873. In 1870 H.W. joined the Pilgrim Society. 1870 was the 250th anniversary year of the Pilgrim's landing at Plymouth, Mass. (Note: H.W. was a descendant of Matthias Farnsworth who arrived in the Plymouth area in 1635.) H.W. was appointed police judge of Topeka in 1874. In 1876 he was elected Secretary (clerk) of the Board of Education of Topeka which office he held until his death. In 1876 he was elected secretary of the Topeka Masonic Lodge, a position he filled for the rest of his life. The Free Public Library of Topeka was founded November 12, 1878, with H.W. as one of the founders. H.W. was a member of the Association of Old Settlers of Topeka because of his early arrival in 1856.

On January 6, 1894, Harriet died. On July 26, 1899, H.W. died at his home in Topeka.

== Family ==
- H.W. married Deborah (Della) Torrey Lerow in Boston, Massachusetts, March 17, 1842

They had 3 children:

- Kate Leland (1843-1930)
- Mary Emma "Minnie" (1845-1927)
- Oliver Dimon (1847-1848)

Della died on June 5, 1850.

- H.W. married Harriet Ann Stoddard in New London, Connecticut, December 3, 1855

They had 5 children:

- William Seymour Epaphroditus (1856-1930)
- Adeline Lurena "Addie" (1858-1938)
- James Watson Brown (1860-1940)
- Coit Learned (1863-1936)
- Fred Colfax (1866-1945)

== See also ==
- Joseph James and Joseph James, Jr.

== Notes ==
Footnotes
