= Lucy Tayiah Eads =

Chief of the Kaw Nation (1888–1961

- Cha-me
- Lucy Tayiah Eads

Kaw people leader

Personal details
- Born: October 4, 1888 Indian Territory
- Died: October 11, 1961 (aged 73) Pawhuska, Oklahoma
- Resting place: Pawhuska, Oklahoma
- Spouse(s): Herbert Edward Kimber; John Eads
- Known for: First female tribal chief of the Kaw
- Nickname: Chief Lucy

Lucy Tayiah Eads or Cha-me (also known as Chief Lucy) (1888–1961) was elected the first female tribal chief of the Kaw Indians in 1922. She was the first chief of the Kaws since 1908.

== Early life and education ==
Lucy Tayiah was born in 1888 in Indian Territory, along Beaver Creek. Her parents were Lezitte Betrand (also known as Mo Jan Ah Hoe) and Little Tayiah. Her mother, Lezitte Betrand, was Kaw and Potawatomi. Little Tayiah, her father, was Kaw. Taiyah also had one brother, Emmett (also known as Ki He Kah Mah She).

Around 1892, both of her parents died of starvation. Tayiah and her brother became orphans. They were adopted by Chief Washunga. Their adoption by the Kaw tribal chief was part of tribal tradition. She attended Haskell Indian College in Lawrence, Kansas, where she studied nursing. She moved to New York City. She married Herbert Edward Kimber around 1908. They had three children, all girls. Eventually, they divorced. She married John Rhea Eads around 1913. They would have six more children.

== Political career ==
Chief Washungah died in 1908. Not until 1922 did the Kaws have another tribal leader. Eads was elected in November 1922, becoming the first woman to become chief of the Kaw Nation. She was voted in by eight council members. Eads went by the name Chief Lucy during her tenure as chief. She tried to gain recognition for the tribe from the federal government, in 1924, but this was said to be contrary to the Allotment Agreement and denied. In 1929, she attended the Inauguration of Herbert Hoover, representing the Kaw Nation. In 1928, after Eads was reelected, the Kaw government was abolished until its restoration under the Oklahoma Indian Welfare Act of 1936.

== Health career ==
After serving as tribal chief, Eads returned to working as a nurse at Haskell Indian College.

== Death ==
She, with her family, eventually relocated to Pawhuska, Oklahoma. She died in 1961.
