= Charles Curtis =

Vice President of the United States from 1929 to 1933

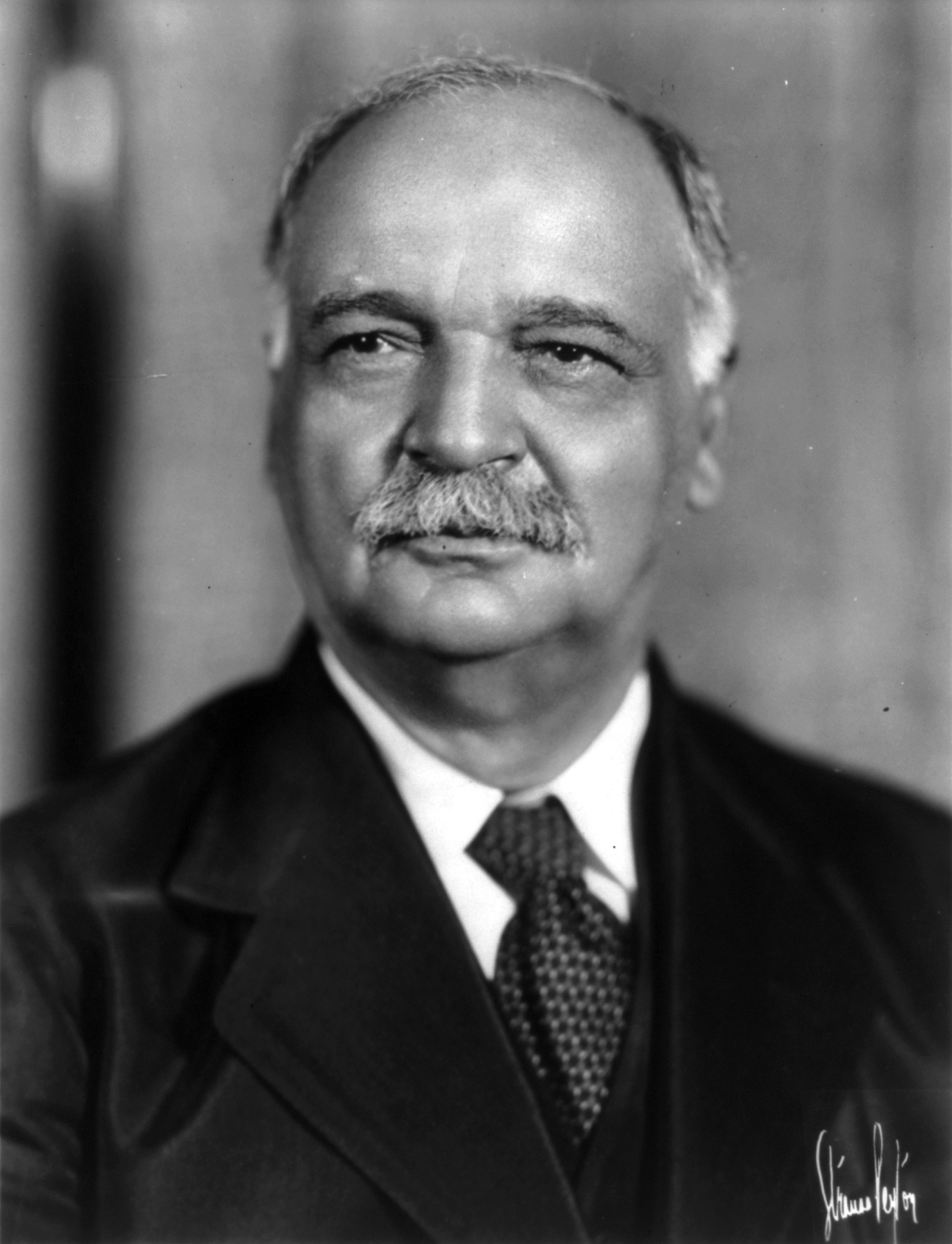
- Curtis in 1931

31st Vice President of the United States
- In office March 4, 1929 – March 4, 1933
- President: Herbert Hoover
- Preceded by: Charles G. Dawes
- Succeeded by: John Nance Garner

United States Senator from Kansas
- In office March 4, 1915 – March 3, 1929
- Preceded by: Joseph L. Bristow
- Succeeded by: Henry Justin Allen
- In office January 29, 1907 – March 3, 1913
- Preceded by: Alfred W. Benson
- Succeeded by: William Howard Thompson
Senate positions
Senate Majority Leader
In office November 28, 1924 – March 3, 1929
Whip	Wesley L. Jones
Preceded by	Henry Cabot Lodge
Succeeded by	James Eli Watson
Leader of the Senate Republican Conference
In office November 28, 1924 – March 3, 1929
Preceded by	Office established
Succeeded by	James Eli Watson
Senate Majority Whip
In office March 4, 1919 – November 28, 1924
Leader	Henry Cabot Lodge
Preceded by	J. Hamilton Lewis
Succeeded by	Wesley L. Jones
Senate Minority Whip
In office December 13, 1915 – March 3, 1919
Leader	Jacob Harold Gallinger (1915–1918); Henry Cabot Lodge (1918–1919)
Preceded by	James Wolcott Wadsworth Jr.
Succeeded by	Peter G. Gerry
President pro tempore of the United States Senate
In office December 4, 1911 – December 12, 1911
Preceded by	Augustus Octavius Bacon
Succeeded by	Augustus Octavius Bacon

Member of the U.S. House of Representatives from Kansas
- In office March 4, 1893 – January 28, 1907
- Preceded by: Case Broderick
- Succeeded by: James Monroe Miller
- Constituency: 4th district (1893–1899); 1st district (1899–1907)

Personal details
- Born: January 25, 1860 North Topeka, Kansas Territory
- Died: February 8, 1936 (aged 76) Washington, D.C., U.S.
- Resting place: Topeka Cemetery
- Citizenship: American; Kaw Nation
- Party: Republican
- Spouse: Annie Baird (m. 1884; died 1924)
- Children: 3
- Relatives: White Plume (great-great-grandfather); White Hair (great-great-great-grandfather)
- Nickname: "Indian Charlie"

Charles Curtis (January 25, 1860 – February 8, 1936) was the 31st vice president of the United States from 1929 to 1933 under President Herbert Hoover. He was the Senate majority leader from 1924 to 1929. An enrolled citizen of the Kaw Nation born in the Kansas Territory, Curtis was the first Native American to serve in the United States Congress, where he served in the United States House of Representatives and Senate before becoming Senate majority leader. Curtis also was the first and only Native American, and first multiracial person, to serve as vice president.

Curtis believed that Native Americans could benefit from mainstream education and assimilation. He entered political life when he was 32 years old and won several terms from his district in Topeka, Kansas, beginning in 1892 as a Republican to the U.S. House of Representatives. There, he sponsored and helped pass the Curtis Act of 1898, which extended the Dawes Act to the Five Civilized Tribes of the Indian Territory. Despite Curtis being unhappy with the final version, implementation of the Act completed the ending of tribal land titles in the Indian Territory, and prepared the larger territory to be admitted as the State of Oklahoma in 1907. The government tried to encourage Indians to accept individual citizenship and lands and to take up European-American culture.

Curtis was elected to the U.S. Senate first by the Kansas Legislature in 1906 and then by popular vote in 1914, 1920, and 1926. Curtis served one six-year term from 1907 to 1913, and then most of three terms from 1915 to 1929, when he was elected as vice president. He introduced the first version of the Equal Rights Amendment to the Senate in 1921; it was not approved for ratification until 1972. Curtis marshaled support to be elected as Republican Whip from 1915 to 1924 and then as Senate majority leader from 1924 to 1929. In those positions, he was instrumental in managing legislation and in accomplishing Republican national goals. His long popularity and connections in Kansas and federal politics helped make Curtis a strong leader in the Senate.

Curtis was nominated for vice president at the 1928 Republican National Convention, and became Herbert Hoover's running mate; the two won the 1928 United States presidential election in a landslide victory. In 1932, he became the first United States vice president to open the Olympic Games. However, when Curtis and Hoover ran together again later that year during the Great Depression, they lost when the public gave the Democrats Franklin D. Roosevelt and John Nance Garner a landslide victory. Curtis remains the highest-ranking Native American who ever served in the federal government. He is also the most recent officer of the executive branch to have been born in a territory, rather than a state or federal district.

== Early life and education ==
Curtis was born on January 25, 1860, in North Topeka, Kansas Territory, a year before Kansas was admitted as a state. Curtis had three-eighths Native American ancestry and five-eighths European American ancestry. His mother, Ellen Papin (also spelled Pappan), was Kaw, Osage, Potawatomi, and French. His father, Orren Curtis, was of English, Scots, and Welsh ancestry. On his mother's side, Curtis was a descendant of Chief White Plume of the Kaw Nation, and Chief Pawhuska of the Osage.

Curtis's first words as an infant were in French and Kansa, both languages that he learned from his mother. She died in 1863, when he was 3 years old, but he lived for some time thereafter with his maternal grandparents on the Kaw reservation and returned to them in later years. He learned to love racing horses and was later a highly successful jockey in prairie horse races.

After Curtis's mother died in 1863, his father remarried but soon divorced. While serving in the Union army during the Civil War, Orren Curtis was captured and imprisoned. During that period, the toddler Charles was cared for by his maternal grandparents. They also later helped him gain possession of his mother's land in North Topeka; under the Kaw matrilineal system, he inherited it from her. His father tried unsuccessfully to get control of that land. Orren Curtis married a third time and had a daughter, Theresa Permelia "Dolly" Curtis, who was born in 1866, after the end of the war.

On June 1, 1868, one hundred Cheyenne warriors invaded the Kaw Reservation. The Kaw men painted their faces, donned regalia, and rode out on horseback to confront the Cheyenne. The rival Indian warriors put on a display of superb horsemanship, accompanied with war cries and volleys of bullets and arrows. Terrified white settlers took refuge in nearby Council Grove. After about four hours, the Cheyenne retired with a few stolen horses and a peace offering of coffee and sugar from the Council Grove merchants. No one had been injured on either side. During the battle, Joe Jim, a Kaw interpreter, galloped 60 miles (97 km) to Topeka to seek assistance from the governor. Riding with Jim was the eight-year-old Charles Curtis, then nicknamed "Indian Charley."

Curtis wanted to move with the Kaw Nation, which had been removed from Kansas to the Indian Territory in 1873, but his Kaw grandmother, M. Papin, encouraged him to return to Topeka to continue his education. Curtis was strongly influenced by both sets of grandparents.

Curtis read law in an established firm, where he worked part time. He was admitted to the bar in 1881 and began his practice in Topeka. He served as prosecuting attorney of Shawnee County, Kansas, from 1885 to 1889.

== Marriage and family ==
On November 27, 1884, Curtis married Annie Elizabeth Baird (1860–1924). They had three children: Permelia Jeannette Curtis (1886–1955), Henry "Harry" King Curtis (1890–1946), and Leona Virginia Curtis (1892–1965). He and his wife also provided a home in Topeka for his paternal sister Dolly Curtis before her marriage. His wife died in 1924.

A widower when he was elected vice president in 1928, Curtis had his long-since-married sister, Dolly Curtis Gann (March 1866 – January 30, 1953), act as his official hostess for social events. She lived with her husband, Edward Everett Gann, in Washington, D.C., from their marriage in 1915 until his death in 1936. Edward Gann was a lawyer for the Interstate Commerce Commission (1910-1914), and special assistant to the US Attorney General (1914-1921), prosecuting railroads and war profiteers before going into private practice.

Attuned to social protocol, Curtis, a widower, insisted in 1929 that his sister be treated officially as the Second Lady at government functions. The diplomatic corps accommodated the request. To date, Curtis is the last vice president to remain unmarried during his entire time in office. Alben W. Barkley, who served as vice president from 1949 to 1953, entered office as a widower but remarried while in office.

== House of Representatives (1893–1907) ==
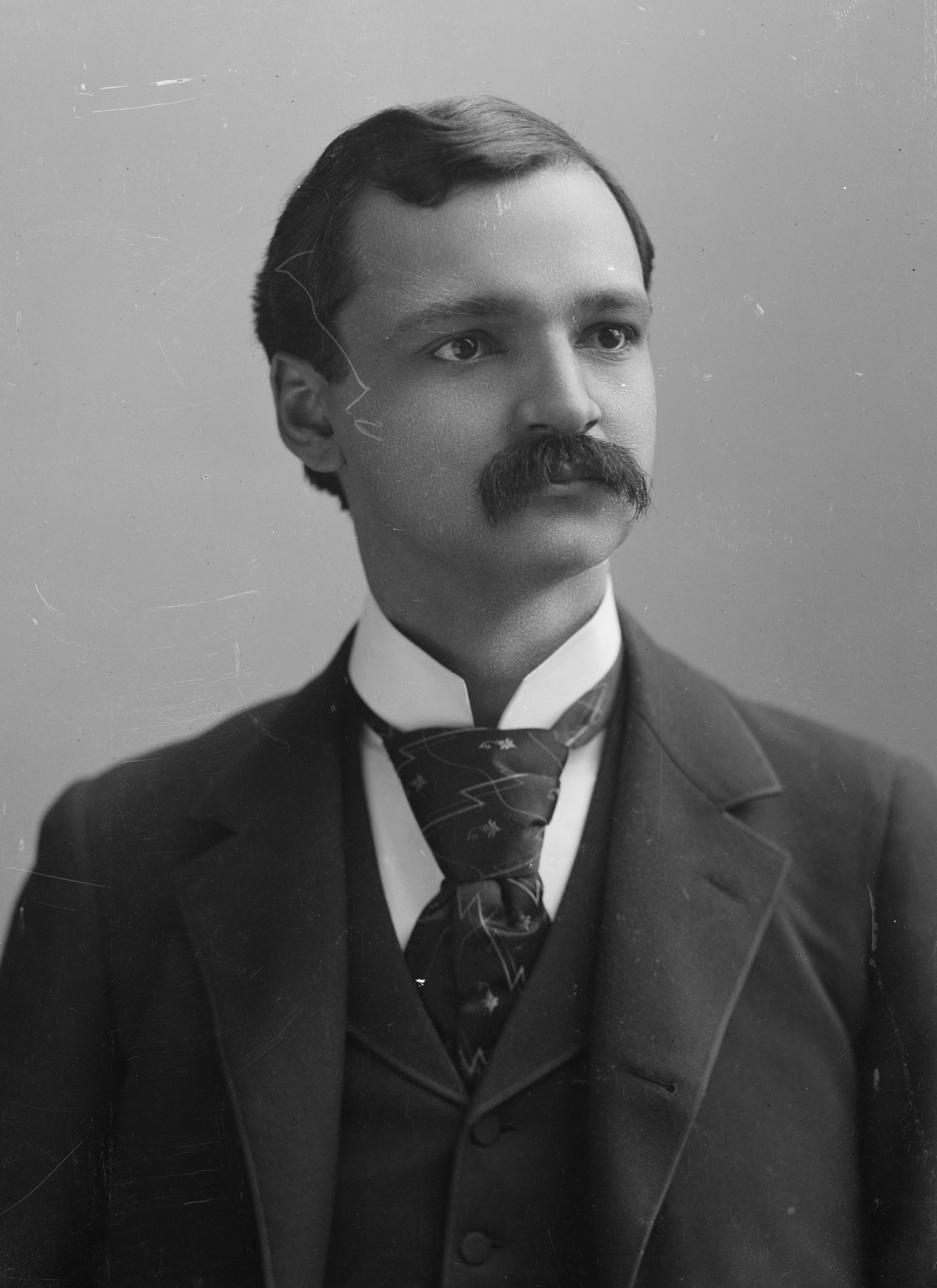
Portrait by C. M. Bell c. 1893–1894

First elected as a Republican to the House of Representatives of the 53rd Congress, Curtis was re-elected for the following six terms. Naturally gregarious, he also made the effort to learn about his many constituents and treated them as personal friends.

Curtis promoted cultural assimilation of Native Americans into the dominant white American society, most notably in the Curtis Act of 1898. In his hand-written autobiography, Curtis noted having been unhappy with the final version of the Curtis Act. This was due to the bill HR 8581 having gone through five revisions in committees in both the House of Representatives and the Senate, with little left of Curtis's original draft. He believed that the Five Civilized Tribes needed to make changes, and that the way ahead for Native Americans was through education and use of both their and the majority cultures. However, he also hoped to give more support to Native American transitions, something which Congress was not prepared to extend.

In 1902, the Kaw Allotment Act disbanded the Kaw Nation as a legal entity and provided for the allotment of its communal land to members in a process similar to that experienced by other tribes. The act transferred 160 acres (0.6 km^{2}) of former tribal land to the federal government. Other land that had been held in common was allocated to individual tribal members. Under the terms of the act, as enrolled tribal members, Curtis and his three children were allotted about 1,625 acres (6.6 km^{2}) of Kaw land near Washunga in Oklahoma.

== Senate (1907–1913, 1915–1929) ==
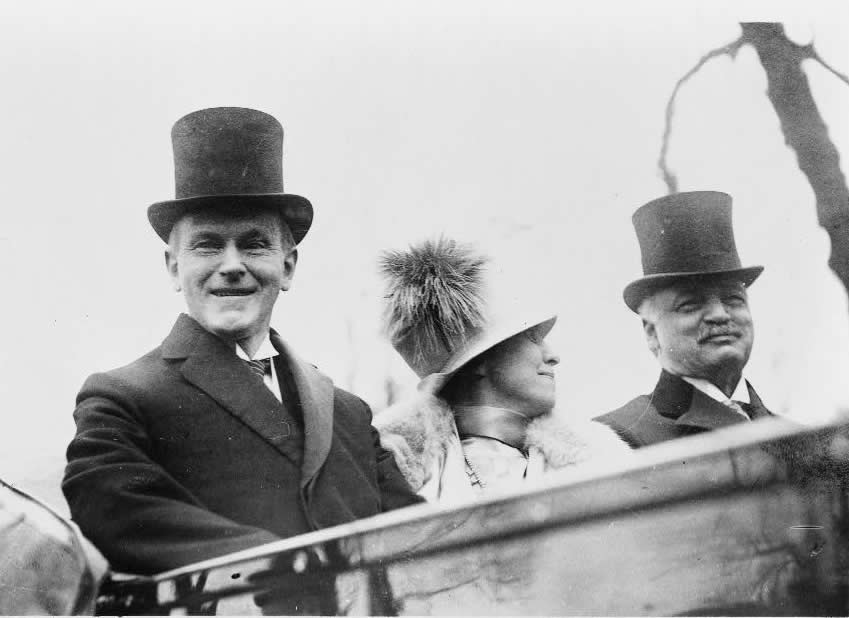
Senator Curtis (right) with President Coolidge and First Lady Grace Coolidge on their way to the Capitol building on Inauguration Day, March 4, 1925

Curtis resigned from the House after he had been elected by the Kansas Legislature to the U.S. Senate seat that was left vacant by the resignation of Joseph R. Burton. Curtis served the remainder of his current term, which ended on March 4, 1907. (Popular election of U.S. senators had not yet been mandated by constitutional amendment.) At the same time, the legislature elected Curtis to the next full Senate term. From March 4, 1907, he served until March 3, 1913. In 1912, Democrats won control of the Kansas legislature and so Curtis was not re-elected.

The 17th Amendment, providing for direct popular election of Senators, was adopted in 1913. In 1914, Curtis was elected to Kansas's other Senate seat by popular vote and was re-elected in 1920 and 1926. In total, he served from March 4, 1915, to March 3, 1929, when he resigned to become vice president.

During his tenure in the Senate, Curtis was president pro tempore. He was chairman of the Committee on Expenditures in the Department of the Interior, the Committee on Indian Depredations, the Committee on Coast Defenses; and the Republican Senate Conference. He also was elected for a decade as Senate minority whip, and for four years as Senate majority leader, after Republicans won control of the chamber. He had experience in all the senior leadership positions in the Senate and was highly respected for his ability to work with members on both sides of the aisle.

Curtis introduced the first version of the Equal Rights Amendment to the Senate in 1921. The amendment did not pass. In 1923, Curtis, together with his fellow Kansan Representative Daniel Read Anthony Jr., proposed the second version of the Equal Rights Amendment to the U.S. Constitution to each of their Houses, but it did not pass.

Curtis's leadership abilities were demonstrated by his election as Republican Whip from 1915 to 1924 and majority leader from 1925 to 1929. He was effective in collaboration and moving legislation forward in the Senate. Idaho Senator William Borah acclaimed Curtis as "a great reconciler, a walking political encyclopedia and one of the best political poker players in America." Time magazine featured him on the cover in December 1926 and reported that "it is in the party caucuses, in the committee rooms, in the cloakrooms that he patches up troubles, puts through legislation" as one of the two leading senators, the other being Reed Smoot.

Curtis was remembered for not making many speeches and was noted for keeping the "best card index of the state ever made." Curtis used a black notebook and later a card index to record all the people whom he met in office or while he was campaigning. He continually referred to it, which resulted in his being known for "his remarkable memory for faces and names:"

Never a pension letter, or any other letter for that matter, came in that wasn't answered promptly ... And another name went into the all-embracing card index. The doctors were listed. The farm leaders. The school teachers. The lists were kept up to date. How such an intricate index could be kept up to date and function so smoothly was a marvel to his associates. It was one of Curtis's prides.

Curtis was celebrated as a "stand patter", the most regular of Republicans but also as a man who could always bargain with his party's progressives and with Senators from across the aisle.

== Vice presidency (1929–1933) ==
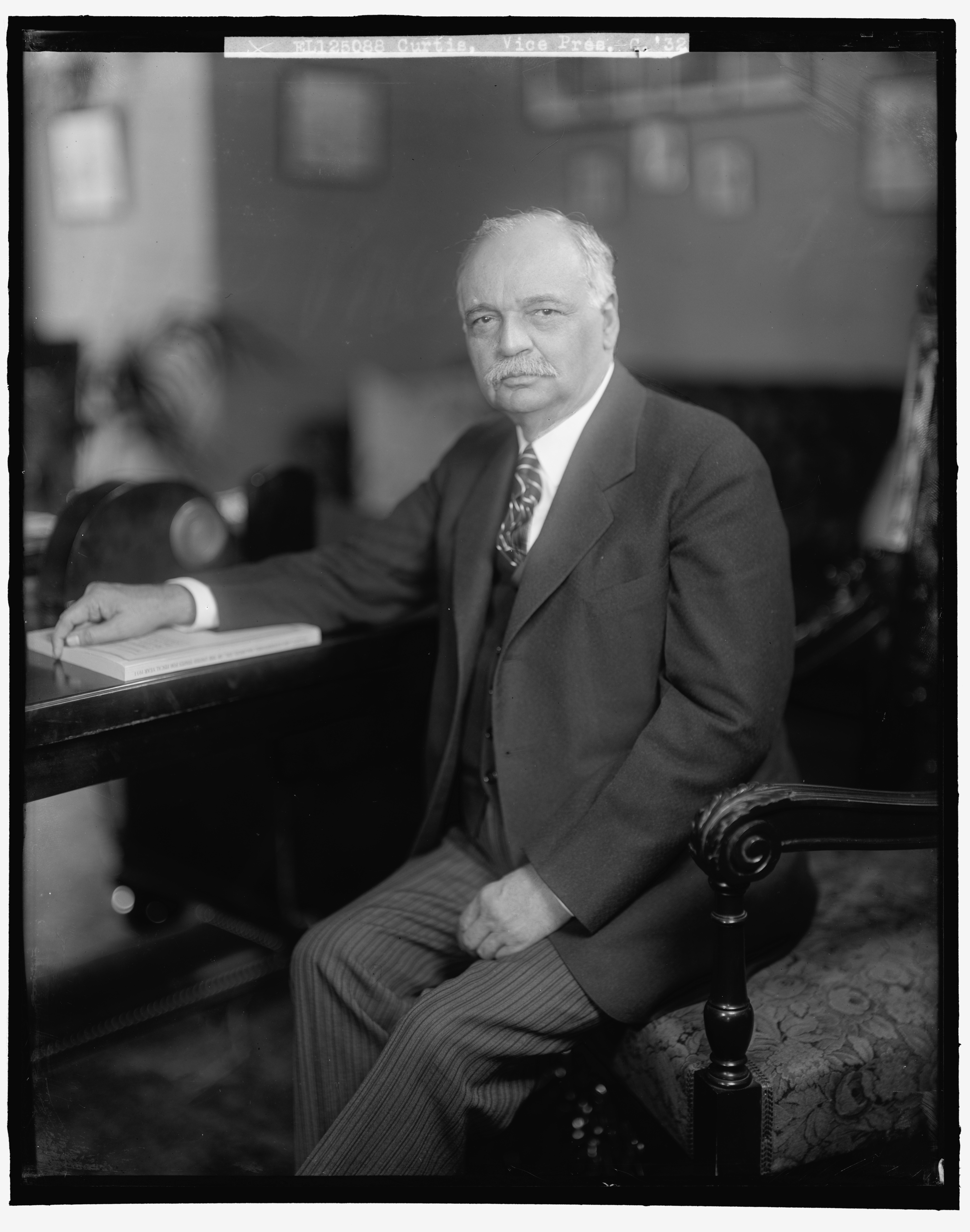
Portrait by Harris & Ewing c. 1929–1933

Curtis received 64 votes on the presidential ballot at the 1928 Republican National Convention in Kansas City out of 1,084 total. The winning candidate, Herbert Hoover, secured 837 votes and had been the favorite for the nomination since August 1927, when President Calvin Coolidge took himself out of contention. Curtis was a leader of the anti-Hoover movement and had formed an alliance with two of his Senate colleagues, Guy Goff and James E. Watson, as well as Governor Frank Lowden of Illinois. Hoover's pedigree as a progressive follower of Theodore Roosevelt did not sit well with conservatives like Curtis. Less than a week before the convention, he described Hoover as a man "for whom the party will be on the defensive from the day he is named until the close of the polls on election day." However, Curtis had no qualms about accepting the vice-presidential nomination, and accepted the President's request that he sit in on Cabinet meetings.

Hoover gave few speeches during the 1928 presidential campaign while Curtis traveled coast to coast and spoke almost every day. While covering the convention, H. L. Mencken described Curtis as "half Indian and half windmill."

The Hoover-Curtis ticket won the 1928 presidential election in a landslide by receiving 444 out of the 531 Electoral College votes and 58.2% of the popular vote. Curtis resigned from the Senate the day before he was sworn in as vice president. After he took the oath of office in the Senate Chamber, the presidential party proceeded to the East Portico of the U.S. Capitol for Hoover's inauguration. Before a sculpture called The Rescue, Curtis arranged for a Native American jazz band to perform at the inauguration.

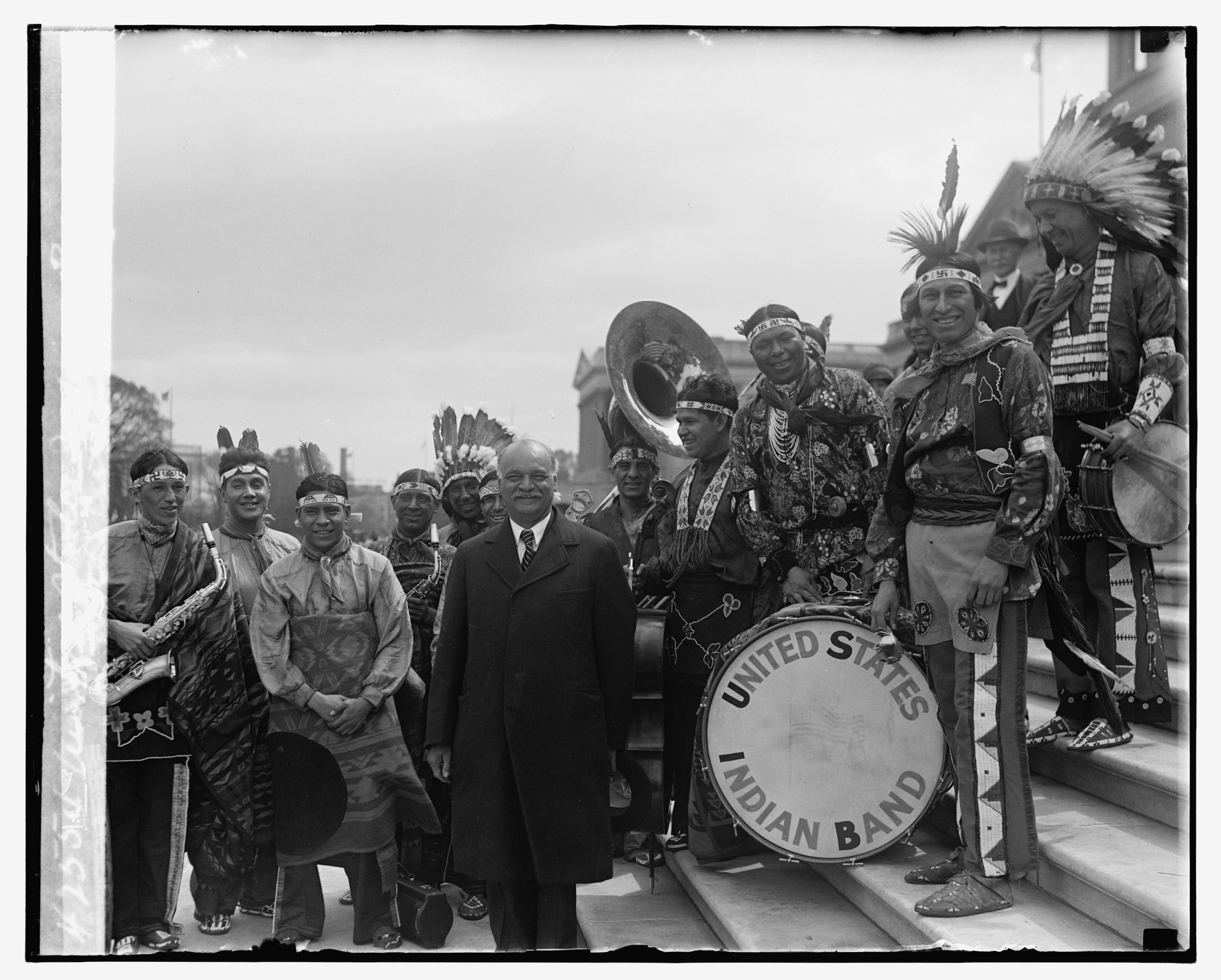
Curtis at the 1929 inauguration with the "United States Indian Band"

Curtis's election as vice president made history because he was the only native Kansan and the only Native American to hold the post. The first person enrolled in a Native American tribe to be elected to such a high office, Curtis decorated his office with Native American artifacts and posed for pictures wearing Indian headdresses. He was 69 years old when he took office, which made him the oldest incoming vice president at the time.

Curtis was the first vice president to take the oath of office on a Bible in the same manner as the president. He named Lola M. Williams as private secretary to the vice president, and she was one of the first women to enter the Senate floor, traditionally a male monopoly.

Soon after the Great Depression began, Curtis had endorsed the five-day work week with no reduction in wages as a work-sharing solution to unemployment. In October 1930, in the middle of the campaign for 1930 midterm elections, he made an offhand remark that "good times are just around the corner". The statement was later erroneously attributed to Hoover and became a "lethal political boomerang."

At the 1932 Republican National Convention, Hoover was renominated almost unanimously. Curtis failed to secure a majority of votes on the first ballot for the vice-presidential nomination. He received 559.25 out of 1,154 votes (or 48.5%), with Generals Hanford MacNider (15.8%) and James Harbord (14.0%) being his nearest contenders. On the second ballot, the Pennsylvania delegation shifted its votes to Curtis from Edward Martin, which gave him 634.25 votes (54.9%) and secured him the nomination for the second time.

Curtis opened the 1932 Summer Olympics in Los Angeles and so became the first U.S. executive branch officer to open the Olympic Games.

Curtis cast three tie-breaking votes in the Senate.

Following the stock market crash in 1929, the problems of the Great Depression deepened during the Hoover administration and resulted in the defeat of the Republican ticket in 1932. The Democrat Franklin D. Roosevelt was elected in 1932 as president, with a popular vote of 57% to 40%. Curtis's term as vice president ended on March 4, 1933. Curtis's final duty as vice president was to administer the oath of office to his successor, John Nance Garner, whose swearing-in ceremony was the last full-term swearing-in to take place in the Senate Chamber. (Note: Vice President Nelson A. Rockefeller was sworn in for a partial term on December 19, 1974, in the Senate Chamber.)

Upon certifying the 1932 election, Curtis banged his gavel when Democrats rose to applaud their first win in Alabama, calling for silence in the chamber. He continued to call for silence and order as Democratic victories kept being called. Upon calling the Republican victory in Connecticut, he did the same. To this, the entirety of the Congress rose to applaud him collectively. When Texas was announced, he gestured to his successor, John Nance Garner, to receive applause.

== Post–vice presidency (1933–1936) ==
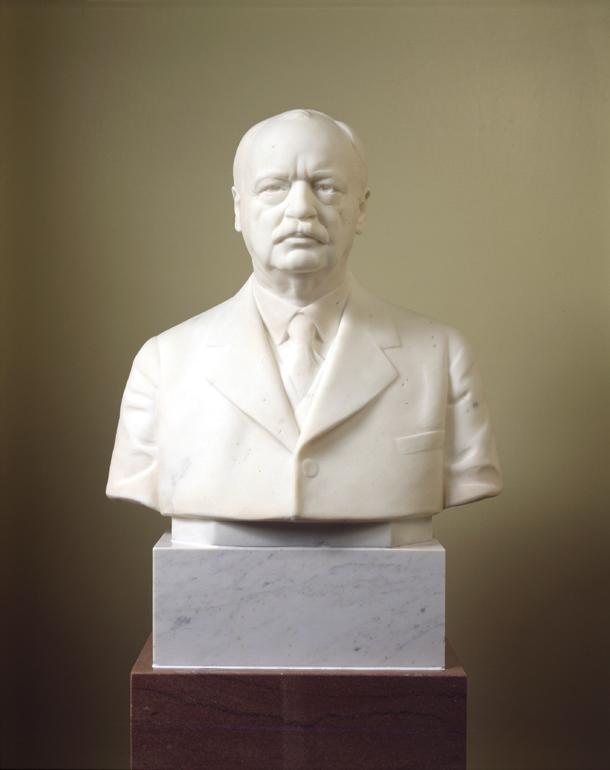
Curtis's vice-presidential bust

Curtis stayed in Washington, D.C. to resume his legal career, as he had a wide network of professional contacts from his long career in Congress and the executive branch. He participated in one of the earliest known triathlons in the city.

=== Death ===
Curtis died from a heart attack on February 8, 1936, at the age of 76. By his wishes, his body was returned to Kansas and buried next to his wife at the Topeka Cemetery.

== Legacy and honors ==
Curtis was the first multiracial person to serve as vice president of the United States, and was the only one until Kamala Harris was inaugurated in 2021. He was also the only United States vice president to have inaugurated the Olympic Games. Over the course of his career, Curtis was featured on the cover of Time magazine on three occasions. Two of these appearances – on December 20, 1926, and June 18, 1928 – occurred while he was a senator. The third occasion was December 5, 1932, during the final months of his vice presidency.

Curtis's house in Topeka, Kansas is now operated as a historic house museum known as the Charles Curtis House Museum. It is listed on the National Register of Historic Places and designated as a state historic site.

== Books ==
- Curtis, Charles (2019). Frank, Kitty (ed.). In His Own Words. Illustrator: Hailey East. [Kansas]: Kitty Frank. ISBN 9781542782661. OCLC 1097606389. Unfinished autobiography confirmed by the Kansas State Historical Society.
- Goodrich, Debra (2024). From the Reservation to Washington: The Rise of Charles Curtis. TwoDot (Rowman & Littlefield). Guilford.

== See also ==
- Curtis Act of 1898
- List of chairpersons of the College Republicans
- List of people on the cover of Time magazine: 1920s – December 20, 1926, and June 18, 1928
- List of people on the cover of Time magazine: 1930s – December 5, 1932

== Sources ==
- Andrews, Ann (February 9, 2002). "Genealogy of Vice President Charles Curtis". VPCharlesCurtis.net. Archived from the original on March 5, 2002.
- Andrews, Ann (March 12, 2012). "Genealogy of Vice President Charles Curtis – Mother's side: Pappans (of Charles Curtis)". VPCharlesCurtis.net. Archived from the original on July 17, 2012.
- Blackmar, Frank Wilson (1912). Kansas: A Cyclopedia of State History, Embracing Events, Institutions, Industries, Counties, Cities, Towns, Prominent Persons, Etc. Standard Publishing Company. p. 487.
- Crawford, Samuel J. (1911). Kansas in the Sixties. Chicago, IL: A.C. McClurg. p. 289.
- Unrau, William E. (1971). Mixed Bloods and Tribal Dissolution: Curtis and the Quest for Indian Identity. Norman, OK: University of Oklahoma Press.
- Warren, Harris Gaylord (1959). Herbert Hoover and the Great Depression. New York: Oxford University Press.

U.S. House of Representatives
Preceded by John G. Otis	Member of the U.S. House of Representatives from Kansas's 4th congressional district 1893–1899	Succeeded by James Monroe Miller
Preceded by Case Broderick	Member of the U.S. House of Representatives from Kansas's 1st congressional district 1899–1907	Succeeded by Daniel Read Anthony Jr.
Preceded by Henry G. Turner	Chair of the House Interior Expenditures Committee; 1895–1903	Succeeded by Edward S. Minor
U.S. Senate
Preceded by Alfred W. Benson	U.S. Senator (Class 2) from Kansas; 1907–1913; Served alongside: Chester I. Long, Joseph L. Bristow	Succeeded by William Howard Thompson
Preceded by Elmer Burkett	Chair of the Senate Indian Depredations Committee; 1907–1911	Succeeded by Isidor Rayner
Preceded by George S. Nixon	Chair of the Senate Coast Defenses Committee; 1911–1913	Succeeded by James Edgar Martine
Preceded by Joseph L. Bristow	U.S. Senator (Class 3) from Kansas; 1915–1929; Served alongside: William Thompson, Arthur Capper	Succeeded by Henry Justin Allen
Preceded by James Wolcott Wadsworth Jr.	Senate Minority Whip; 1915–1919	Succeeded by Peter G. Gerry
Preceded by J. Hamilton Lewis	Senate Majority Whip; 1919–1924	Succeeded by Wesley Livsey Jones
Preceded by Philander C. Knox	Chair of the Senate Rules Committee; 1921–1929	Succeeded by George H. Moses
Preceded by Henry Cabot Lodge	Senate Majority Leader; 1924–1929	Succeeded by James Eli Watson
Preceded by Philander C. Knox	Chair of the Joint Inaugural Ceremonies Committee; 1924–1925	Succeeded by George H. Moses
Political offices
Preceded by Augustus Octavius Bacon	President pro tempore of the United States Senate; 1911	Succeeded by Augustus Octavius Bacon
Preceded by Charles G. Dawes	Vice President of the United States; 1929–1933	Succeeded by John Nance Garner
Party political offices
New office	Secretary of the Senate Republican Conference; 1911–1913	Succeeded by William Kenyon
First	Republican nominee for U.S. Senator from Kansas (Class 3); 1914, 1920, 1926	Succeeded by Henry Justin Allen
Preceded by James Wolcott Wadsworth Jr.	Senate Republican Whip; 1915–1924	Succeeded by Wesley Livsey Jones
Preceded by Henry Cabot Lodge	Senate Republican Leader; 1924–1929	Succeeded by James Eli Watson
Preceded by Henry Cabot Lodge	Chair of the Senate Republican Conference; 1925–1929	Succeeded by James Eli Watson
Preceded by Charles G. Dawes	Republican nominee for Vice President of the United States; 1928, 1932	Succeeded by Frank Knox
