= White Plume =

Kaw chief (d. 1838)

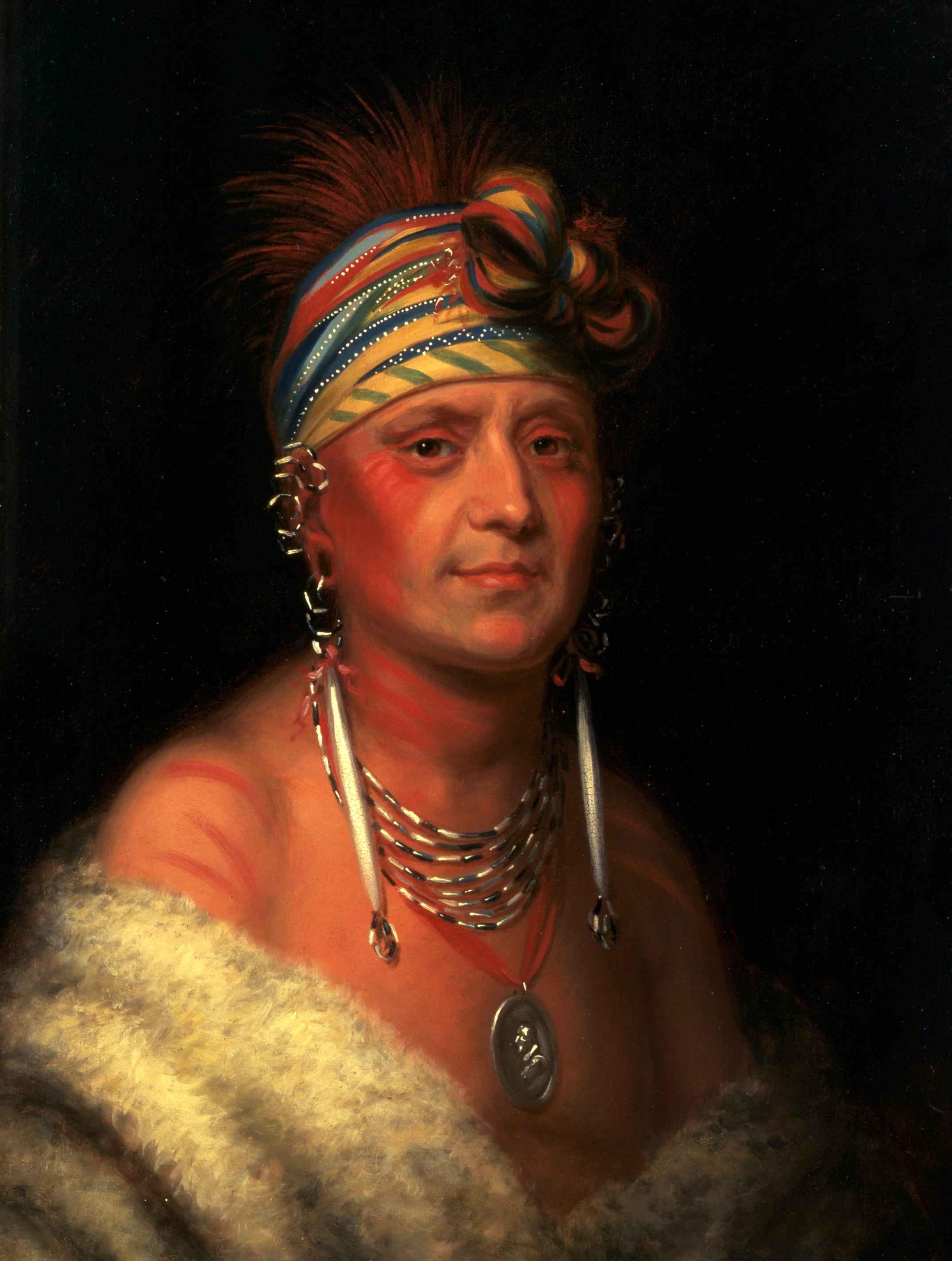
Monchousia (White Plume), 1822, oil on panel, by Charles Bird King

White Plume (ca. 1765—1838), also known as Nom-pa-wa-rah, Manshenscaw, and Monchousia, was a chief of the Kaw (Kansa, Kanza) Indigenous American tribe. He signed a treaty in 1825 ceding millions of acres of Kaw land to the United States. He was the great-great-grandfather of Charles Curtis, 31st Vice President of the United States.

== Early life and family ==
White Plume was born about 1765. The Kaw tribe at that time occupied lands in what became the states of Kansas and Missouri and numbered about 1500 persons. White Plume married a daughter of the Osage Chief Pawhuska. This marriage may have been important in establishing friendly relations between the closely related Kaws and Osage.

White Plume had five children. His three sons all died when young men. His two daughters, Hunt Jimmy (b. ca. 1800) and Wyhesee (b. ca. 1802) married the French traders Louis Gonville and Joseph James. Until the United States acquired Louisiana Territory from France in 1803, the Kaw subsisted primarily on buffalo hunting with only limited agriculture. They were dependent on selling furs and buffalo robes to French traders, such as the powerful Chouteau family, to acquire European goods such as guns. White Plume lived to see the traditional lifestyle of the Kaws become increasingly unsustainable. He attempted to meet the challenges facing the Kaws by cooperation with the U.S. government.

== Treaties ==
White Plume was first written about as one of the Kaw signatories to an 1815 treaty with the United States. With his daughters married to French traders, White Plume was identified by American officials as more progressive—in their minds—than his leadership rivals among the Kaws. In 1821 he was invited by Indian Superintendent William Clark (of Lewis and Clark) to visit Washington, D.C., as a member of a delegation of Native American leaders. The group met with President James Monroe and other American officials, visited New York City, Baltimore, and Philadelphia, and performed war dances on the White House Lawn and at the residence of the French Minister. The artist Charles Bird King painted a portrait of White Plume. He was given two silver epaulettes as a sign that the U. S. government accepted him as the principal Kaw chief. In reality, however, he never had authority over most members of the tribe.

White Plume came back from Washington convinced that the future of the Kaw, and his own future, was accommodation with the United States. Already eastern Indians were being expelled from the east and squatting on Kaw lands. The Missouri River was a highway to fur trappers and traders heading for the Rocky Mountains. In 1822 the first wagons crossed through Kaw lands from Missouri to New Mexico on the Santa Fe Trail. Many Euro-Americans, including the missionary Isaac McCoy, saw Kansas as the place in which all the dispossessed eastern Indians could be confined to an Indian state.

In 1825, White Plume was the principal Kaw chief signing a treaty that ceded 18 million acres (73,000 km^{2}) to the United States in exchange for annuities of 3,500 dollars per year for 20 years plus livestock and assistance to convert the Kaw into full-time farmers. What was left to the Kaw was a pittance of land thirty miles wide extending westward into the Great Plains from the Kansas River valley. To win support for the treaty from the increasingly important mixed bloods, each of 23 mixed blood children of French/Kaw parents received a section of land on the north bank of the Kansas River. (See Half-Breed Tracts). The immense land grab in the 1825 treaty, plus a similar treaty signed by the government with the Osage, opened up Kansas to the relocation of eastern Indian tribes. The U.S. would squeeze the Kaw into ever smaller territories. In defense of White Plume, much of the land he ceded was already lost to the Kaw and was being occupied by eastern Native Americans or White settlers. White Plume probably also foresaw that the Kaw would have to learn to live on much reduced territories and change their emphasis from hunting and fur trading to agriculture. Thus, he chose cooperation as his policy.

== Leadership ==
When George Sibley visited the Kaws in 1811, they were living in a single prosperous village of 128 two and three-family bark lodges on the site of present-day Manhattan, Kansas. The favoritism, however, shown by the United States to White Plume and the mixed bloods contributed to rivalries for leadership. In the 1820s, the Kaw split into four factions. Not accepting White Plume's leadership, the three conservative factions continued to live in villages near Manhattan. White Plume and his supporters settled downstream near the Kaw Agency headquarters established near Williamstown, Kansas, in 1827.

The increasing problems of the Kaw were amplified by smallpox epidemics that swept through the tribe in 1827-1828 and 1831-1832 killing nearly 500 members of the tribe including White Plume's wife and two of his sons.

A Methodist missionary, William Johnson arrived in 1830 at the Williamstown agency to begin a school for Kaw and mixed-blood children. The Kaw Agency was a microcosm of the "careless, indeed illusive" efforts of the U.S. government's efforts to make Christians and farmers of Indians such as the Kaw who had little desire to be either. Indian Agents, appointed by the government were often corrupt or incompetent. Most agents found reason to be absent from the agency for extended periods of time. Also, in accordance with the treaty, White farmers, teachers, missionaries, both Roman Catholic and Protestant, and a blacksmith lived near the agency to "civilize" the Kaw. For a time, the farmer was Daniel Morgan Boone, son of the famous scout, Daniel Boone. His son, born here August 22, 1828, was the second white child born in Kansas. The Chouteau family established a trading post across the river from the Agency to provide goods to the Kaw in exchange for buffalo robes and furs. An illicit whiskey trade flourished.

A grateful U.S. government built a stone house for White Plume near the agency, but he lived in a traditional lodge because he said the house had "too much fleas." Many of the mixed bloods also lived near the agency, as did a number of French voyageurs who were accustomed to life on the frontier. As the author Washington Irving said, "the old French houses engaged in the Indian trade had gathered round them a train of dependents, mongrel Indians, and mongrel Frenchmen, who had intermarried with Indians."

White Plume was a prominent personality on the frontier in the 1830s and travelers often called on him. The painter George Catlin described him as "a very urbane and hospitable man of good, portly size, speaking some English, and making himself good company for all persons who travel through his country and have the good luck to shake his liberal and hospitable hand." Catlin regretted that he did not have the opportunity to paint White Plume's portrait.

In his last years, it appears that White Plume, perhaps disillusioned with the results of his accommodation policy, "returned to the old Indian habits." A missionary reported in 1838 that he died while on an autumn hunt.
