= Kaw City, Oklahoma =

- City
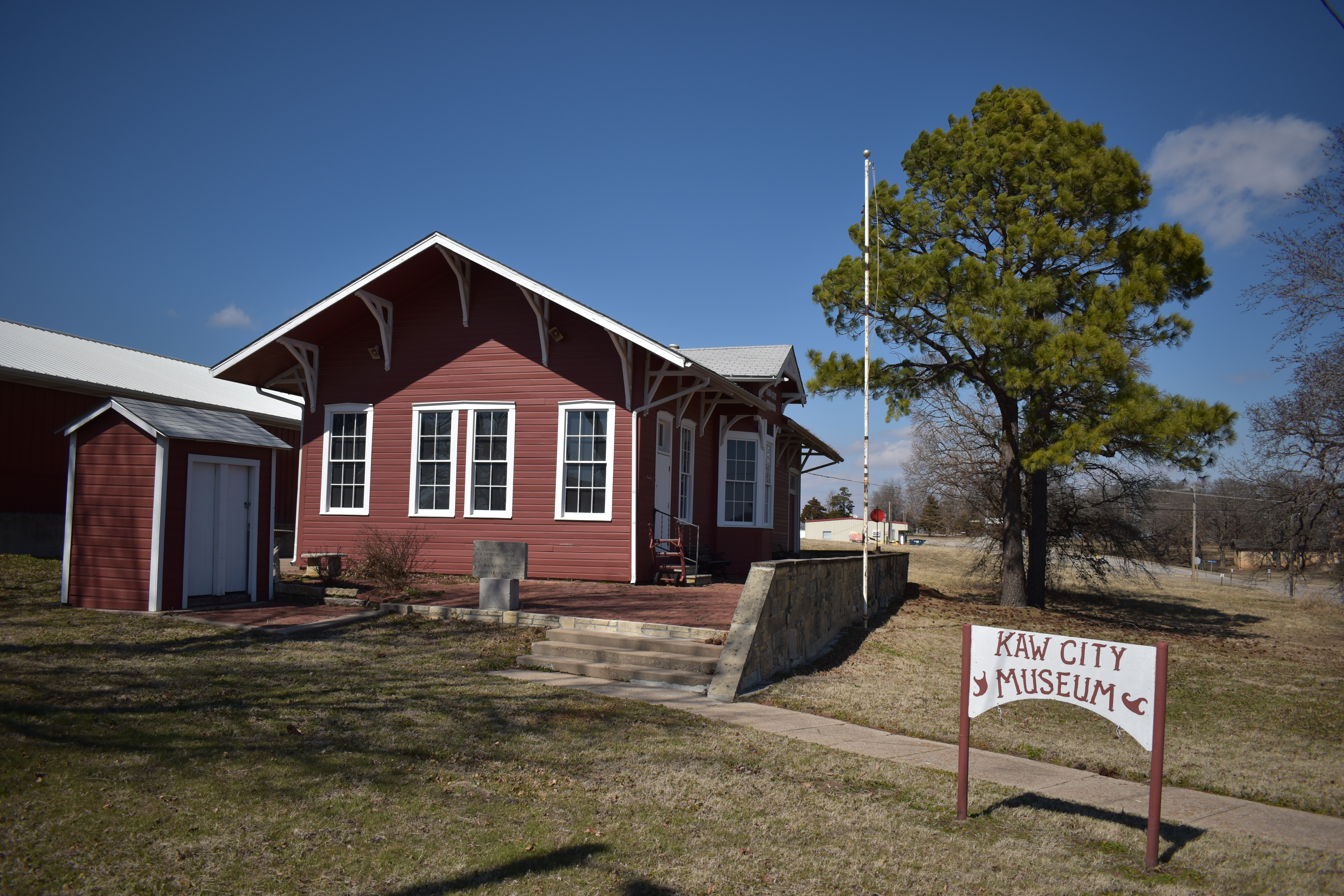
- The 1903 Santa Fe Depot, moved before the original townsite was flooded, now part of the Kaw City Museum.

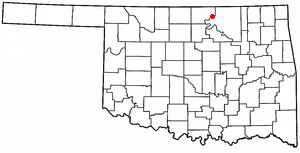
- Location of Kaw City, Oklahoma
- Coordinates: 36°46′03″N 96°52′00″W
- Country: United States
- State: Oklahoma
- County: Kay

Area
  - Total: 6.12 sq mi (15.85 km^{2})
  - Land: 3.01 sq mi (7.80 km^{2})
  - Water: 3.11 sq mi (8.05 km^{2})
- Elevation: 1,175 ft (358 m)

Population (2020)
  - Total: 325
  - Density: 108.0/sq mi (41.68/km^{2})
- Time zone: UTC-6 (Central (CST))
  - Summer (DST): UTC-5 (CDT)
- ZIP code: 74641
- Area code: 580
- FIPS code: 40-38800
- GNIS feature ID: 2410168
- Website: kawcityok.gov

Kaw City is a city in eastern Kay County, Oklahoma, United States. The population was 325 as of the 2020 United States census. Kaw City was named for the Kanza Indians, called the Kaw by locals.

== History ==
In 1902, the original Kaw City was founded, prior to Oklahoma statehood, as a farming community in the fertile oxbow bend of the Arkansas River. Kaw City was across the river from the Kaw Indian reservation and the Kaw Agency. By statehood in 1907, it had 486 inhabitants. Although the original town site is now inundated by the waters of Kaw Lake, the old town was quite a busy place.

It became a booming oil town in 1919, when 'black gold' was discovered in nearby Kay County and the present Osage Nation reservation. The population jumped from 627 in 1920 to 1,001 in 1930. It even had a very popular four-story hotel filled with one of the world's rarest art collections. Laura A. Clubb, owner of the collection and wife of a local rancher, later donated her collection to Philbrook Art Museum.

The majority of the town was overcome by a (weather-related) flood in 1923, and then devastated again by the Great Depression.

In the late 1960s, the Army Corps of Engineers constructed Kaw Dam on the Arkansas River just south of the original Kaw City site. It then went underwater permanently in 1976, when the gates of the Kaw Dam closed and turned that particular area of the Arkansas River into Kaw Lake. Dave Morgan, a banker and oilman in nearby Blackwell, Oklahoma loaned the town the money it needed to move two miles to the west, up on a hill by the town's cemetery. The first house was built in the summer of 1969 and first mail delivery was on June 26, 1972. Many buildings in Kaw City, including the old Santa Fe Railroad Depot which is now the Kaw City Museum, were moved to the town's present location, on high ground near the lake. The Santa Fe Railroad Depot is listed on the National Register of Historic Places. The depot is one of only two listed structures that have been moved from their original locations elsewhere in Oklahoma, the other being Will Rogers Homestead near Claremore, which was also moved to make way for a lake. When the water in the lake is exceptionally low, some of the foundations of the old structures can still be seen just above the water.

The Kaw City Cemetery (all headstones and the majority of the caskets) were also moved and given a separate section within Ponca City's IOOF cemetery, west of Conoco just south of Highway 60. The Kaw Indian cemetery located across the Arkansas river in Washunga was moved to Newkirk, Oklahoma.

== Geography ==
Kaw City is located on a peninsula extending into the Kaw Lake impoundment of the Arkansas River. Washunga lies to the north across the lake. Oklahoma State Highway 11 passes through the community.

According to the United States Census Bureau, the city has a total area of 5.5 square miles (14 km^{2}), of which 2.7 square miles (7.0 km^{2}) is land and 2.8 square miles (7.3 km^{2}) (51.26%) is water.

== Demographics ==
Historical population
Census	Pop.	Note	%±
1910	595		—
1920	627		5.4%
1930	1,001		59.6%
1940	809		−19.2%
1950	561		−30.7%
1960	457		−18.5%
1970	283		−38.1%
1980	283		0.0%
1990	314		11.0%
2000	372		18.5%
2010	375		0.8%
2020	325		−13.3%
U.S. Decennial Census

=== 2020 census ===
As of the 2020 census, Kaw City had a population of 325. The median age was 55.5 years, 16.6% of residents were under the age of 18, and 32.0% were 65 years of age or older. For every 100 females there were 105.7 males, and for every 100 females age 18 and over there were 106.9 males age 18 and over.

0% of residents lived in urban areas, while 100.0% lived in rural areas.

There were 149 households in Kaw City, of which 25.5% had children under the age of 18 living in them. Of all households, 47.0% were married-couple households, 21.5% were households with a male householder and no spouse or partner present, and 19.5% were households with a female householder and no spouse or partner present. About 20.8% of all households were made up of individuals and 10.1% had someone living alone who was 65 years of age or older.

There were 243 housing units, of which 38.7% were vacant. Among occupied housing units, 83.9% were owner-occupied and 16.1% were renter-occupied. The homeowner vacancy rate was 0.8% and the rental vacancy rate was 25.0%.

Racial composition as of the 2020 census
Race	Percent
White	75.4%
Black or African American	0%
American Indian and Alaska Native	8.0%
Asian	0%
Native Hawaiian and Other Pacific Islander	0%
Some other race	0.3%
Two or more races	16.3%
Hispanic or Latino (of any race)	1.8%

=== 2000 census ===
As of the 2000 census, there were 372 people, 159 households, and 109 families residing in the city. The population density was 137.9 inhabitants per square mile (53.2/km^{2}). There were 210 housing units at an average density of 77.8 per square mile (30.0/km^{2}). The racial makeup of the city was 77.96% White, 0.27% African American, 20.16% Native American, 0.54% from other races, and 1.08% from two or more races. Hispanic or Latino of any race were 3.23% of the population.

There were 159 households, out of which 27.7% had children under the age of 18 living with them, 52.2% were married couples living together, 14.5% had a female householder with no husband present, and 31.4% were non-families. 25.8% of all households were made up of individuals, and 14.5% had someone living alone who was 65 years of age or older. The average household size was 2.34 and the average family size was 2.82.

In the city, the population was spread out, with 26.9% under the age of 18, 6.2% from 18 to 24, 22.6% from 25 to 44, 25.8% from 45 to 64, and 18.5% who were 65 years of age or older. The median age was 39 years. For every 100 females, there were 74.6 males. For every 100 females age 18 and over, there were 82.6 males.

The median income for a household in the city was $26,146, and the median income for a family was $31,042. Males had a median income of $30,000 versus $17,917 for females. The per capita income for the city was $15,091. About 9.3% of families and 12.7% of the population were below the poverty line, including 16.5% of those under age 18 and 21.9% of those age 65 or over.

== Arts and culture ==
The Kaw City Museum is housed in the town’s 1902 train depot, and has exhibits relating to the history of the area.

The Kanza Museum and Education Resource Center showcases tribal art and historical artifacts of the Kaw Nation.

As to outdoor art, the Consultant of the SouthWind Statue is on the north side of SH-11, on the west side of Kaw Tribal headquarters; the Deer Jumping Fence Sculpture is on the south side of SH-11, near City Hall.

The First United Methodist Church is known for its large stained glass windows, oil paintings, and a Kilgren Pipe Organ.

== Government ==
The headquarters of the Kaw Nation is located in Kaw City.

== Education ==
It is in the Shidler Public Schools school district.
