= Kaw Lake =

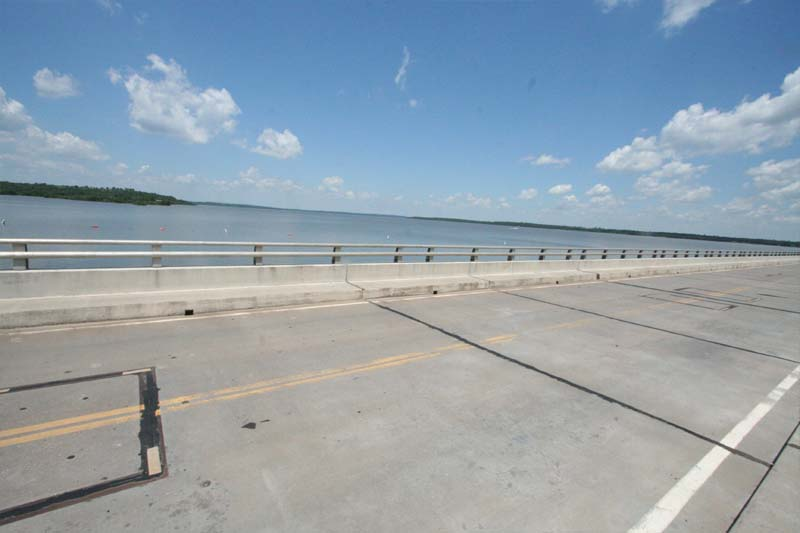
- Looking North from the road over the dam across the Arkansas River July 14, 2007

- Location within Oklahoma Location within the United States
- Location: Kay / Osage counties, Oklahoma, US
- Coordinates: 36°46′15″N 96°50′01″W
- Lake type: reservoir
- Basin countries: United States
- Surface area: 17,000 acres (69 km^{2})
- Water volume: 428,000 acre⋅ft (528,000,000 m^{3})
- Shore length^{1}: 168 mi (270 km)
- Surface elevation: 1,010 ft (310 m)
- Settlements: Kaw City, Oklahoma Ponca City, Oklahoma
- ^{1} Shore length is not a well-defined measure.

Kaw Lake is a reservoir completed in 1976 in the northern reaches of the U.S. state of Oklahoma, near Kaw City which is located on a hill overlooking the lake. The lake is approximately 8 miles (13 km) east of Ponca City. Newkirk is 6 miles (9.7 km) west of the upper end of the lake.

Kaw Dam is 9,466 feet (2,885 m) long and 121 feet (37 m) above the stream bed. The dam lies 654 miles (1,053 km) above the mouth of the Arkansas River. The top of the flood control pool is 1,044.5 feet (318.4 m), while the normal operating level is 1,010 feet.

The Arkansas River below the dam at Kaw Lake, Augest 18th, 2026.

The Reservoir covers approximately 17,040 acres (69 km²). It is the seventh largest lake in Oklahoma by surface area. At normal levels, the lake holds 428,600 acre-feet (528,700,000 m^{3}) of water, the ninth largest lake in capacity in Oklahoma. (See List of lakes in Oklahoma) It lies mostly in Kay County and partially in Osage County.

Kaw Dam was authorized by Congress in the Flood Control Act of 1962. Ground was broken for the dam on May 21, 1966. The original town of Kaw City was covered by the waters of Kaw Lake in 1975. The city was rebuilt about two miles west of the old site during the late 1960s. The dam was completed by the Corps of Engineers in May 1976. The cost of the dam and the lake was $111 million.

The Oklahoma Municipal Power Authority (OMPA), a state governmental agency created in 1981 to provide wholesale electricity to cities and towns in Oklahoma, purchased the substructure of the dam in July 1987 at a cost of $3.8 million and constructed a hydroelectric plant that was completed in September 1989 at a cost of $25 million. Kaw Hydroelectric generates approximately 104 gigawatt hours of energy annually. The generator is nominally rated at 25.6 megawatts at 76 feet (23 m) of gross head with a maximum rating of 36.7 MVA. The plant at Kaw Dam provides power for over 35 municipal electrical systems in Oklahoma and southern Kansas. The project engineer for the Kaw Lake dam was Everette W. Woodham, Jr.

The Corps of Engineers and Camp McFadden offers camping on the west shore of Kaw Lake at Ponca Cove.

The City of Enid began a project in 2020 to lay a 70-mile pipeline to tap Kaw Lake as a municipal water source. The project will transport 10 million gallons of water per day.

== Camp McFadden ==
Camp McFadden is an outdoor recreational area on over 250 acres (1.0 km^{2}) overlooking the west side of Kaw Lake near Ponca City, Oklahoma. Camp McFadden was created in 1927 as a children's camp by Bill McFadden on the Kygar ranch. The camp includes high and low ropes courses, cabins, a lodge with full kitchen, outdoor activities, and RV and tent camping and is used for team building, reunions, youth and church camps, weddings, and getaways. Future plans include a volleyball court, disc golf, softball field, soccer field and archery range. Camp McFadden is a non-profit 501(c)(3).
