= Braman, Oklahoma =

- Town
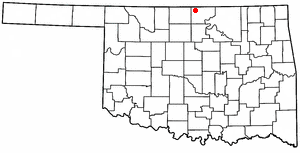
- Location of Braman, Oklahoma
- Coordinates: 36°55′25″N 97°20′09″W
- Country: United States
- State: Oklahoma
- County: Kay

Area
  - Total: 0.20 sq mi (0.51 km^{2})
  - Land: 0.20 sq mi (0.51 km^{2})
  - Water: 0 sq mi (0.00 km^{2})
- Elevation: 1,047 ft (319 m)

Population (2020)
  - Total: 160
  - Density: 817.6/sq mi (315.68/km^{2})
- Time zone: UTC-6 (Central (CST))
  - Summer (DST): UTC-5 (CDT)
- ZIP code: 74632
- Area code: 580
- FIPS code: 40-08450
- GNIS feature ID: 2411719

Braman is a town in Kay County, Oklahoma, United States. The population was 160 at the time of the 2020 Census.

== History ==
Braman was named for railroad developer Dwight Braman, when its post office was first established on April 22, 1898. In that year, the Kansas and Southeastern Railroad—which was bought by the Atchison, Topeka and Santa Fe Railroad (AT&SF) in 1899—built a track from Hunnewell, Kansas to Braman. The following year, the Blackwell and Southern Railway—which was bought by the AT&SF in 1900—continued the line south through Blackwell to Tonkawa. Meanwhile the town, located 5 miles (8.0 km) inside the Kansas-Oklahoma state line, officially incorporated on January 9, 1899. There were 249 residents in 1900, growing to 300 by statehood in 1907.

In 1920, the population was 396 and the local economy was largely based on wheat farming. Oil was discovered nearby during the 1920s, briefly attracting a peak population of nearly five thousand, but the population dropped quickly to 507 in 1930. This was the highest number ever recorded in the census for Braman. It has remained an agricultural center since then.

== Geography ==
According to the United States Census Bureau, Braman has a total area of 0.2 square miles (0.52 km^{2}), all land.

== Demographics ==
Historical population
Census	Pop.	Note	%±
1900	249		—
1910	339		36.1%
1920	396		16.8%
1930	507		28.0%
1940	427		−15.8%
1950	392		−8.2%
1960	336		−14.3%
1970	295		−12.2%
1980	355		20.3%
1990	251		−29.3%
2000	244		−2.8%
2010	217		−11.1%
2020	160		−26.3%
U.S. Decennial Census

=== 2020 census ===
As of the 2020 census, Braman had a population of 160. The median age was 34.3 years. 30.0% of residents were under the age of 18 and 21.9% of residents were 65 years of age or older. For every 100 females there were 131.9 males, and for every 100 females age 18 and over there were 111.3 males age 18 and over.

0.0% of residents lived in urban areas, while 100.0% lived in rural areas.

There were 54 households in Braman, of which 42.6% had children under the age of 18 living in them. Of all households, 50.0% were married-couple households, 27.8% were households with a male householder and no spouse or partner present, and 18.5% were households with a female householder and no spouse or partner present. About 18.6% of all households were made up of individuals and 13.0% had someone living alone who was 65 years of age or older.

There were 89 housing units, of which 39.3% were vacant. The homeowner vacancy rate was 1.7% and the rental vacancy rate was 38.9%.

Racial composition as of the 2020 census
Race	Number	Percent
White	137	85.6%
Black or African American	0	0.0%
American Indian and Alaska Native	9	5.6%
Asian	0	0.0%
Native Hawaiian and Other Pacific Islander	0	0.0%
Some other race	1	0.6%
Two or more races	13	8.1%
Hispanic or Latino (of any race)	6	3.8%

=== 2000 census ===
As of the census of 2000, there were 244 people, 103 households, and 66 families residing in the town. The population density was 1,558.2 inhabitants per square mile (601.6/km^{2}). There were 117 housing units at an average density of 747.2 per square mile (288.5/km^{2}). The racial makeup of the town was 85.66% White, 0.41% African American, 6.56% Native American, and 7.38% from two or more races. Hispanic or Latino of any race were 3.28% of the population.

There were 103 households, out of which 31.1% had children under the age of 18 living with them, 49.5% were married couples living together, 11.7% had a female householder with no husband present, and 35.0% were non-families. 31.1% of all households were made up of individuals, and 7.8% had someone living alone who was 65 years of age or older. The average household size was 2.37 and the average family size was 2.99.

In the town, the population was spread out, with 25.4% under the age of 18, 6.1% from 18 to 24, 26.6% from 25 to 44, 29.5% from 45 to 64, and 12.3% who were 65 years of age or older. The median age was 39 years. For every 100 females, there were 92.1 males. For every 100 females age 18 and over, there were 93.6 males.

The median income for a household in the town was $27,841, and the median income for a family was $33,750. Males had a median income of $23,750 versus $21,667 for females. The per capita income for the town was $17,721. About 3.0% of families and 10.0% of the population were below the poverty line, including 5.0% of those under the age of eighteen and 24.0% of those 65 or over.

== Transportation ==
Braman is served by Interstate 35 and US Route 177.

Braman has freight rail service through Land Rush Rail Corporation ("LRRC"), an affiliate of Farmrail, as replacement for the Blackwell Northern Gateway Railroad which operated the line between 2006 and 2024.

The nearest airfield is Blackwell-Tonkawa Municipal Airport (FAA Identifier: BKN), about 12 miles south, with a 3501’ x 60’ paved runway. Commercial airline service is available at Wichita Dwight D. Eisenhower National Airport, about 58 miles to the north.

== Notable person ==
- Dale DeWitt, the former majority leader of the Oklahoma House of Representatives, resides in Braman.
