= Blackwell and Southern Railway =

Overview
- Headquarters: Guthrie, Oklahoma
- Locale: Oklahoma
- Dates of operation: 1899–1900

Technical
- Track gauge: 4 ft 8 1/2 in (1,435 mm) standard gauge
- Length: 15.95 miles (25.67 km)

The Blackwell and Southern Railway ("B&SR") constructed a rail line running from Braman, Oklahoma to Tonkawa, Oklahoma. The 15.95-mile (25.67 km) route was built in 1899, and sold to the Atchison, Topeka and Santa Fe Railway (AT&SF) in early 1900.

== History ==
=== Kansas and Southeastern Railroad ===
As background, a rail connection had arrived in the town of Hunnewell, Kansas in 1880, giving that locale access to the Kansas City stockyards and beyond. Thus when the separate Kansas and Southeastern Railroad, which had been incorporated in Kansas on August 16, 1897, constructed in 1898 a line from Hunnewell on the Kansas-Oklahoma border south to Braman, about 9.1 miles, Braman became a desirable connection point for other railroads.

=== B&SR ===
Against that framework, The Blackwell and Southern Railway Company was incorporated under the General Laws of the Territory of Oklahoma on June 2, 1899 with its headquarters in Guthrie. Utilizing over $150,000 advanced from the AT&SF, the railway built south from Braman through Blackwell-- which had an east/west railroad connection owned by the Hutchinson and Southern Railway-- and continued on to Tonkawa, 15.95 miles in total. The single-track line was completed on August 7, 1899, and was operated by the AT&SF from its first day.

=== Sale ===
The B&SR was sold to the AT&SF on January 26, 1900. This was just shortly after the AT&SF bought both the Kansas and Southeastern Railroad and the Hutchinson and Southern Railway on December 20, 1899.

=== Subsequent events ===
The Blackwell-to-Tonkawa segment of the line has since been abandoned, but the Blackwell-to-Braman segment is still in use. It is owned by the Blackwell Industrial Authority ("BIA") and the Oklahoma Department of Transportation ("ODOT"). Its long-time operator was the Blackwell Northern Gateway Railroad ("BNG"); but, on February 18, 2025, Land Rush Rail Corporation ("LRRC"), a subsidiary of Farmrail, filed a verified notice of exemption with the Surface Transportation Board, declaring it had entered into a lease agreement with the BIA and ODOT to take over operations of the former BNG trackage.
