= Portland, Kansas =

Unincorporated community in Sumner County, Kansas

Coordinates: 37°04′40″N 97°18′44″W

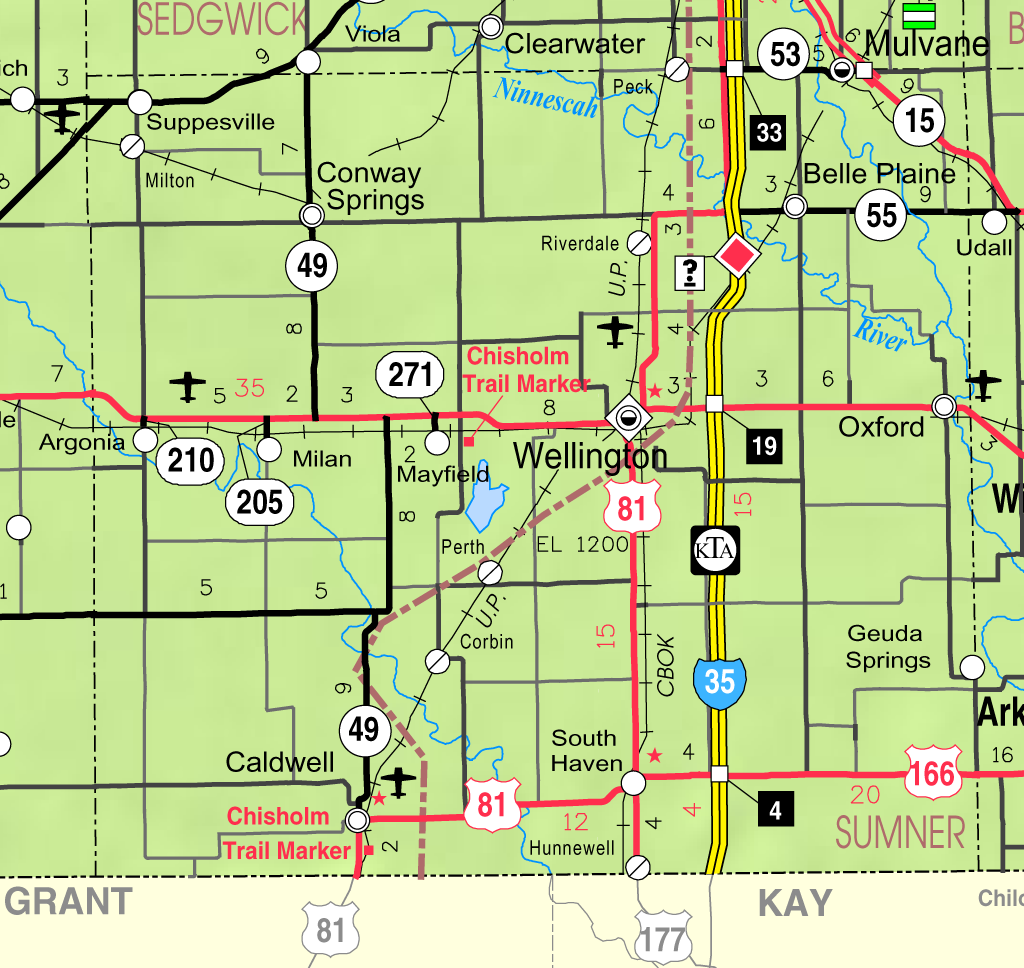
KDOT map of Sumner County (legend)

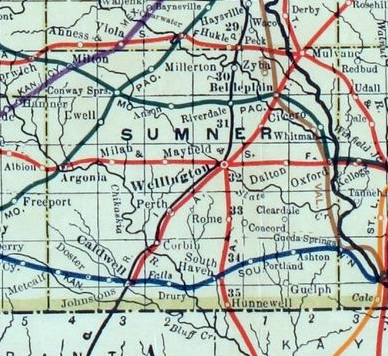
1915 railroad map of Sumner County

Portland is an unincorporated community in Sumner County, Kansas, United States. It is located approximately five miles northeast of South Haven at 1.5 miles north of the intersection of S Hydraulic Rd and U.S. Route 166, adjacent to an abandoned railroad. It is 1.5 miles east of I-35 (Kansas Turnpike).

== History ==
A post office was opened in Portland in 1886, and remained in operation until it was discontinued in 1940.

The Kansas Southwestern Railway previously passed through the community, east to west, from Geuda Springs to South Haven.

== Education ==
The community is served by South Haven USD 509 public school district.
