= Ashton, Kansas =

Unincorporated community in Sumner County, Kansas

Coordinates: 37°04′59″N 97°14′19″W

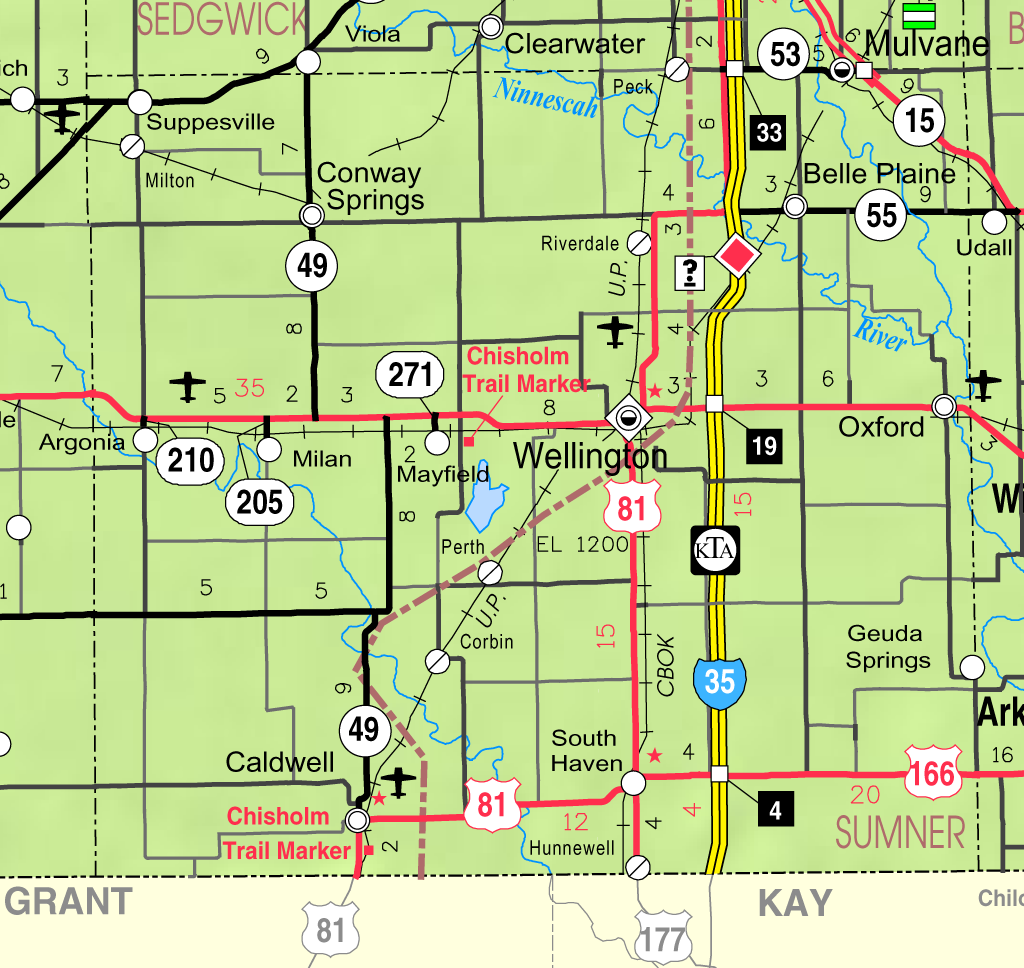
KDOT map of Sumner County (legend)

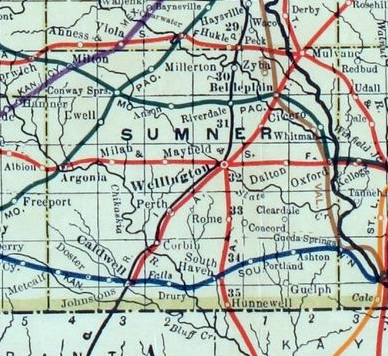
1915 railroad map of Sumner County

Ashton is an unincorporated community in Walton Township, Sumner County, Kansas, United States. It is located about halfway between South Haven and Arkansas City at 1.75 miles north of the intersection of S Rock Rd and U.S. Route 166, which is 5.5 miles east of I-35 (Kansas Turnpike), next to an abandoned railroad.

== History ==
Ashton was a station on the Kansas Southwestern Railway that previously passed through the community, east to west, from Geuda Springs to South Haven.

A post office was opened in Ashton in 1887, and remained in operation until it was discontinued in 1971.

== Education ==
The community is served by South Haven USD 509 public school district.
