= Electric Park Pavilion =

- U.S. National Register of Historic Places
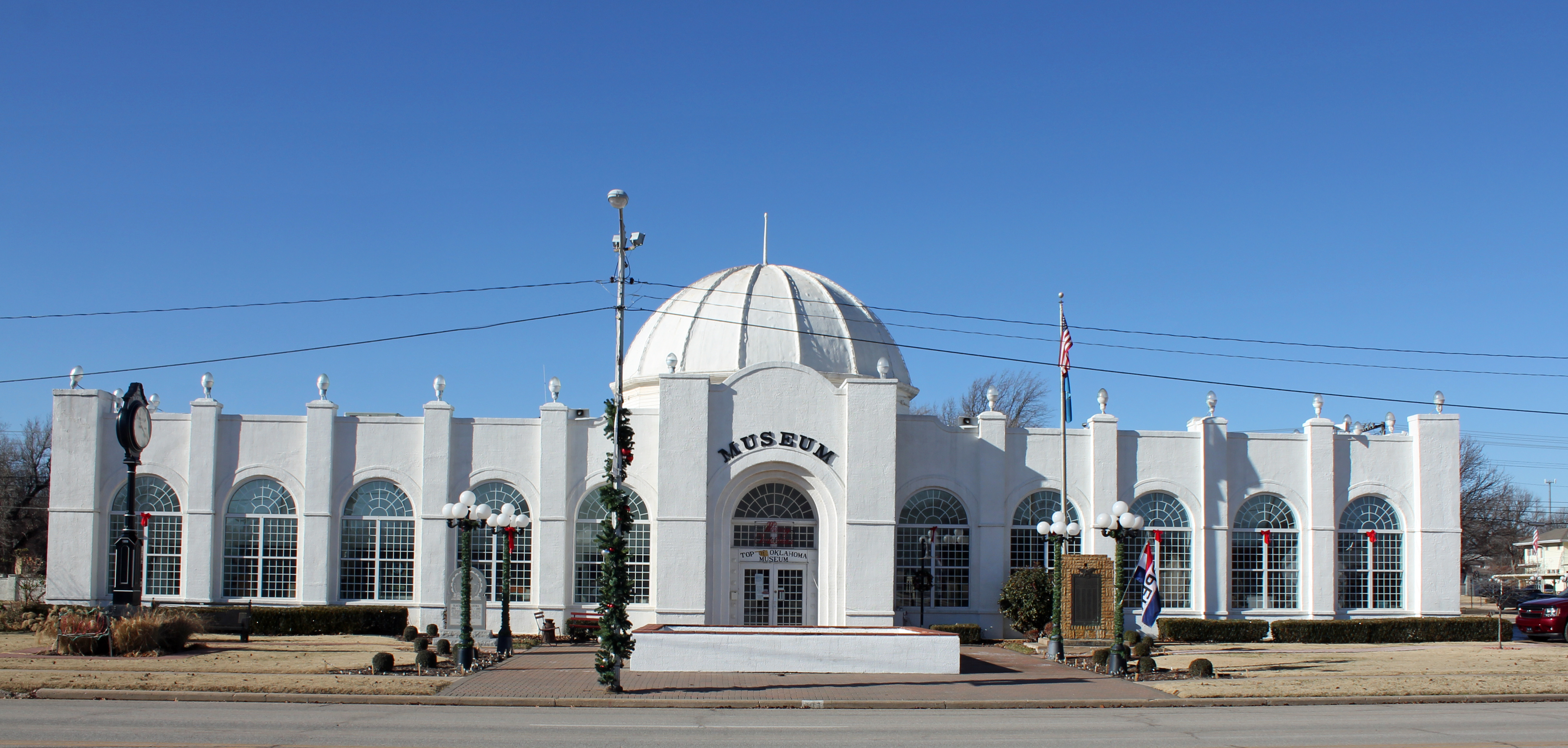
- The Pavilion in 2013.

- Location within Oklahoma Location within the United States
- Location: 300 S. Main, Blackwell, Oklahoma
- Coordinates: 36°48′6″N 97°16′54″W
- Area: 0.3 acres (0.12 ha)
- Built: 1912
- Architectural style: italian renaissance, classical
- NRHP reference No.: 76001563
- Added to NRHP: September 29, 1976

The Electric Park Pavilion is a pavilion located in Blackwell, Oklahoma, designed in 1912 by W.L. McAltee. The pavilion was built as a "salute to electricity" and features a 160-foot domed ceiling, and an 800-seat auditorium. The building was once lined with over 500 lights, on the dome, its 27 flag poles with American flags, and its 22 arched windows. The Mission/Spanish Revival style building is made of brick and stucco, and was dedicated on March 23, 1913.

It currently houses the Top of Oklahoma Historical Society Museum.
