= A. J. Blackwell =

American businessman

A.J. Blackwell
- Born: January 29, 1842
- Died: June 19, 1903 (aged 61)
- Other name: Colonel Blackwell

A.J. Blackwell (Andrew Jackson Blackwell) (January 29, 1842 – June 19, 1903) was the founder and namesake of Blackwell, Kay County, Oklahoma. Blackwell, the city, was founded in September 1893 as of one of the Cherokee Allotments. A.J. Blackwell had settled in the area in 1882, having married the former Rosa Vaught who was of Cherokee descent, he was eligible to found the city. Blackwell served as Justice of the Peace and Mayor of Blackwell. He also worked as a merchant in Fayetteville, Arkansas, built the first house in Ottawa, Kansas, and founded the towns of Rock Falls, Oklahoma Territory, David, Indian Territory, and Chelsea, Indian Territory. An entrepreneur, he also established the first hotel in Blackwell, and was president of the North Oklahoma Railroad.

A.J. Blackwell was born on January 29, 1842, in Georgia to Janos and Matilda Blackwell. He enlisted in the Confederate army during the Civil War under the 3rd Confederate Cavalry. A.J. and Rosa Blackwell had two sons and one daughter: King Solomon, King David and Hazel.

Prior to founding Blackwell, Oklahoma, A.J. Blackwell lived in Joplin, Missouri, where he held bear and dog fights and built the town's first opera house. He was arrested on counterfeiting charges and spent time in the Missouri State Penitentiary. Blackwell also was indicted twice for murder, but was not convicted.

Early settlers in the town of Blackwell reportedly viewed A.J. Blackwell as a despot who operated as "practically a one-man government." At one point, Blackwell brought a group of black workmen into town, in defiance of an unofficial but strict ban on their residence or employment there. This prompted a strong reaction from the townspeople, who fired shots at night at the tent where the black workers were staying. Blackwell responded by brandishing a Winchester rifle to hold off the mob. Ultimately, however, the citizenry drove all members of the black race out of town. A black family attempted to move into Blackwell in 1902, and was chased by a mob of 1,200 people who burned their home.

In 1894, A.J. Blackwell was arrested by the Cherokee government, sentenced to death for treason, and tortured by being poked with steel rods after refusing to confess to charges of selling land to white settlers. He was rescued the night before his scheduled execution. His wife, Rosa, was deeded the land of the town of David, founded in 1895, as she could legally own it. The Cherokees sued, and the white residents of the town were expelled in 1898.

A.J. Blackwell died June 19, 1903, in Chelsea, Indian Territory, another town he had founded. Prior to his death, in July 1902, Blackwell had erected a monument in his honor and publicly read his will.
