= Blackwell Northern Gateway Railroad =

Oklahoma short-line railroad

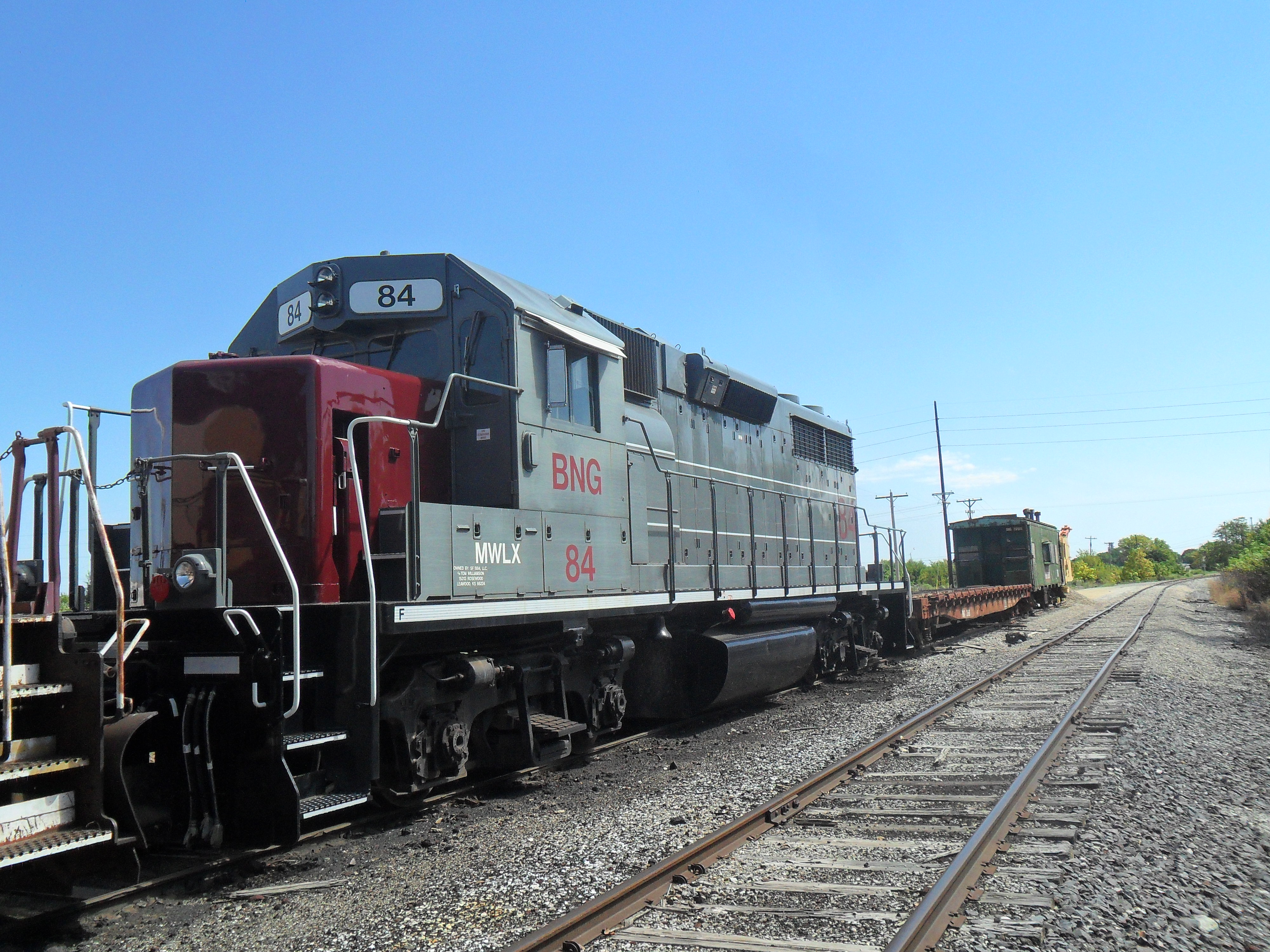
- BNG 84, an EMD GP38-2, sits in the railyard at Blackwell, Oklahoma.

Overview
- Headquarters: Blackwell, Oklahoma
- Reporting mark: BNG
- Dates of operation: January 2, 2006–February 2, 2024

Technical
- Length: 35.26 mi (56.75 km)

Blackwell Northern Gateway Railroad (reporting mark BNG) was a short-line railroad headquartered in Blackwell, Oklahoma. It operated on tracks owned by the Blackwell Industrial Authority (BIA) and the Oklahoma Department of Transportation (ODOT).

The BNG was a replacement for the Blackwell and Northern Railway (BNR), which started service over the same line on November 4, 2002, and which was in turn the replacement for the prior operator, the South Kansas and Oklahoma Railroad. The rails were former Santa Fe trackage, with a portion around Blackwell originating with the St. Louis-San Francisco Railway. The BNG was chartered in Oklahoma on October 31, 2005, contracted to replace the BNR in late 2005, and began operating January 2, 2006. The BNG was an employer for the purposes of the Railroad Retirement Act.

It operated 35.26 miles of line from Blackwell to Hunnewell, Kansas, with trackage rights to Wellington, Kansas. It interchanged with the BNSF Railway at Wellington, and (via the BNSF) with Union Pacific. It also generated revenue storing railcars for larger railroads. It had 8 employees as of 2017.

When the region experienced flooding in May 2019, the line was severely damaged in areas around Blackwell, Braman, Oklahoma, and South Haven, Kansas. The line was temporarily shut down while the affected areas were repaired.

In October 2023, BNG filed to extend its leases on both the BIA and ODOT portions of its line.

== Oklahoma and Kansas Railroad ==
On February 2, 2024, the Federal Railroad Administration (FRA) issued an Emergency Order shutting down the BNG due to public safety concerns regarding operations and maintenance of the line after new ownership and management took over in October 2023. The FRA instigated its investigation into the railroad following two derailments which involved unqualified individuals operating locomotives at the railroad. Prior to the shutdown order there was also an incident involving a hi-rail truck on January 28 that nearly collided with a vehicle at an unprotected grade crossing.

Rock Island Rail requested in late February 2024, and received in early March 2024, an FRA emergency order allowing it to take over operations of the BNG for at least 30 days to be able to handle urgent needs for two shippers on the line. In August 2024, a Rock Island Rail affiliate, the Oklahoma and Kansas Railroad, was granted a long-term lease for the line, as approved by the Surface Transportation Board on September 27, 2024. However, on October 11, ODOT informed the Oklahoma and Kansas Railroad that its lease was being terminated, alleging that the operator had made no effort to rehabilitate the line. ODOT then began seeking a new operator for the trackage.

== Land Rush Rail Corporation ==
On February 18, 2025, Land Rush Rail Corporation ("LRRC"), a subsidiary of Farmrail, filed a verified notice of exemption with the Surface Transportation Board (STB), declaring it had entered into a lease agreement with the BIA and ODOT to take over operations of the former BNG trackage. In 2026, the company committed to rehabilitate the rail line, in a project including over $323,000 in funding from the Kansas Rail Service Improvements Program.
