= South Haven USD 509 =

Public school district in South Haven, Kansas

Address
- 229 S. Kickapoo St. South Haven, Kansas, 67140; United States
- Coordinates: 37°2′55″N 97°23′52″W

District information
- Type: Public
- Grades: K to 12
- Superintendent: Daniel Farley
- Schools: 2

Other information
- Website: www.usd509.org

South Haven USD 509 is a public unified school district headquartered in South Haven, Kansas, United States. The district includes the communities of South Haven, Hunnewell, Ashton, Portland, and nearby rural areas.

== Schools ==
The school district operates the following schools:

- South Haven High School
- South Haven Elementary School

== See also ==
- List of high schools in Kansas
- List of unified school districts in Kansas
- Kansas State Department of Education
- Kansas State High School Activities Association
