= Blackwell Journal-Tribune =

Newspaper in Blackwell, Oklahoma

- Type: Weekly newspaper
- Format: Broadsheet
- Owner(s): American Hometown Publishing, Inc.
- Publisher: Belinda Ramsey
- Headquarters: 523 S. Main Street Blackwell, Oklahoma, 74631 United States
- Circulation: 1,500
- Website: blackwelljournaltribune.net

The Blackwell Journal-Tribune is a weekly newspaper in Blackwell, Oklahoma. It is distributed Wednesdays via mail and has a circulation of roughly 1,500.

The paper primarily serves Blackwell, but also provides news and sports coverage of neighboring communities in Kay and Grant counties in north central Oklahoma and a small portion of Sumner County in south central Kansas. The small towns of Braman, Nardin, Lamont, Deer Creek, Newkirk, Medford, and South Haven (KS) are included in this coverage area.

The publication is the result of a 1939 merger of the Daily Tribune and the Blackwell Journal. The Daily Tribune was published first as the Daily World in 1915. The Blackwell Tribune began publication in 1933, and the two papers merged six years later. For 67 years, the paper was published at the newspaper building, located at 113 East Blackwell Avenue, before being shifted to an off-site printing format in 2007. In 2015 the old building was condemned and the small staff were located to a new facility on Main Street.
