= Hunnewell, Kansas =

City in Sumner County, Kansas

- City
- Location within Sumner County and Kansas

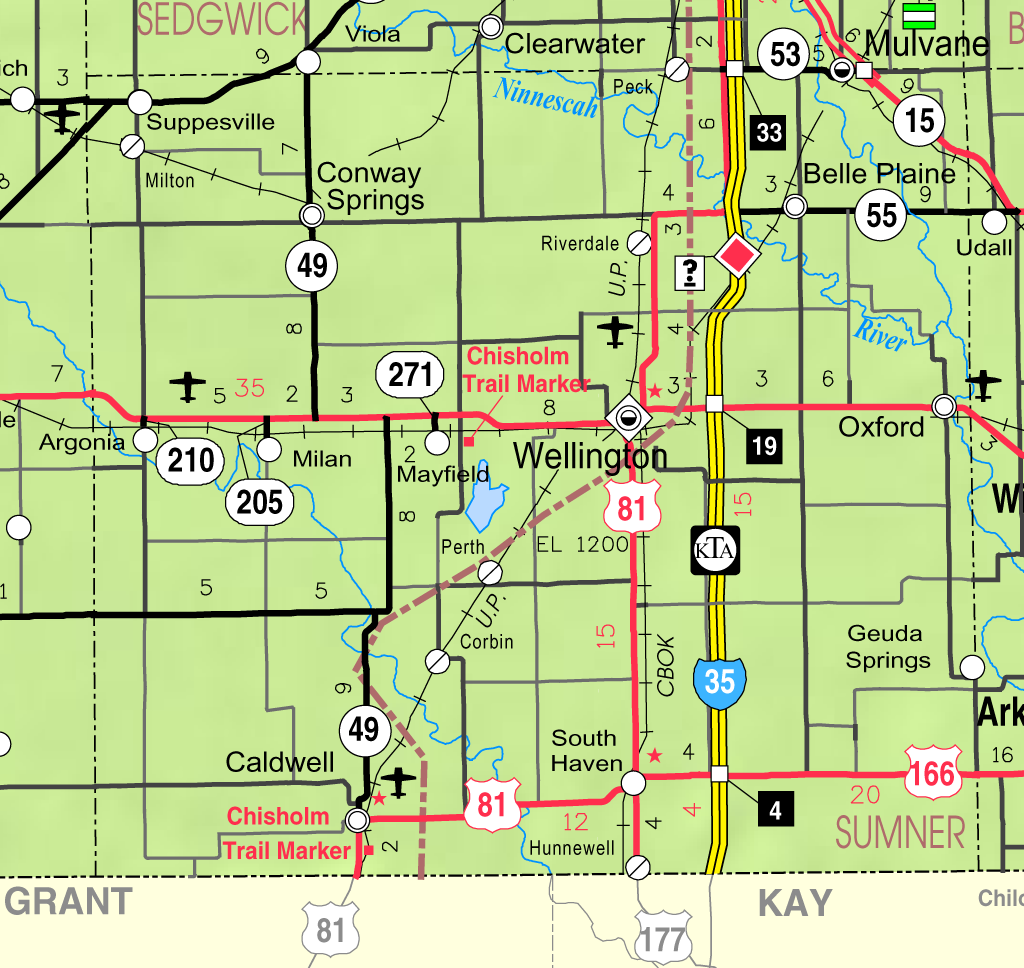
- KDOT map of Sumner County (legend)
- Coordinates: 37°00′14″N 97°24′27″W
- Country: United States
- State: Kansas
- County: Sumner
- Founded: 1880
- Incorporated: 1882
- Named for: H. H. Hunnewell

Area
  - Total: 0.55 sq mi (1.43 km^{2})
  - Land: 0.55 sq mi (1.43 km^{2})
  - Water: 0 sq mi (0.00 km^{2})
- Elevation: 1,102 ft (336 m)

Population (2020)
  - Total: 44
  - Density: 80/sq mi (31/km^{2})
- Time zone: UTC-6 (CST)
  - Summer (DST): UTC-5 (CDT)
- ZIP Code: 67140
- Area code: 620
- FIPS code: 20-33500
- GNIS ID: 2394449

Hunnewell is a city in Sumner County, Kansas, United States. As of the 2020 census, the population of the city was 44.

== History ==
Hunnewell was founded in 1880. It was named for Boston financier and railway owner H. H. Hunnewell.

Hunnewell served as a shipping point for Texas cattle, and was a prosperous cowtown during the 1880s. The Leavenworth, Lawrence, & Galveston Railroad provided quick access to the Kansas City, Kansas stockyards, and the Kansas and Southeastern Railroad was built south from Hunnewell into Oklahoma in 1898. The town in its heyday had one hotel, two general stores, one barber shop, two dance halls, and eight saloons. With little more than railroad workers and cowboys, violence was common. There were no lawmen to speak of during the 1880s in or around that area, and typically cattle rustling and other crimes were dealt with by the ranchers themselves. This culminated in the Hunnewell, Kansas Gunfight, on October 5, 1884.

A post office was opened in Hunnewell in 1880, and remained in operation until it was discontinued in 1960.

The railroads have still not abandoned Hunnewell; it continues to be served by the Land Rush Rail Corporation ("LRRC"), an affiliate of Farmrail, as replacement for the Blackwell Northern Gateway Railroad which between 2006 and 2024 operated the line running from Blackwell, Oklahoma through Hunnewell and on to connections with the BNSF at Wellington, Kansas and (via the BNSF) with the Union Pacific.

== Geography ==
According to the United States Census Bureau, the city has a total area of 0.49 square miles (1.27 km^{2}), all land.

== Demographics ==
Historical population
Census	Pop.	Note	%±
1890	168		—
1900	233		38.7%
1910	208		−10.7%
1920	209		0.5%
1930	205		−1.9%
1940	166		−19.0%
1950	103		−38.0%
1960	83		−19.4%
1970	77		−7.2%
1980	86		11.7%
1990	87		1.2%
2000	83		−4.6%
2010	67		−19.3%
2020	44		−34.3%
U.S. Decennial Census

=== 2020 census ===
The 2020 United States census counted 44 people, 18 households, and 11 families in Hunnewell. The population density was 79.1 per square mile (30.6/km^{2}). There were 27 housing units at an average density of 48.6 per square mile (18.7/km^{2}). The racial makeup was 97.73% (43) white or European American (97.73% non-Hispanic white), 0.0% (0) black or African-American, 0.0% (0) Native American or Alaska Native, 0.0% (0) Asian, 0.0% (0) Pacific Islander or Native Hawaiian, 0.0% (0) from other races, and 2.27% (1) from two or more races. Hispanic or Latino of any race was 0.0% (0) of the population.

Of the 18 households, 27.8% had children under the age of 18; 50.0% were married couples living together; 22.2% had a female householder with no spouse or partner present. 33.3% of households consisted of individuals and 16.7% had someone living alone who was 65 years of age or older. The average household size was 3.4 and the average family size was 3.8.

18.2% of the population was under the age of 18, 4.5% from 18 to 24, 18.2% from 25 to 44, 31.8% from 45 to 64, and 27.3% who were 65 years of age or older. The median age was 50.0 years. For every 100 females, there were 175.0 males. For every 100 females ages 18 and older, there were 140.0 males.

The 2016–2020 5-year American Community Survey estimates show that the median household income was $101,875 (with a margin of error of +/- $95,226) and the median family income was $121,875 (+/- $41,677).

=== 2010 census ===
As of the census of 2010, there were 67 people, 26 households, and 20 families residing in the city. The population density was 136.7 inhabitants per square mile (52.8/km^{2}). There were 41 housing units at an average density of 83.7 per square mile (32.3/km^{2}). The racial makeup of the city was 92.5% White, 6.0% Native American, and 1.5% from two or more races.

There were 26 households, of which 34.6% had children under the age of 18 living with them, 65.4% were married couples living together, 11.5% had a female householder with no husband present, and 23.1% were non-families. 19.2% of all households were made up of individuals, and 3.8% had someone living alone who was 65 years of age or older. The average household size was 2.58 and the average family size was 2.90.

The median age in the city was 42.3 years. 28.4% of residents were under the age of 18; 3.1% were between the ages of 18 and 24; 23.9% were from 25 to 44; 35.9% were from 45 to 64; and 9% were 65 years of age or older. The gender makeup of the city was 52.2% male and 47.8% female.

=== 2000 census ===
As of the census of 2000, there were 83 people, 24 households, and 21 families residing in the city. The population density was 173.4 inhabitants per square mile (67.0/km^{2}). There were 34 housing units at an average density of 71.0 per square mile (27.4/km^{2}). The racial makeup of the city was 97.59% White and 2.41% Native American.

There were 24 households, out of which 58.3% had children under the age of 18 living with them, 79.2% were married couples living together, 8.3% had a female householder with no husband present, and 12.5% were non-families. 8.3% of all households were made up of individuals, and 4.2% had someone living alone who was 65 years of age or older. The average household size was 3.46 and the average family size was 3.76.

In the city, the population was spread out, with 42.2% under the age of 18, 4.8% from 18 to 24, 27.7% from 25 to 44, 19.3% from 45 to 64, and 6.0% who were 65 years of age or older. The median age was 28 years. For every 100 females, there were 97.6 males. For every 100 females age 18 and over, there were 100.0 males.

The median income for a household in the city was $16,875, and the median income for a family was $49,375. Males had a median income of $67,917 versus $23,750 for females. The per capita income for the city was $12,729. There were 13.3% of families and 20.7% of the population living below the poverty line, including no under eighteens and none of those over 64.

== Education ==
The community is served by South Haven USD 509 public school district.

== Gallery ==
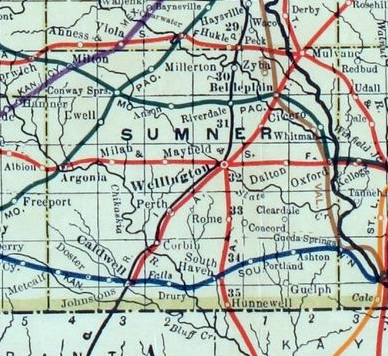
1915 railroad map of Sumner County

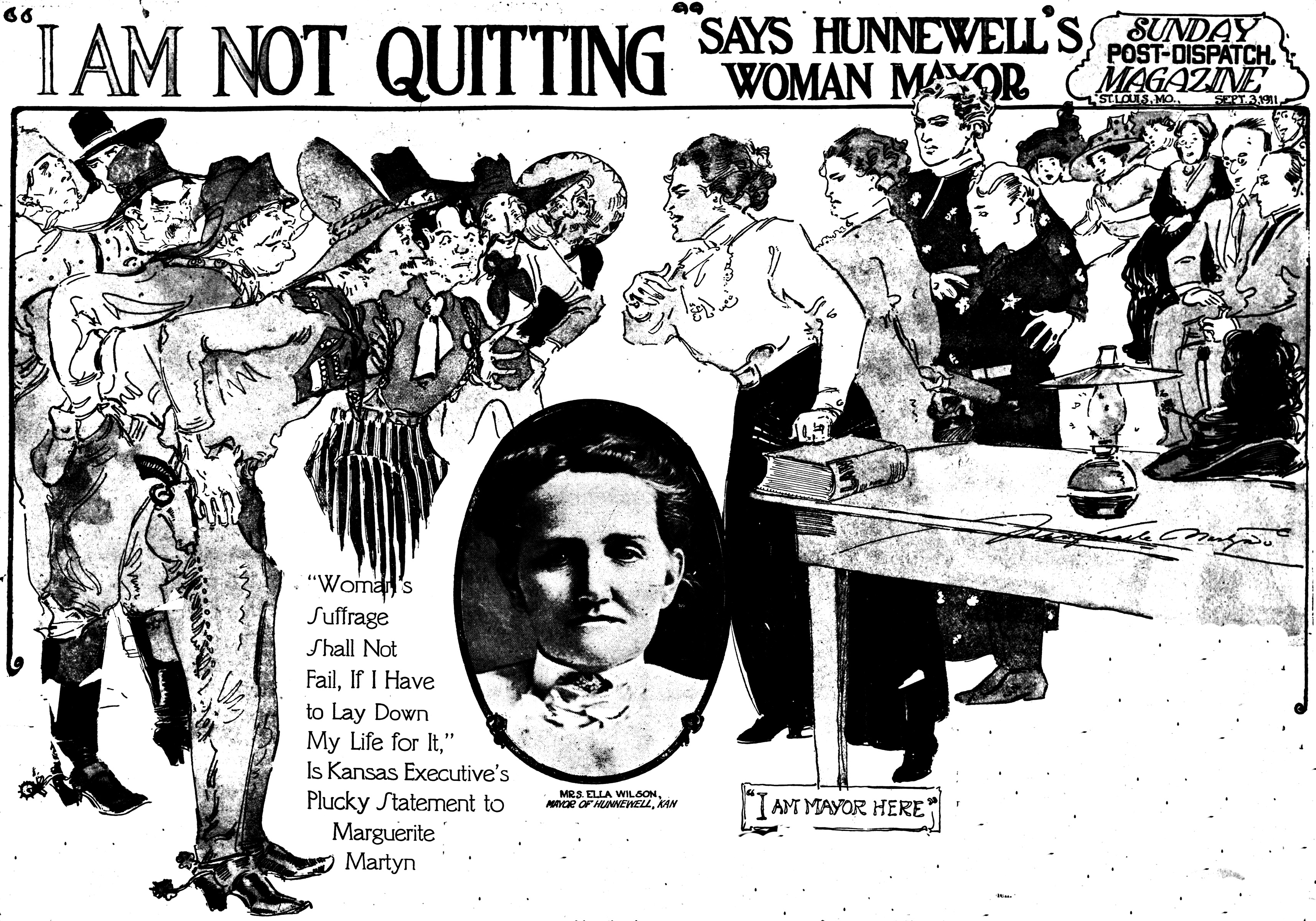
Imaginative drawing by reporter Marguerite Martyn of Mayor Ella Wilson of Hunnewell, her supporters and opponents, with a photo. The all-male city council was attempting to remove her. St. Louis Post-Dispatch, September 3, 1911
