= Blackwell–Tonkawa Municipal Airport =

Airport in Kay County, Oklahoma, United States

- IATA: BWL; ICAO: KBKN; FAA LID: BKN

Summary
- Airport type: Public
- Owner: Cities of Blackwell & Tonkawa
- Serves: Blackwell / Tonkawa, Oklahoma
- Location: Kay County, Oklahoma
- Elevation AMSL: 1,030 ft (310 m)
- Coordinates: 36°44′42″N 097°20′58″W
- Interactive map of Blackwell–Tonkawa Municipal Airport

Runways
Direction	Length		Surface
Direction	ft	m	Surface
17/35	3,501	1,067	Asphalt

Statistics (2008)
- Aircraft operations: 2,400
- Based aircraft: 15
- Source: Federal Aviation Administration

Blackwell–Tonkawa Municipal Airport (IATA: BWL, ICAO: KBKN, FAA LID: BKN, formerly 4O3) is a public use airport located in Kay County, Oklahoma, United States. The airport is 5 nautical miles (9.3 km) southwest of the central business district of Blackwell, Oklahoma and is owned by the cities of Blackwell and Tonkawa.

Although most U.S. airports use the same three-letter location identifier for the FAA and IATA, Blackwell–Tonkawa Municipal Airport is assigned BKN by the FAA and BWL by the IATA (which assigned BKN to Balkanabat Airport in Balkanabat, Turkmenistan).

== Facilities and aircraft ==
Blackwell–Tonkawa Municipal Airport covers an area of 209 acres (85 ha) at an elevation of 1,030 feet (314 m) above mean sea level. It has one runway designated 17/35 with an asphalt surface measuring 3,501 by 60 feet (1,067 x 18 m).

For the 12-month period ending May 6, 2008, the airport had 2,400 general aviation aircraft operations, an average of 200 per month. At that time there were 15 aircraft based at this airport: 100% single-engine.

== See also ==
- List of airports in Oklahoma
