= Blackwell, Oklahoma =

- City
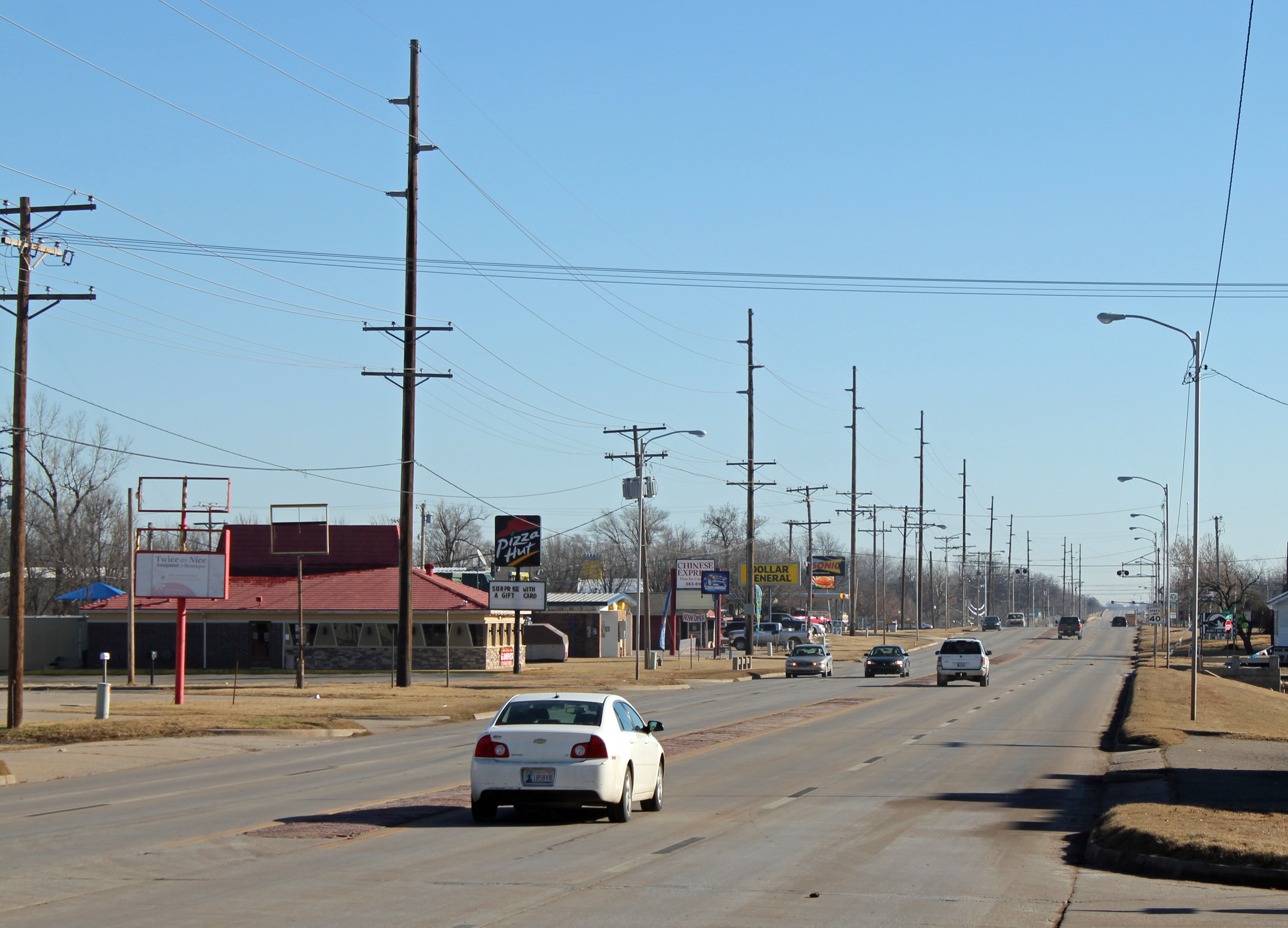
- Looking east along West Doolin Ave (2013)

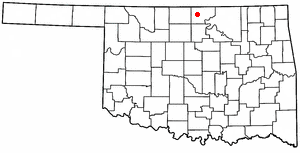
- Location of Blackwell in Oklahoma.
- Coordinates: 36°48′05″N 97°18′03″W
- Country: United States
- State: Oklahoma
- County: Kay
- Established: September 16, 1893

Government
  - Type: Council-Manager
  - City Manager: Jerry Wieland
  - Mayor: Pat Hullet

Area
  - Total: 5.58 sq mi (14.46 km^{2})
  - Land: 5.58 sq mi (14.46 km^{2})
  - Water: 0 sq mi (0.00 km^{2})
- Elevation: 1,024 ft (312 m)

Population (2020)
  - Total: 6,085
  - Density: 1,090.1/sq mi (420.89/km^{2})
- Time zone: UTC-6 (Central (CST))
  - Summer (DST): UTC-5 (CDT)
- ZIP code: 74631
- Area code: 580
- FIPS code: 40-06600
- GNIS feature ID: 2409858
- Website: City Website

Blackwell is a city in Kay County, Oklahoma, United States, located at the intersection of U.S. Highway 177 and State Highway 11 along Interstate 35. The population was 6,085 as of the 2020 census. Blackwell was established following the September 16, 1893 Cherokee Outlet land run by A. J. Blackwell. Blackwell has an agricultural and fossil fuel based economy.

== History ==
=== Founding ===
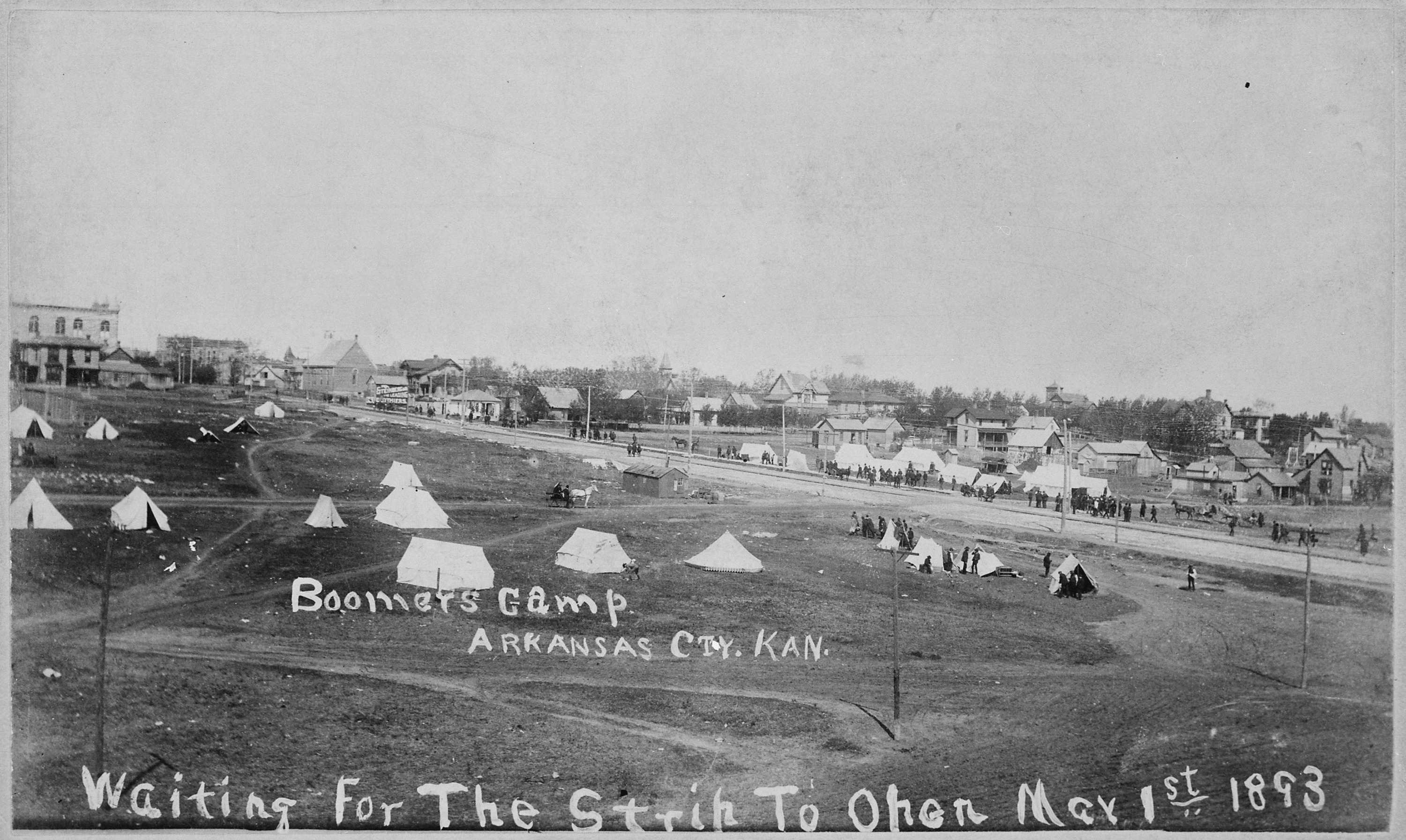
Boomer camp at Arkansas City, Kansas waiting for Land Run of 1893.

Blackwell came into existence during the Cherokee Outlet Opening on September 16, 1893, in the run known as the Cherokee Strip Land Run. The town is named for A. J. Blackwell, who was the dominant force in its founding. Andrew Blackwell had settled in the area in 1882, having married the former Rosa Vaught who was of Cherokee descent, he was eligible to found the city. Blackwell served as Justice of the Peace and Mayor of Blackwell.

Blackwell's first school opened in September 1893 in a small, frame building with fifty-two students in attendance. A gradual enrollment increase created a need for ten teachers by 1899.

A post office was established on December 1, 1893. Due to a struggle for regional prominence between Blackwell and nearby Parker, the post office was named Parker from April 2, 1894, to February 4, 1895. After that, the name reverted to Blackwell.

Prior to the Civil Rights Movement Blackwell had a reputation as a sundown town, having kept out African Americans through violent expulsion and the display of a sign warning them to leave town by sunset. Blackwell's expulsion of its African-American residents around 1893 is described in the 1967 book From Slavery to Freedom by John Hope Franklin. According to local newspaper records from the time, the town had a sign that read, "Negro, don't let the sun set on you here."

=== Zinc smelter ===
Blackwell Zinc Smelter (Photograph used for a story in the Daily Oklahoman newspaper, September 23, 1958. Caption: 'The Blackwell Zinc Co. smelter employs upward of 1,000 persons in Blackwell and contributes an annual industrial payroll to the city estimated at $4 millions.').

The Blackwell Zinc Company smelter first began operations in 1917. In 1974, the 80-acre Blackwell Zinc Smelter facility ceased operations. At the time, it was the city's largest employer, employing 800 people in 1972, and over 1,000 at its peak. It also was one of the largest zinc smelter facilities in the United States. After its closure the land was donated to the Blackwell Industrial Authority (BIA). Soil from the land was repurposed throughout the city, leading to widespread contamination of air and water, including the Chikaskia River. One of the plant's two Corliss stationary steam engines was moved to Pawnee Oklahoma and preserved; this engine is run for viewing by the public on the first weekend of May.

The Oklahoma Department of Environmental Quality has been overseeing remediation of contamination at the industrial park, groundwater, and soil throughout parts of the city since 1992. Phelps Dodge Corporation, a subsidiary of Freeport-McMoRan Copper & Gold Inc, has owned the site since 1999. On October 15, 2009, the City of Blackwell filed suit against Freeport-McMoRan calling the contamination a nuisance, and alleging that 58 million pounds of toxic waste remained in the city, causing illness within its 7,200 residents. Following several changes of venue between Federal court and Kay County courts, the City of Blackwell and Freeport settled for 54-million dollars on February 4, 2010.

=== 1955 F5 tornado ===
Blackwell was a victim of the 1955 Great Plains tornado outbreak, a deadly tornado outbreak that struck the southern and central U.S Great Plains States on May 25–26, 1955. It produced at least 46 tornadoes across seven states including two F5 tornadoes in Blackwell, Oklahoma, and Udall, Kansas. The outbreak killed 102 from three tornadoes while injuring hundreds more. Unusual electromagnetic activity was observed, including St. Elmo's fire.

The Blackwell tornado formed in Noble County at around 9:00 pm CDT before crossing through the eastern portions of the Kay County town of Blackwell as an F5 wedge tornado. Then about 400 yd (0.23 mi) wide (Grazulis 1991), It claimed the lives of 20 people in Blackwell and injured over 200 before crossing into and dissipating over Cowley County, Kansas. Along with destroying nearly 200 homes, the tornado demolished two of the town's main employers, the Acme Foundry and the Hazel Atlas Glass plant. Four hundred homes were destroyed or swept away, and 500 other homes were damaged. Sixty businesses were also destroyed and the local hospital sustained major damage. Most of the western half of the town was spared the worst of the damage.

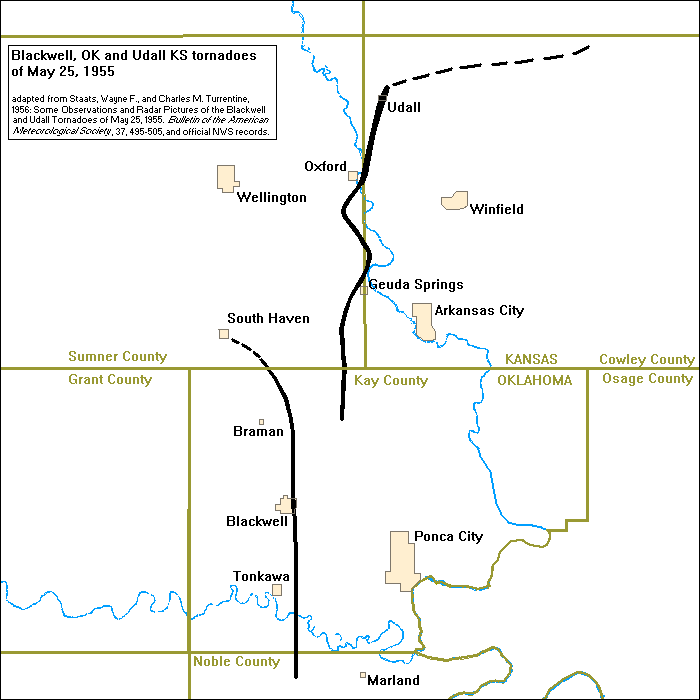
1955 tornado tracks map

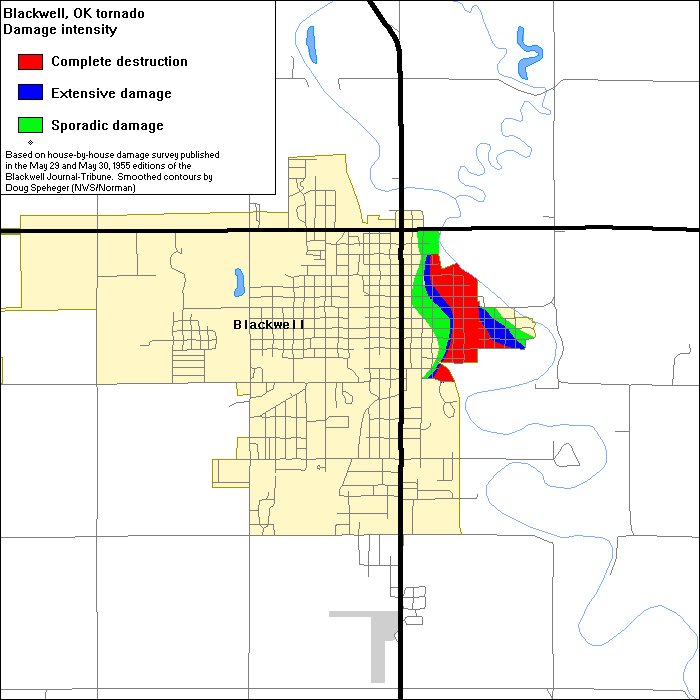
1955 tornado destruction map of Blackwell

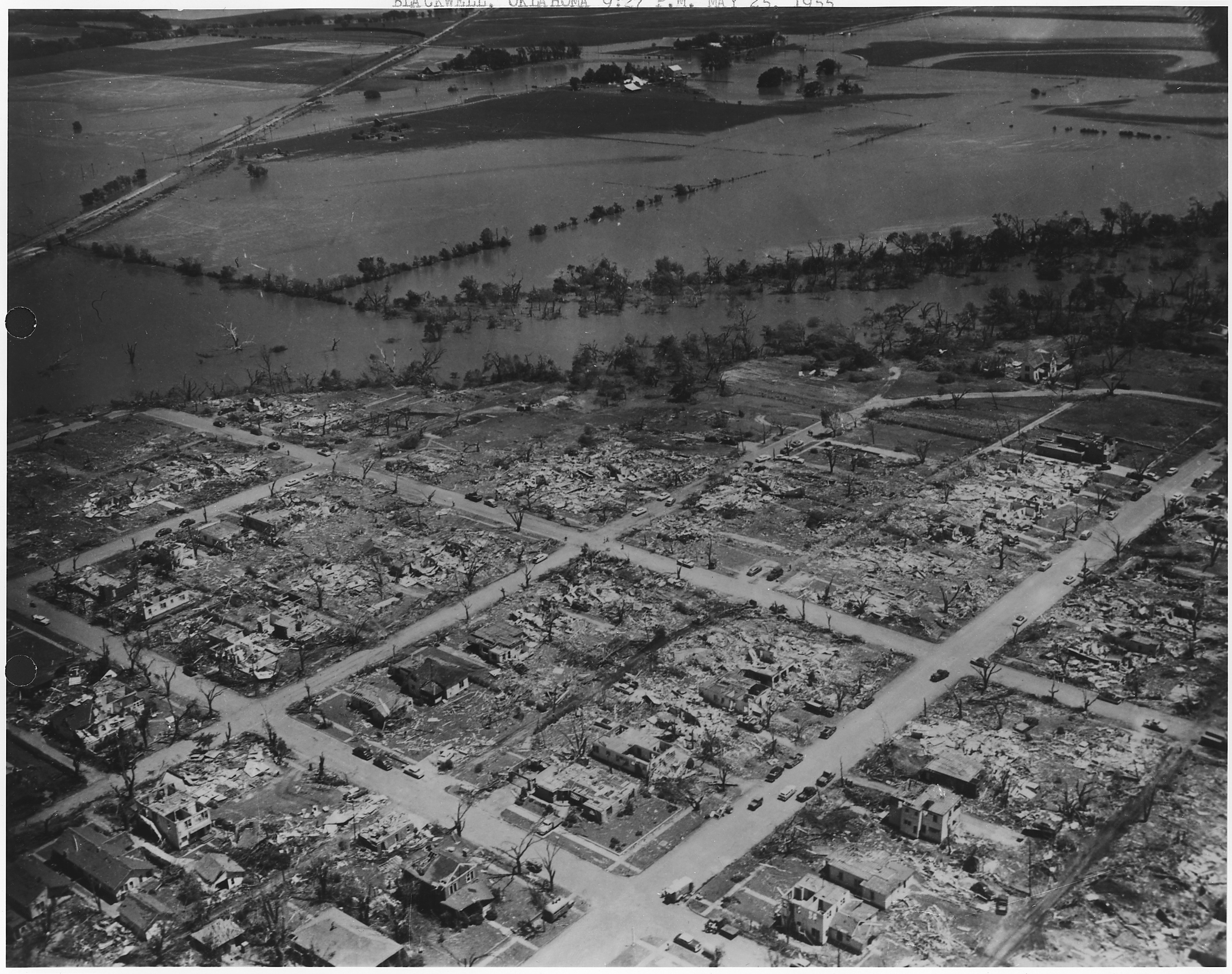
1955 tornado damage of Blackwell

== Geography ==
Blackwell is located along the Chikaskia River and to the east of Interstate 35. According to the United States Census Bureau, the city has a total area of 5.5 square miles (14 km^{2}), of which, 5.4 square miles (14 km^{2}) is land and 0.18% is water.

=== Climate ===
In May 1906, an L5 meteorite fell, landing in Blackwell, Oklahoma. On May 25, 1955, a deadly F5 tornado, part of the 1955 Great Plains tornado outbreak, struck Blackwell at approximately 9:30 pm and cut a swath of destruction through the northeastern portion of the city, roughly centered in the neighborhoods surrounding Riverside Park. 20 residents died and over 250 were injured. The tornado outbreak included another F5 tornado that struck Udall, Kansas killing 80 people and injuring over 270. The outbreak spawned 19 tornadoes across Oklahoma, Texas and Kansas alone.

Climate data for Blackwell, Oklahoma (1991–2020 normals, extremes 1954–2019)
| Month | Jan | Feb | Mar | Apr | May | Jun | Jul | Aug | Sep | Oct | Nov | Dec | Year |
|---|---|---|---|---|---|---|---|---|---|---|---|---|---|
| Record high °F (°C) | 79 (26) | 92 (33) | 91 (33) | 98 (37) | 104 (40) | 109 (43) | 114 (46) | 114 (46) | 108 (42) | 98 (37) | 90 (32) | 80 (27) | 114 (46) |
| Mean daily maximum °F (°C) | 46.9 (8.3) | 51.8 (11.0) | 61.3 (16.3) | 70.7 (21.5) | 79.2 (26.2) | 88.6 (31.4) | 93.8 (34.3) | 92.7 (33.7) | 84.8 (29.3) | 73.2 (22.9) | 60.0 (15.6) | 48.7 (9.3) | 71.0 (21.7) |
| Daily mean °F (°C) | 34.6 (1.4) | 38.7 (3.7) | 47.8 (8.8) | 57.2 (14.0) | 67.1 (19.5) | 76.8 (24.9) | 81.5 (27.5) | 80.2 (26.8) | 72.2 (22.3) | 59.9 (15.5) | 47.2 (8.4) | 37.1 (2.8) | 58.4 (14.7) |
| Mean daily minimum °F (°C) | 22.2 (−5.4) | 25.6 (−3.6) | 34.3 (1.3) | 43.6 (6.4) | 54.9 (12.7) | 64.9 (18.3) | 69.3 (20.7) | 67.7 (19.8) | 59.6 (15.3) | 46.6 (8.1) | 34.4 (1.3) | 25.5 (−3.6) | 45.7 (7.6) |
| Record low °F (°C) | −10 (−23) | −20 (−29) | 0 (−18) | 19 (−7) | 33 (1) | 46 (8) | 49 (9) | 46 (8) | 29 (−2) | 15 (−9) | 6 (−14) | −12 (−24) | −20 (−29) |
| Average precipitation inches (mm) | 1.25 (32) | 1.41 (36) | 2.83 (72) | 3.92 (100) | 5.39 (137) | 5.14 (131) | 4.38 (111) | 4.12 (105) | 3.17 (81) | 3.61 (92) | 1.92 (49) | 1.68 (43) | 38.82 (986) |
| Average snowfall inches (cm) | 2.0 (5.1) | 1.7 (4.3) | 1.4 (3.6) | 0.1 (0.25) | 0.0 (0.0) | 0.0 (0.0) | 0.0 (0.0) | 0.0 (0.0) | 0.0 (0.0) | 0.0 (0.0) | 0.1 (0.25) | 2.6 (6.6) | 7.9 (20) |
| Average precipitation days (≥ 0.01 in) | 4.5 | 5.2 | 6.9 | 7.8 | 9.3 | 9.1 | 7.7 | 7.8 | 6.4 | 6.5 | 5.2 | 5.2 | 81.6 |
| Average snowy days (≥ 0.1 in) | 1.2 | 0.9 | 0.5 | 0.0 | 0.0 | 0.0 | 0.0 | 0.0 | 0.0 | 0.0 | 0.1 | 1.1 | 3.8 |
Source: NOAA

== Demographics ==
Historical population
| Census | Pop. | Note | %± |
|---|---|---|---|
| 1900 | 2,283 | | — |
| 1910 | 3,266 | | 43.1% |
| 1920 | 7,174 | | 119.7% |
| 1930 | 9,521 | | 32.7% |
| 1940 | 8,537 | | −10.3% |
| 1950 | 9,199 | | 7.8% |
| 1960 | 9,588 | | 4.2% |
| 1970 | 8,645 | | −9.8% |
| 1980 | 8,400 | | −2.8% |
| 1990 | 7,538 | | −10.3% |
| 2000 | 7,668 | | 1.7% |
| 2010 | 7,092 | | −7.5% |
| 2020 | 6,085 | | −14.2% |
Data from United States Census Bureau

=== 2020 census ===
As of the 2020 census, Blackwell had a population of 6,085 people and 2,532 households, and the population density was 1,091.5 inhabitants per square mile (421.43/km^{2}).

The median age was 40.2 years. 24.4% of residents were under the age of 18 and 19.6% of residents were 65 years of age or older. For every 100 females there were 97.4 males, and for every 100 females age 18 and over there were 93.4 males age 18 and over.

Of the 2,532 households, 30.8% had children under the age of 18 living in them, 41.0% were married-couple households, 20.5% were households with a male householder and no spouse or partner present, and 29.8% were households with a female householder and no spouse or partner present. About 33.2% of all households were made up of individuals and 16.8% had someone living alone who was 65 years of age or older.

There were 3,218 housing units, of which 21.3% were vacant. Among occupied housing units, 67.1% were owner-occupied and 32.9% were renter-occupied; the homeowner vacancy rate was 4.1% and the rental vacancy rate was 23.8%.

98.0% of residents lived in urban areas, while 2.0% lived in rural areas.

Racial composition as of the 2020 census
| Race | Percent |
|---|---|
| White | 79.1% |
| Black or African American | 0.6% |
| American Indian and Alaska Native | 6.2% |
| Asian | 0.6% |
| Native Hawaiian and Other Pacific Islander | 0.1% |
| Some other race | 3.5% |
| Two or more races | 9.9% |
| Hispanic or Latino (of any race) | 9.0% |

=== 2020 American Community Survey ===
Per the 2020 American Community Survey 5-year estimates comparison profiles, the median income for a household in the city of Blackwell was $42,407, the median income for a family was $46,169, and the per capita income was $20,476. About 16.1% of families and 20.2% of the population were below the poverty line, including 29.5% of those under age 18 and 15.8% of those age 65 or over.

== Arts and culture ==
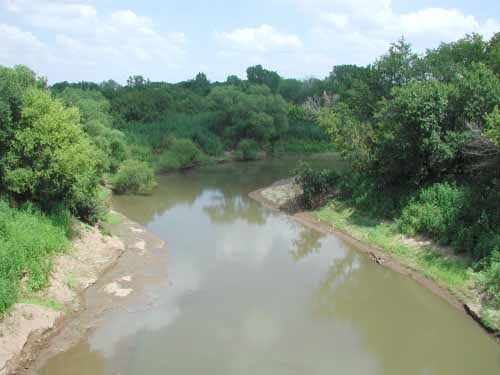
The Chikaskia River at Blackwell.

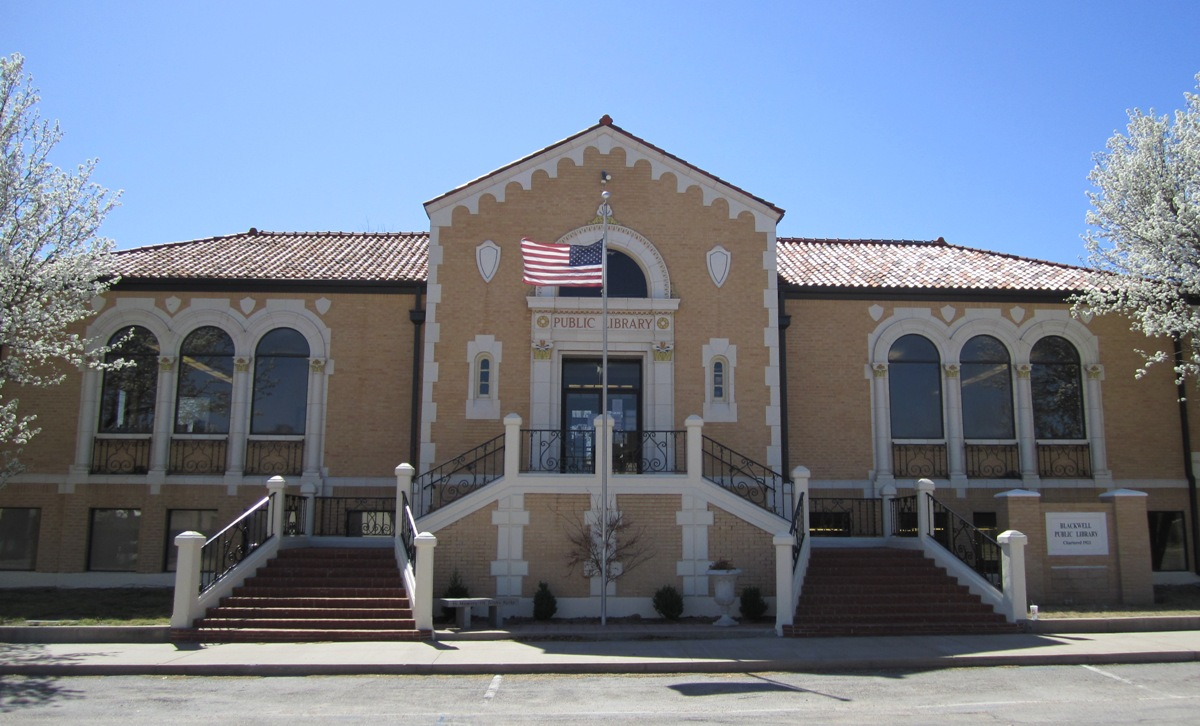
The Blackwell Public Library was constructed in 1921.

=== Parks, museums, and cultural events ===
The Top of Oklahoma Historical Society Museum is located in the Electric Park Pavilion and displays artifacts from the land run, antiques, and local history. Blackwell hosts the Kay County Free Fair in September. Blackwell is served by 5 major parks including Riverside, Bagby, Rogers, Memorial, and Legion parks. Blackwell has a public pool, Blackwell Memorial Pool, which has one of the state's 12 Statue of Liberty replicas installed by the Boy Scouts of America in 1951.

The Blackwell Public Library offers a variety of community resources as well as events, classes, and workshops.

The 9-hole "Blackwell" course at the Blackwell Municipal Golf Course facility opened in 1926. It features 3,143 yards of golf from the longest tees for a par of 36. The course rating is 70.2 and it has a slope rating of 120 on Bermuda grass.

Blackwell currently hosts the State of Oklahoma's first Barn Quilt Geo-Trail which consists of 60 uniquely designed barn quilts representing all 50 states of the U.S. as well as several uniquely created designs.

Historically, Blackwell also held the Tulips-A-Bloom Festival which celebrated springtime in Oklahoma.

Blackwell is home to eight locations on the National Register of Historic Places including the brick WPA Armory, the Rivoli Theatre, and the Larkin Hotel where aviator Amelia Earheart stayed just six months prior to her disappearance.

== Sports ==
In 2023, The Pecos League announced that a new baseball team will be put in Blackwell, The Blackwell Fly Catchers.

== Government ==
The City of Blackwell is a Dillon's rule Charter City, which is governed by a Council-Manager form of government. As such, executive duties are carried out by the City Manager on behalf of the City Council.

The Blackwell City Council currently consists of Richard Braden, representing Ward 1; Karey Henderson, representing Ward 2; Scott Moen, representing Ward 3; and Todd Murphy, representing Ward 4; and Pat Hullet holding the current position of Mayor.

The current City Manager is Jerry Wieland. The Chief of Police is Jay Brewer and the Fire Chief is Cordell Hanebrink.

=== Blackwell City Council ===
The Blackwell City Council currently consists of five electors holding three-year terms (or until their successors are elected and qualified.) Four of the council members represent their individual ward in which they reside for the entire term of their office, and which represents roughly one quarter of the city's population. The fifth member of the council, the mayor, is elected without regard to residency in any particular ward. The mayor serves as the chairperson of the city council. Each member of the city council is required to have residence in Blackwell for one calendar year prior to their election and must remain a resident through their term or vacate their position; and must be at least 25 at the time of the election. Each year, the City Council elects a vice-mayor among themselves who will fill the duties and obligations of the mayor in the mayor's absence or disqualification.

Vacancies occur when a councilor becomes ineligible to hold their position, resigns, or passes away. If a council position becomes vacant, the remaining council members will appoint a qualified elector for the remainder of the position's term. Ward councilor positions are considered vacant when the representing councilor moves outside of the electing ward's boundaries, with an exception that a change in boundaries does not disqualify a councilor from completing their term for which they were elected.

== Education ==
The Blackwell School District consists of Blackwell Elementary, Blackwell Middle School, and Blackwell High School. As recently as 2017 Huston, Northside, Parkside, and Washington Elementary Schools were used for Pre-K through 5th grade classes. The former school sites are all listed on the National Register of Historic Places. Blackwell's school mascot is the Maroon Spirit, which was memorialized in the Maroon Park on Main Street with a mural painted by the Blackwell High School art class depicting the Maroon Spirit with the names of the seniors given the title of "Maroon Spirit" and "Miss BHS" dating back to the early 1900s. Historically, Oklahoma Baptist College served the city's higher education needs between 1901 and 1913.

== Media ==
Blackwell's local paper is the Blackwell Journal-Tribune. A local radio station KOKB 1580 AM, used to broadcast local sports as well as Northern Oklahoma College's KAYE and the Ponca City-based KLOR.

Blackwell is also known for being the fictional birthplace of Leland Coyle, a major antagonist in The Outlast Trials.

== Infrastructure ==
Blackwell has a full-service city government, that includes, electricity, water, sewage, recreation, police and fire services. The police department has 17 full-time officers, a jail and operates 24 hours per day. The Blackwell Fire Department is a full-time fire department, staffed with 20 paid firefighters/EMT/Paramedics, and also provides ambulance service to Blackwell and the surrounding communities.

=== Transportation ===
Blackwell is served by Interstate 35, US Route 177, and Oklahoma State Highway 11.

Blackwell is home to the Blackwell-Tonkawa Municipal Airport (ICAO: KBKN, FAA LID: BKN, formerly 4O3) with neighboring Tonkawa, Oklahoma.

Historically, Blackwell had multiple rail lines, including the Blackwell and Southern Railway built south from Braman through town to Tonkawa, and the Hutchinson and Southern Railway built east from Medford through town to Ponca City, both lines being acquired by the Atchison, Topeka and Santa Fe Railway by 1900. The town also was linked by the Blackwell, Enid and Southwestern Railway, later acquired by what became the St. Louis-San Francisco Railway, which was built southwest from town to Enid and beyond. Rail abandonments have since occurred, but Blackwell continues to have freight rail service through Land Rush Rail Corporation ("LRRC"), an affiliate of Farmrail, as replacement for the Blackwell Northern Gateway Railroad which operated the line between 2006 and 2024.

=== Healthcare ===
Blackwell and the surrounding communities are served by Stillwater Medical Center's Blackwell branch, a 53-bed facility with 24-hour emergency services and Heli-Pad.

== Notable people ==
- Joe Allbaugh, Former FEMA Director, former Interim City Manager
- Jack Brisco, professional wrestler; former National Wrestling Alliance World Heavyweight Champion.
- Jerry Brisco, professional wrestler and longtime employee of World Wrestling Entertainment.
- Stephen Aloysius Leven, prelate of the Roman Catholic Church.
- William J. McDaniel, retired United States Navy Rear Admiral
- Jamie McGuire, best-selling romance novelist.
- Brad Penny, Major League Baseball pitcher.
- Jim Reese, former member of the Oklahoma House of Representatives and commissioner of the Oklahoma Department of Agriculture
- Paul G. Risser, chancellor of the Oklahoma State System of Higher Education
- Natalie Shirley, former Secretary of Commerce and Tourism and current President of OSU-OKC

== See also ==
- 1955 Great Plains tornado outbreak
- List of sundown towns in the United States
