= Farmrail Corporation =

Farmrail Corporation Farmrail System, Inc.
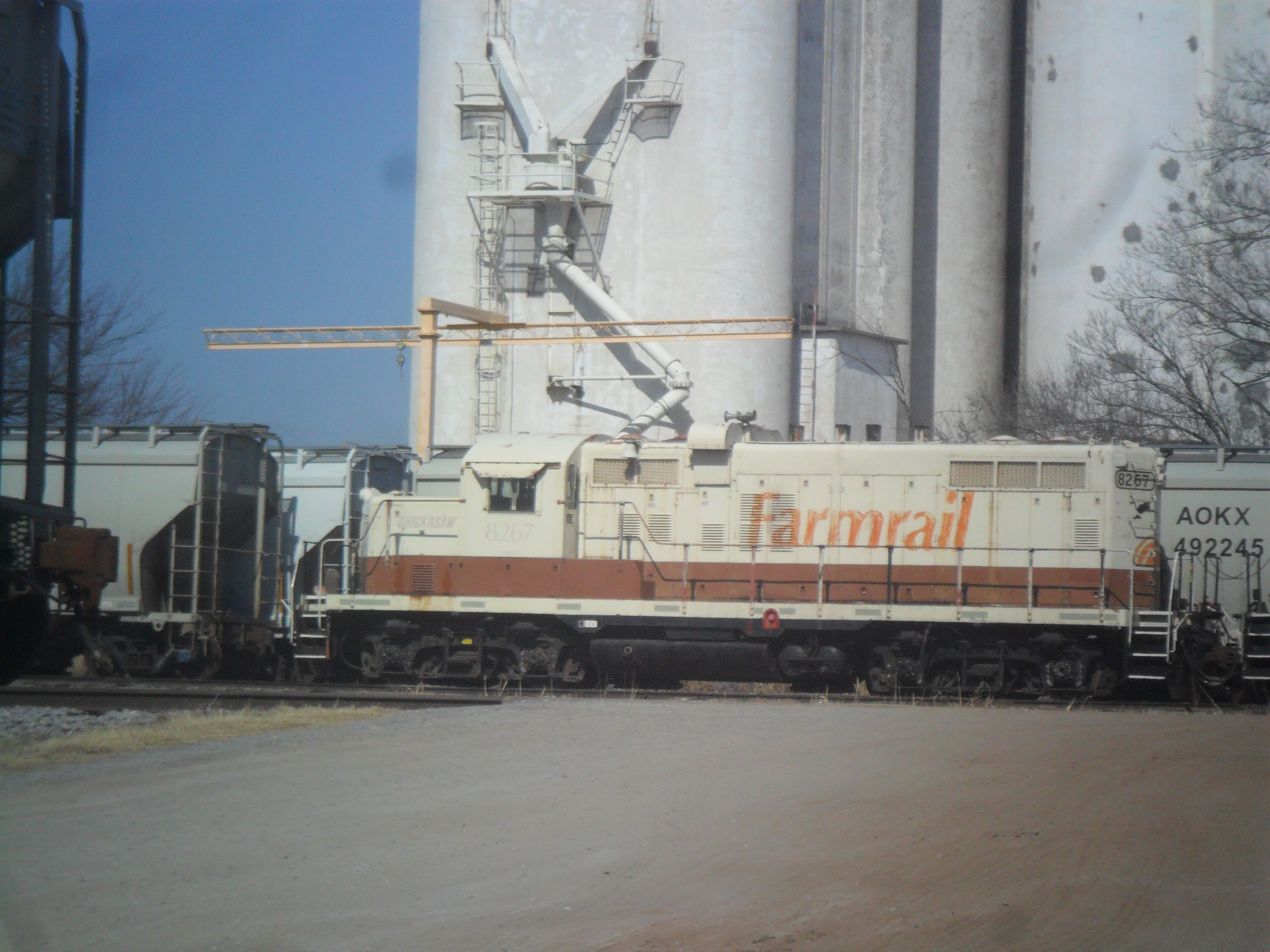
- Farmrail 8267, an EMD GP10, sits idle in Weatherford, Oklahoma, February 18, 2017.

Overview
- Headquarters: Clinton, Oklahoma
- Reporting mark: FMRC
- Locale: Oklahoma
- Dates of operation: 1981–present

Technical
- Track gauge: 4 ft 8 1/2 in (1,435 mm) standard gauge

Other
- Website: www.farmrail.com

Farmrail System, Inc. is an employee-owned holding company for two Class III common-carrier railroads comprising "Western Oklahoma’s Regional Railroad" based in Clinton, Oklahoma. Farmrail Corporation (reporting mark FMRC) has acted since 1981 as a lessee-operator for Oklahoma Department of Transportation, managing an 82-mile east-west former Rock Island line between Weatherford and Erick and an additional 89 miles of former Santa Fe track, Westhorn-Elmer, acquired by the State in 1992 from the ATSF Railway. Another wholly owned affiliate, Grainbelt Corporation (GNBC), was formed in 1987 to buy 176 contiguous north-south route-miles linking Enid and Frederick.

On February 18, 2025, a Farmrail affiliate-- the Land Rush Rail Corporation ("LRRC")-- filed a verified notice of exemption with the Surface Transportation Board (STB), declaring it had entered into a lease agreement with the Blackwell Industrial Authority and the Oklahoma Department of Transportation to take over operations of the former Blackwell Northern Gateway Railroad between Blackwell, Oklahoma and Hunnewell, Kansas, with trackage rights on to Wellington, Kansas, about 37.26 miles.

== Operations ==
Farmrail Corporation (reporting mark FMRC), operates two connected lines:

- An 82-mile (132 km) line from Erick, Oklahoma, through Clinton, to Weatherford, Oklahoma.
- A 104-mile (167 km) line from Westhorn, Oklahoma, through Clinton, to Elmer, Oklahoma.

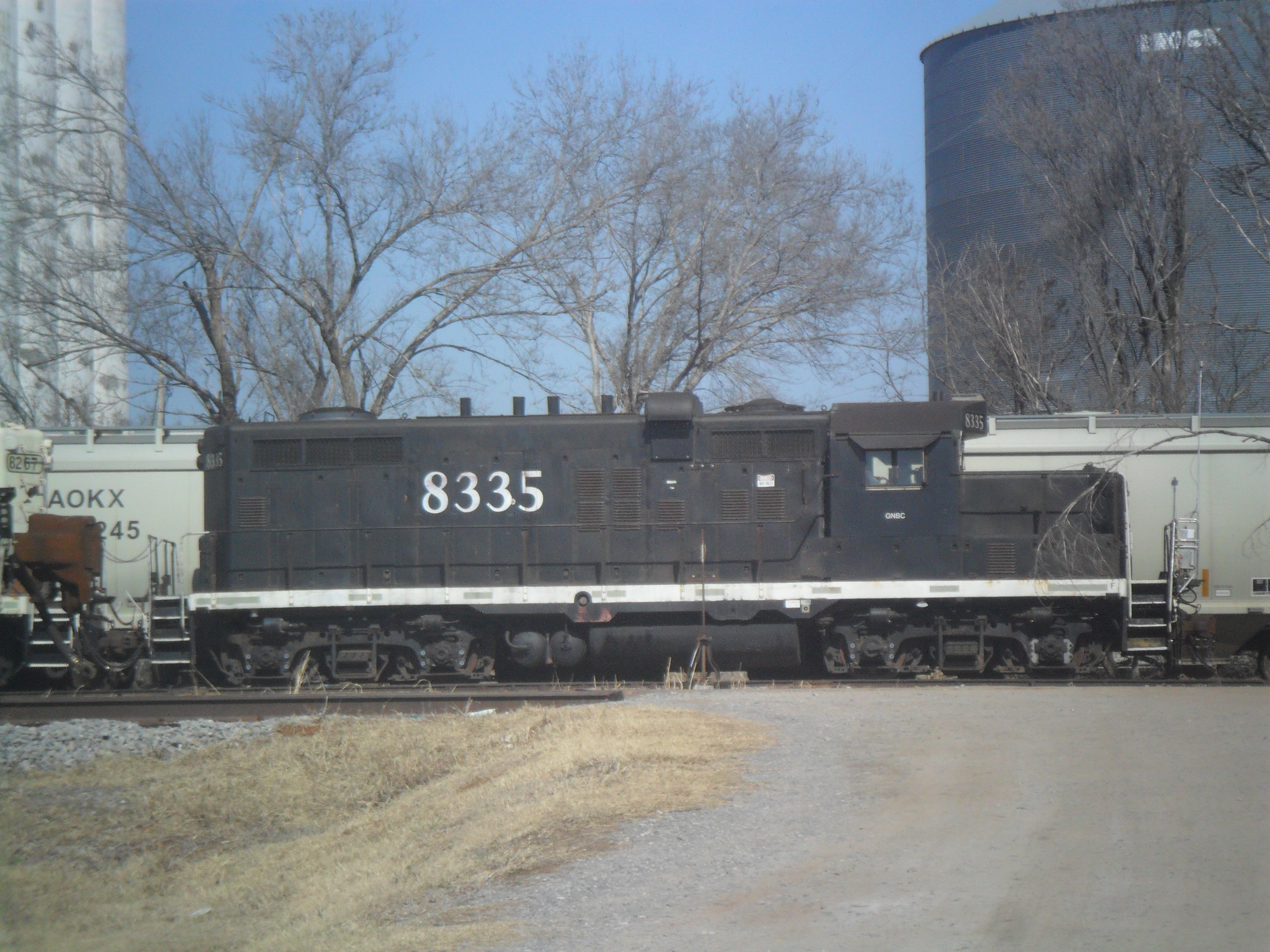
Still in Illinois Central colors, GNBC 8335 sits idle in Weatherford, Oklahoma. Built for the Illinois Central Railroad in 1953.

Grainbelt Corporation (reporting mark GNBC), 176 miles (283 km) of lines from Enid, Oklahoma, to Frederick, Oklahoma, and over 59 miles (95 km) of BNSF Railway trackage rights from Snyder, Oklahoma, to Quanah, Texas.

In addition, FMRC operates Finger Lakes Railway Corporation (reporting mark FGLK) as part of a joint venture; FGLK operates 168 miles of railway in New York state.

FMRC and Grainbelt traffic includes wheat, steel products, fertilizer, rail cars undergoing repair, gypsum rock and associated products, oil field materials, cotton, lumber, feed grains and meals, and farm implements.

The FMRC lines are owned by the state of Oklahoma and were leased to FMRC in 1993. The Grainbelt line began operations as a short-line railroad in 1987.

BNSF named Farmrail System as its “Shortline of the Year” in 2017, citing the company’s entrepreneurial spirit and diligence in attracting new customers, and specifically noting Farmrail’s replacement of 8,400 crossties and more than 10,000 tons of ballast in less than one month to revitalize a siding and capture new business.

== Equipment ==
Model	Road number
EMD SW9	169
EMD GP9	280, 286, 289, 297, 316-317, 331, 1702, 3648, 6083
EMD GP7	617, 620, 1555
EMD GP10	1981, 8251, 8253, 8335
EMD GP38-2	2100, 2105-2108, 2302 & 2304, 2309, 2314
EMD GP38	2675
