= South Haven, Kansas =

City in Sumner County, Kansas

- City
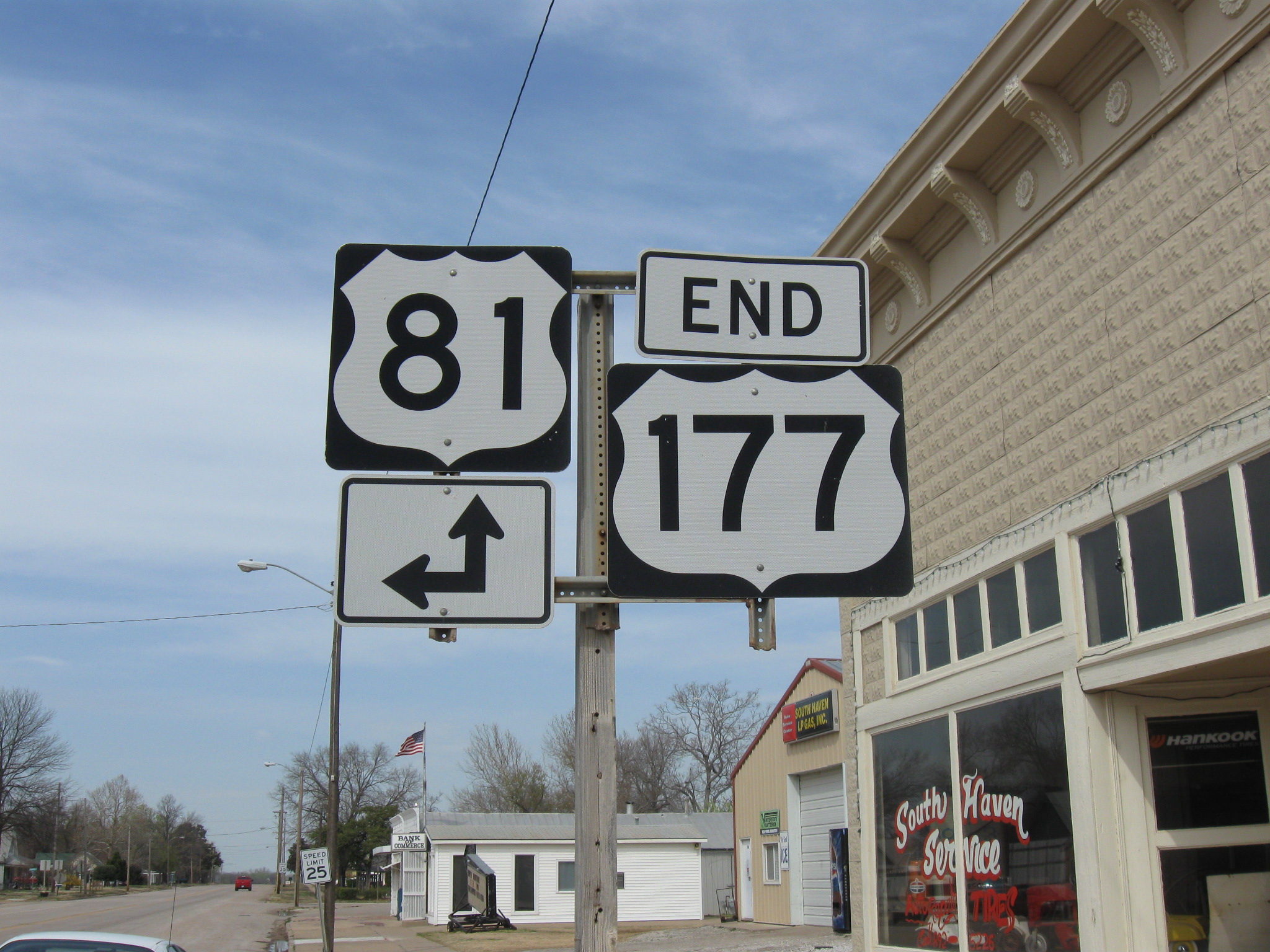
- Road signs in South Haven with businesses in background (2009)

- Location within Sumner County and Kansas

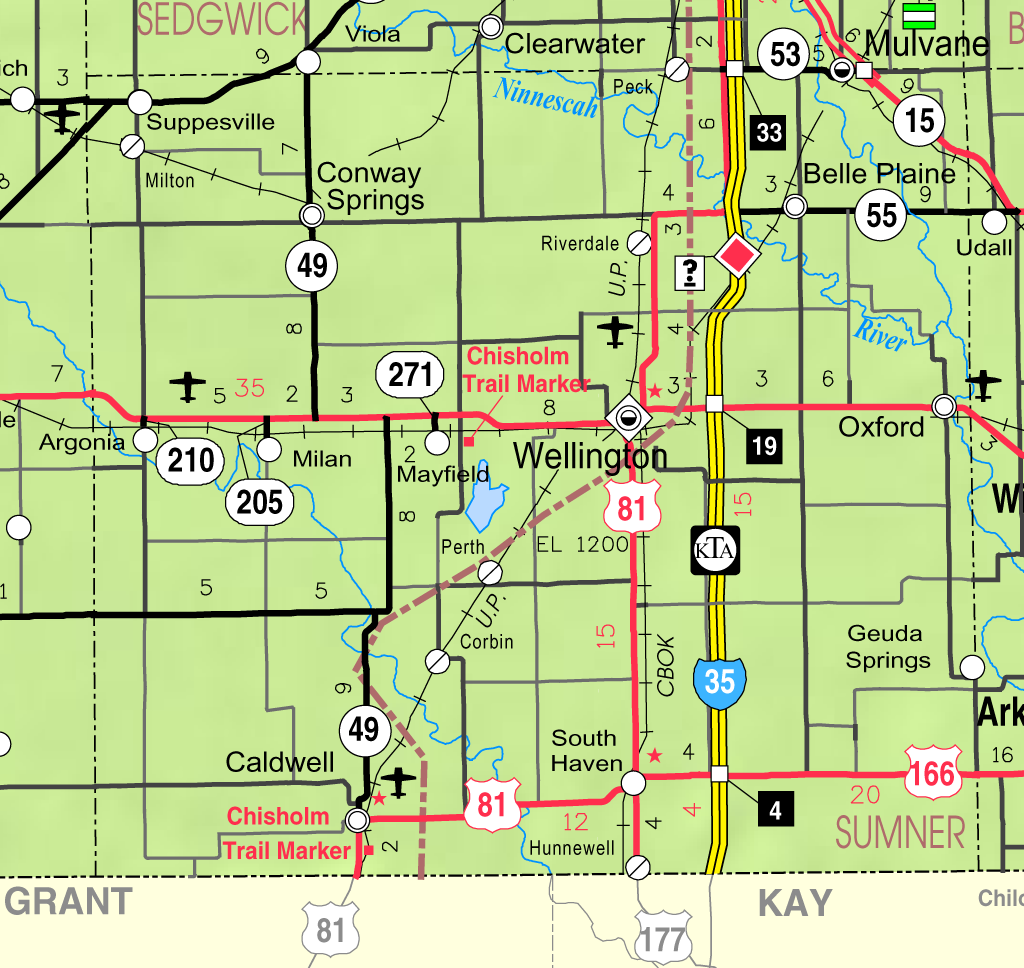
- KDOT map of Sumner County (legend)
- Coordinates: 37°02′58″N 97°24′06″W
- Country: United States
- State: Kansas
- County: Sumner
- Founded: 1872
- Incorporated: 1887
- Named for: South Haven, Michigan

Area
  - Total: 1.00 sq mi (2.59 km^{2})
  - Land: 1.00 sq mi (2.59 km^{2})
  - Water: 0 sq mi (0.00 km^{2})
- Elevation: 1,125 ft (343 m)

Population (2020)
  - Total: 324
  - Density: 324/sq mi (125/km^{2})
- Time zone: UTC-6 (CST)
  - Summer (DST): UTC-5 (CDT)
- ZIP Code: 67140
- Area code: 620
- FIPS code: 20-66650
- GNIS ID: 2395916
- Website: cityofsouthhaven.com

South Haven is a city in Sumner County, Kansas, United States. As of the 2020 census, the population of the city was 324.

== History ==
South Haven was founded in 1872, and was named after South Haven, Michigan. The railroad reached South Haven in 1879.

Unlike other paired towns in Kansas that are located adjacent to one another (e.g. Newton and North Newton or Hutchinson and South Hutchinson), South Haven is about 80 miles from Haven.

== Geography ==
According to the United States Census Bureau, the city has a total area of 0.79 square miles (2.05 km^{2}), all land.

Both the western terminus of U.S. Route 166 and the northern terminus of U.S. Route 177 are in South Haven. In addition, U.S. Route 81 passes through the city.

== Demographics ==
Historical population
Census	Pop.	Note	%±
1880	124		—
1890	465		275.0%
1900	411		−11.6%
1910	483		17.5%
1920	423		−12.4%
1930	442		4.5%
1940	405		−8.4%
1950	358		−11.6%
1960	408		14.0%
1970	413		1.2%
1980	439		6.3%
1990	420		−4.3%
2000	390		−7.1%
2010	363		−6.9%
2020	324		−10.7%
U.S. Decennial Census

=== 2010 census ===
As of the census of 2010, there were 363 people, 142 households, and 97 families living in the city. The population density was 459.5 inhabitants per square mile (177.4/km^{2}). There were 172 housing units at an average density of 217.7 per square mile (84.1/km^{2}). The racial makeup of the city was 94.2% White, 0.3% African American, 1.7% Native American, 0.3% Asian, 1.9% from other races, and 1.7% from two or more races. Hispanic or Latino of any race were 7.4% of the population.

There were 142 households, of which 37.3% had children under the age of 18 living with them, 52.1% were married couples living together, 9.9% had a female householder with no husband present, 6.3% had a male householder with no wife present, and 31.7% were non-families. 29.6% of all households were made up of individuals, and 12.7% had someone living alone who was 65 years of age or older. The average household size was 2.56 and the average family size was 3.20.

The median age in the city was 37.3 years. 30.3% of residents were under the age of 18; 6% were between the ages of 18 and 24; 26.2% were from 25 to 44; 24.6% were from 45 to 64; and 12.9% were 65 years of age or older. The gender makeup of the city was 50.4% male and 49.6% female.

=== 2000 census ===
As of the census of 2000, there were 390 people, 163 households, and 99 families living in the city. The population density was 477.4 inhabitants per square mile (184.3/km^{2}). There were 182 housing units at an average density of 222.8 per square mile (86.0/km^{2}). The racial makeup of the city was 94.10% White, 1.79% Native American, 1.79% from other races, and 2.31% from two or more races. Hispanic or Latino of any race were 3.33% of the population.

There were 163 households, out of which 30.1% had children under the age of 18 living with them, 51.5% were married couples living together, 7.4% had a female householder with no husband present, and 38.7% were non-families. 36.8% of all households were made up of individuals, and 15.3% had someone living alone who was 65 years of age or older. The average household size was 2.39 and the average family size was 3.19.

In the city, the population was spread out, with 29.5% under the age of 18, 5.1% from 18 to 24, 26.2% from 25 to 44, 22.6% from 45 to 64, and 16.7% who were 65 years of age or older. The median age was 37 years. For every 100 females, there were 97.0 males. For every 100 females age 18 and over, there were 91.0 males.

The median income for a household in the city was $31,932, and the median income for a family was $37,917. Males had a median income of $26,111 versus $24,375 for females. The per capita income for the city was $14,019. About 8.3% of families and 9.9% of the population were below the poverty line, including 15.6% of those under age 18 and 14.5% of those age 65 or over.

== Education ==
The community is served by South Haven USD 509 public school district.

== Notable people ==
- Forest Geyer — American football player; elected to the College Football Hall of Fame in 1973
- Donald Owens — American General Superintendent Emeritus in the Church of the Nazarene.
